= 2023 in science =

The following scientific events occurred in 2023.

== Events ==
=== April ===
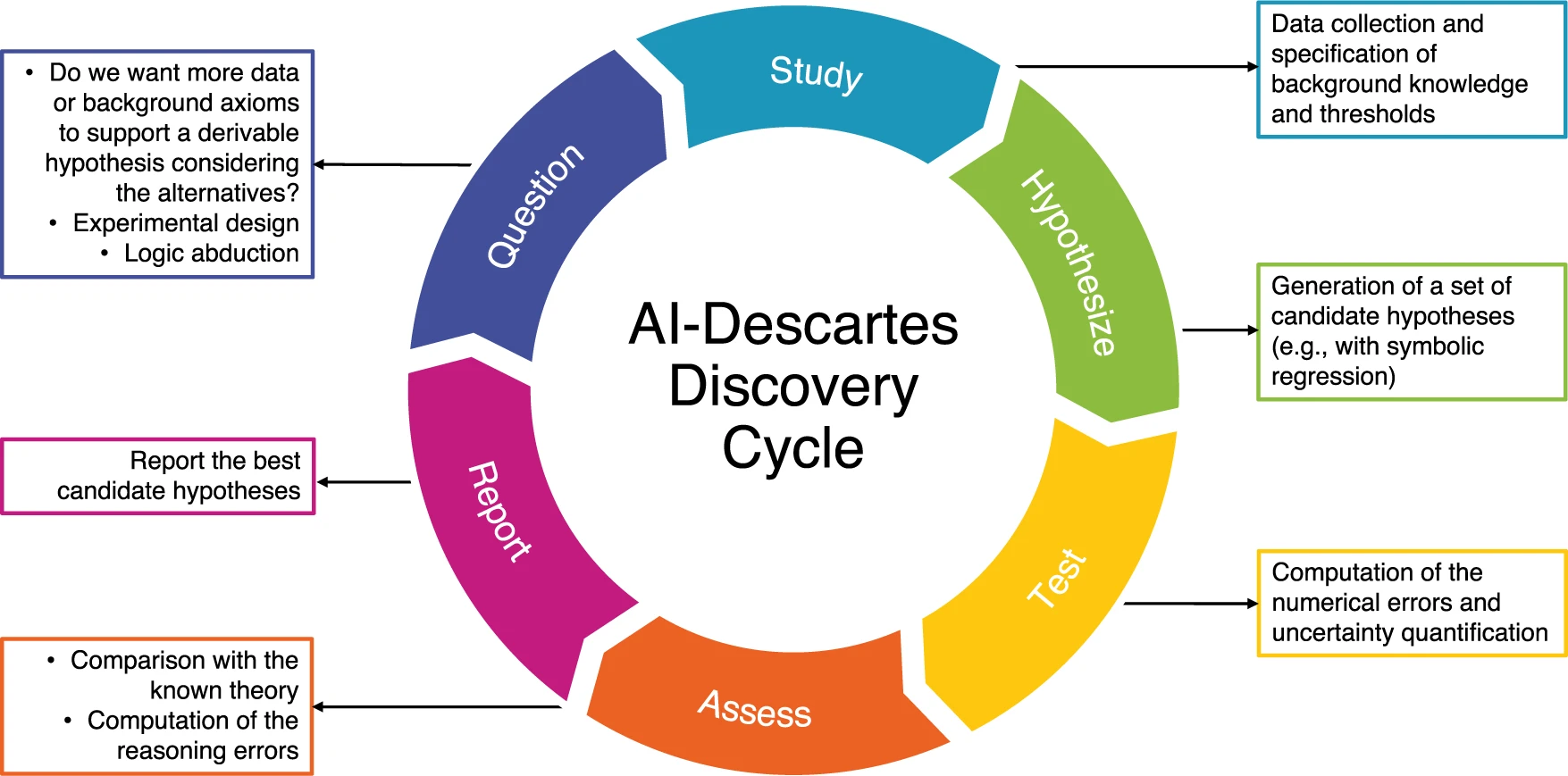
12 April: Researchers demonstrate an 'AI scientist' that can rediscover physical laws from axioms and data.

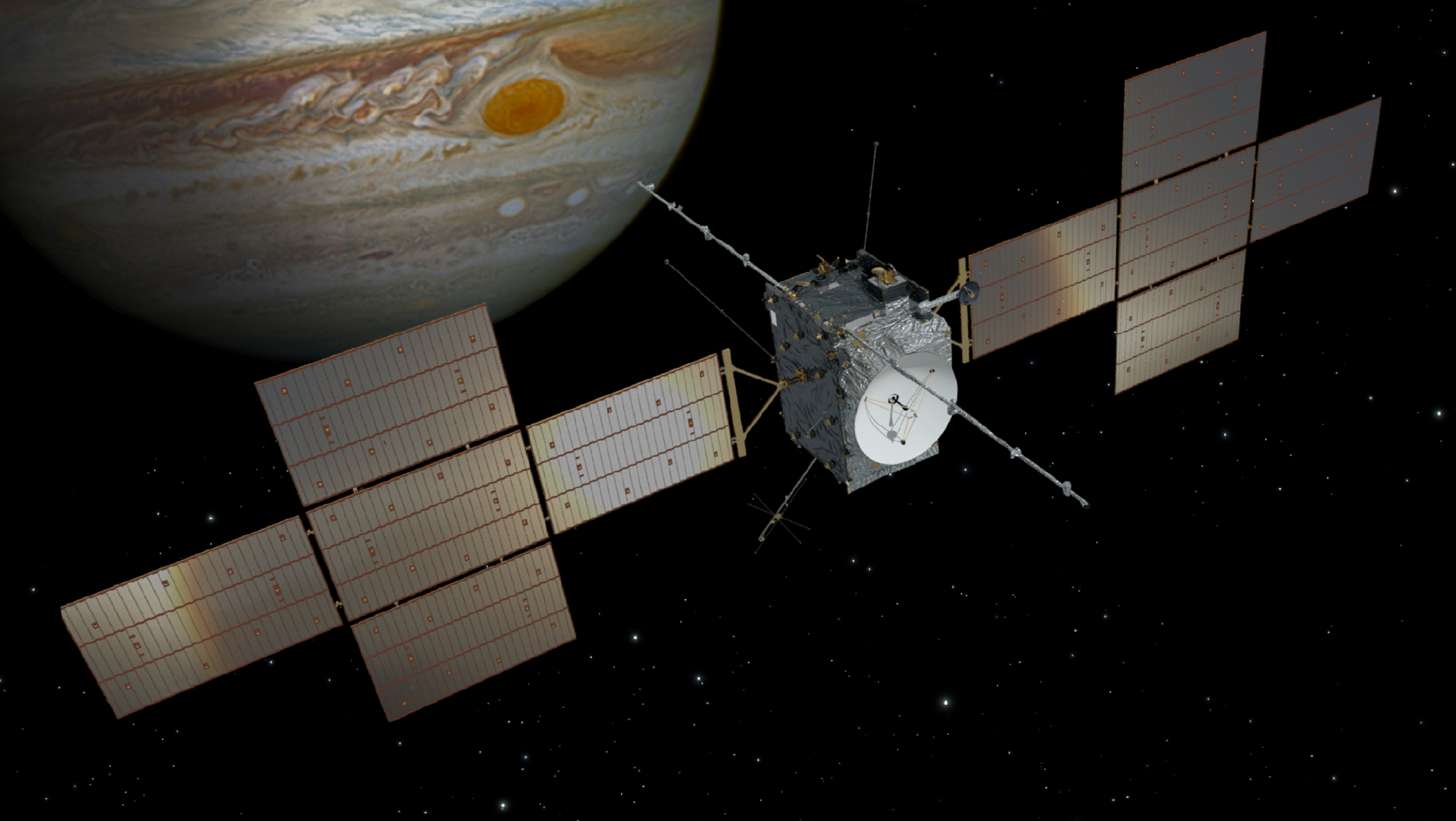
14 April: Launch of the JUICE mission to Jupiter.

- 3 April
  - Five employees at the National Hurricane Center publish a tropical cyclone report (TCR) on Hurricane Ian, which officially upgrades the hurricane from a Category 4 to a Category 5 on the Saffir–Simpson scale. The TCR also stated that Hurricane Ian caused, with 90% confidence, $112.9 billion worth of damage to the United States, which made Ian the third-costliest United States hurricane on record as well as the costliest hurricane to strike Florida on record.
  - An unexplained rise of emissions of five chlorofluorocarbons (CFCs), successfully banned by the Montreal Protocol of 1989, is reported. Their climate impact in 2020 is roughly equivalent to that of the CO_{2}e from Denmark in 2018.
  - A study affirms and explains why a moderate decrease in body temperature extends lifespan.
- 5 April
  - The NOAA reports that greenhouse gases continued to increase rapidly in 2022 and that CO_{2} levels in the atmosphere are now the highest in 4.3 million years.
  - An umbrella review summarizes scientific results on the extensive health effects of added-sugar foods and makes recommendations such as limiting sugar-sweetened beverages which are "the largest source of added sugars" and developing of policy such as advertising restrictions.
- 6 April – A study shows neurons take up glucose (from food) and metabolize it by glycolysis. There was only limited research on how neurons get their energy in the context of links between glucose metabolism and cognition (brain health and performance).
- 10 April – A study expands upon the role of elites' unsustainable consumption in urban water crises. In Cape Town, for example, the wealthiest 14% of the population use half of the city's water, while the poorest 62% use just a quarter.
- 11 April – A study reports that genomic surveillance (GS) shows that a clonal lineage of the wheat blast fungus has spread worldwide and that there is a need for GS to track and mitigate the potential pandemic threat to the global food supply as it may become fungicide-insensitive.
- 13 April
  - The direct imaging of HIP 99770 b, a new exoplanet found 133 light years away, is reported by astronomers.
  - A global trend towards more rapid-onset "flash droughts" hindering forecasting is reported.
- 14 April
  - Jupiter Icy Moons Explorer (JUICE) is launched by the European Space Agency (ESA) to search for life in the Jovian system, with an expected arrival date of 2031.
- 17 April
  - A new technique for improving the resolution of post-mortem MRI brain scans "by 64 million times" is reported by researchers, who capture the sharpest ever images of an entire mouse brain.
  - A study expands upon the international Earth heat inventory from 2020, which provides a measure of the Earth energy imbalance (EEI) and allows for quantifying how much and where heat has accumulated in the Earth system with comprehensive data. It suggests that the EEI is the "most fundamental global climate indicator" to gauge climate change mitigation efforts.
- 18 April
  - Astronomers conclude that "... planets in the habitable zones of stars with low metallicity are the best targets to search for complex life on land."
  - A university reports a study (29 Mar) affirming the high level of economic losses from biological invasions, showing they have risen to the level of economic damage costs from floods or earthquakes, which are also rising.
- 19 April
  - A bolide is observed over Ukraine and Belarus for about five seconds. It is first observed at an altitude of 98 km above Velyka Dymerka, then passes directly above Kyiv at an altitude of 80 km and continues to the southwest with a speed of 29 km/s. A bright flare occurs at an altitude of 38 km, when the bolide's absolute magnitude reaches approximately −18.
  - The likely cause of grey hair is shown to be pigment-making cells losing their ability to mature into melanocytes.
  - Researchers show parrots can and enjoy to use a videocalling system.
  - A study with mice shows that microplastics pass the blood–brain barrier (BBB), entering and accumulating in the brain, and identifies a key determinant for whether or not they pass the BBB.
- 20 April
  - A new 29-year record of ice sheet mass in Greenland and Antarctica is published as part of the IMBIE collaboration. It finds that the combined ice loss in these regions has more than tripled since the early 1990s, with 2019 seeing the greatest losses of any year on record. These findings have implications for future sea level rise.
  - Paleoneurologists publish the first neuroevolutionary timeline about correlations of changes in the shape of the cerebral cortex and functions, showing "variability in surface geometry relates to species' ecology and behaviour" and cognition. It characterizes many of the neuromorphological events in the origin of distinct human intelligence over the past 77 million years.
  - A UNICEF report indicates "public perception of the importance of vaccines for children declined during the COVID-19 pandemic in 52 out of 55 countries studied" with causal factors including "growing access to misleading information". On 26 April, news outlets report that Twitter is warned by EU digital policy-makers after a report indicated its recent policies "boost" Russian disinformation-based propaganda. On 17 April, Twitter introduces labels for rationales when tweets are made less visible which previously were semi-censored without any explanation. On 5 April, the first review of interventions against false conspiracy beliefs, with interventions "that fostered an analytical mindset or taught critical thinking skills" being most effective and preventive action being important.
- 21 April – Researchers report the development of neuromorphic AI hardware using nanowires physically mimicking the brain's activity in identifying and remembering an image from memory. On 26 April, a university reports on a demonstration (11 Mar) of multisensory motion cue integration by a neuromorphic nerve for robots.

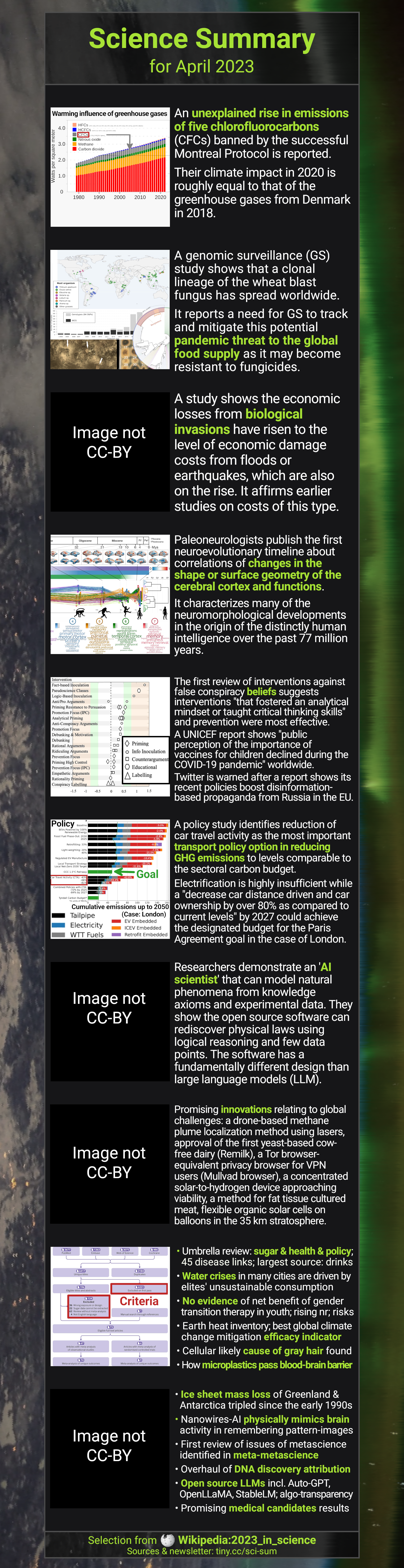
Image version of this section

- 24 April
  - Astronomers release close-up global images, for the first time, of the Martian moon Deimos that were taken by the Mars Hope orbiter.
  - The first review of issues identified in meta-science of metascience is published, providing an overview of ten "questionable" practices (QMPs) in the field such as "overplaying the role of replication in science" and preregistration potential.
  - A policy study identifies reduction of car travel activity as the most important transportation policy option in reducing GHG emissions to levels comparable to carbon budget levels, with a "decrease car distance driven and car ownership by over 80% as compared to current levels" by 2027 being effective in "edging close to the designated carbon budget" in their case-study of London and electrification being highly insufficient. On 20 April, an international study indicates that the contemporary domestic policy-proposal of a general speed limit on highways in Germany, the only large country in the world without such, for a quick GHG emissions reduction would also be economically beneficial. It points to a climate change mitigation law (KSG) that mandated emission reductions in this sector that was changed in 2023 so as to remove these obligations.
- 25 April
  - Scientists, based on new evidence, conclude that Rosalind Franklin was a contributor and "equal player" in the discovery process of DNA, rather than otherwise, as may have been presented subsequently after the time of the discovery.
  - The first gene silencing approach to Alzheimer's disease is reported, with a drug called BIIB080 used on the microtubule-associated protein tau (MAPT) gene. Patients in a Phase 1 trial were found to have a greater than 50% reduction in levels of harmful tau protein after taking the drug.
- 26 April
  - Astronomers present an image, for the first time viewed together, of the shadow of the black hole in the center of the Messier 87 galaxy, and its related high-energy jet.
  - The first global assessment of glacier mass loss from satellite radar altimetry is published. It shows that glaciers lost 2,720 gigatonnes of ice, about 2% of their volume, between 2010 and 2020.
- 28 April – Progress in AI software:
  - ChatGPT is shown to outperform human doctors in responding to online medical questions when measured on quality and empathy by "a team of licensed health care professionals", albeit the chatbot may have previously been trained with these reddit question and answers threads.
  - Further LLM developments during what has been called an "AI boom" include: local or open source versions of LLaMA which was leaked in March, news outlets report on GPT4-based Auto-GPT that given natural language commands uses the Internet and other tools in attempts to understand and achieve its tasks with unclear or so-far little practicality, a systematic evaluation of answers from four "generative search engines" suggests their outputs "appear informative, but frequently contain unsupported statements and inaccurate citations", a multi-modal open source tool for understanding and generating speech, a data scientist argues that "researchers need to collaborate to develop open-source LLMs that are transparent" and independent, Stability AI launches an open source LLM.
  - On 12 April, researchers demonstrate an 'AI scientist' that can create of models of natural phenomena from knowledge axioms and experimental data, showing the software can rediscover physical laws using logical reasoning and few data points.
- Promising results of therapeutic candidates are reported: a review suggests daily vitamin D_{3} may reduce cancer mortality by around 12% (31 Mar), review of experimental phototherapies against dementia cognitive decline (5 Apr), mice-tested L. reuteri-and-tryptophan-diet for checkpoint inhibitor potentiation (6 Apr), doxycycline post-exposure prophylaxis against STIs (6 Apr), an engineered probiotic against alcohol-induced damage (11 Apr), phase 2 trialed AXA1125 against long COVID fatigue (14 Apr), review finds cranberry products useful against UTIs in women (17 Apr) (but is not suggested for older people, those have trouble emptying their bladder, or people who are pregnant), and macaques-tested low-intensity focus ultrasound delivery of AAV into brain regions against brain diseases (19 Apr). Progress in screening: an α-synuclein SAA (assay) against Parkinson's disease (12 Apr), and exogenously administered bioengineered sensors that amplify urinary cancer biomarkers for detection (24 Apr).
- Promising innovations relating to global challenges are reported: a laser-using drone-based methane plume localization method, approval of the first yeast-based cow-free dairy (Remilk), a Tor browser-equivalent Web browser for privacy-protected browsing when using a VPN (Mullvad browser), a concentrated solar-to-hydrogen device approaching viability, a method for fat tissue cultured meat, flexible organic solar cells on balloons in the 35 km stratosphere.

=== May ===
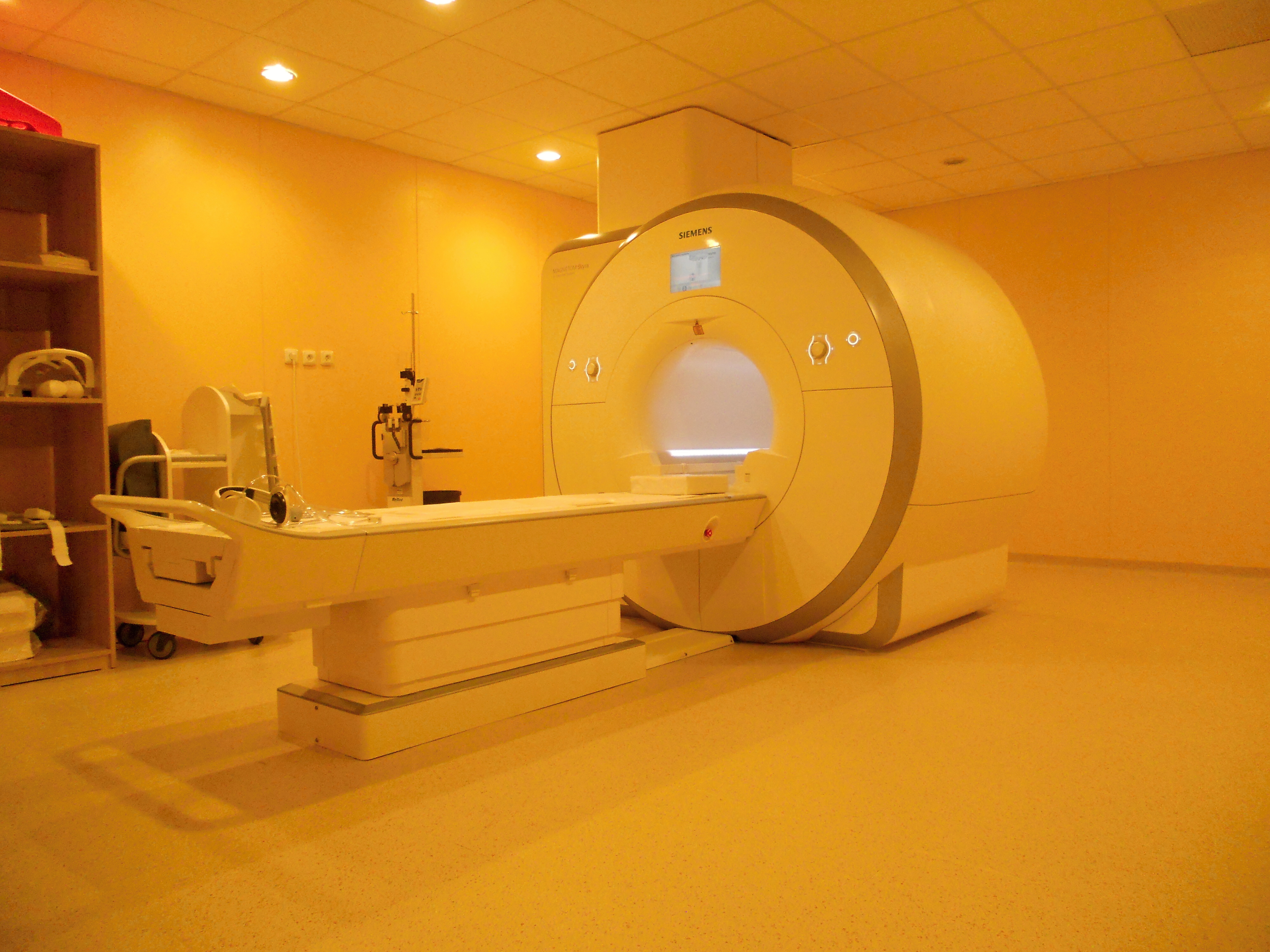
1 May: A new non-invasive brain-reading method for "semantic decoding" based on fMRI is demonstrated.

- 1 May
  - A new brain-reading method for "semantic decoding" is demonstrated. The non-invasive system, based on 16 hours of fMRI data per participant and a transformer, is able to translate a person's neural activity into a continuous stream of text.
  - News outlets report the first study (6 Feb) modelling contemporary detectability of human civilization from afar which suggests overall radio-leakage from mobile towers would still be too weak to be detectable with humanity's next-generation radio telescopes from three of Earth's current closest nearby star-systems. Radar systems are not yet included in their model, while radar emissions during – and possibly since – the Cold War are thought to be the first most detectable cue by which hypothetical extraterrestrials could detect humanity.
  - The second study, after one from early 2022 with similar results, about EEG data of dying humans finds a surge of gamma waves and increased functional connectivities in two of four patients. It provides data and analysis about the brain process of dying (terminal loss of sentience and life) and near-death experiences.
- 2 May
  - A new AI algorithm developed by Baidu is shown to boost the antibody response of COVID-19 mRNA vaccines by 128 times.
  - A single-molecule valve is demonstrated, a breakthrough in nanoscale control of fluids.
  - Scientists report economic factors of neurology or mental health and cognition during child development: association of low income with brain structure and hippocampal volume, stronger associations in U.S. states with higher cost of living, and lower associations for stronger social safety nets for low-income-affected people.

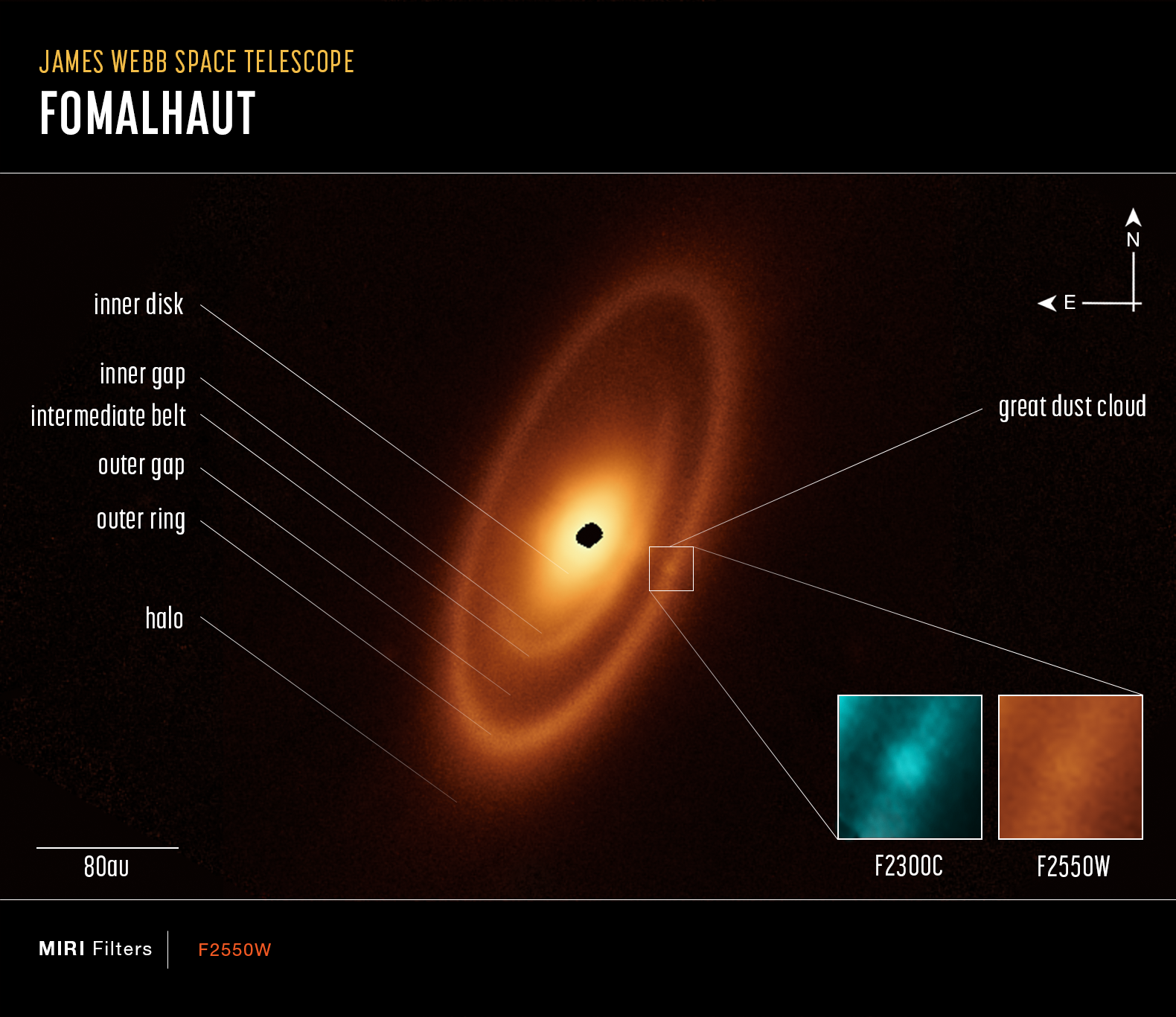
8 May: Infrared view of three asteroid belts around the star Fomalhaut.

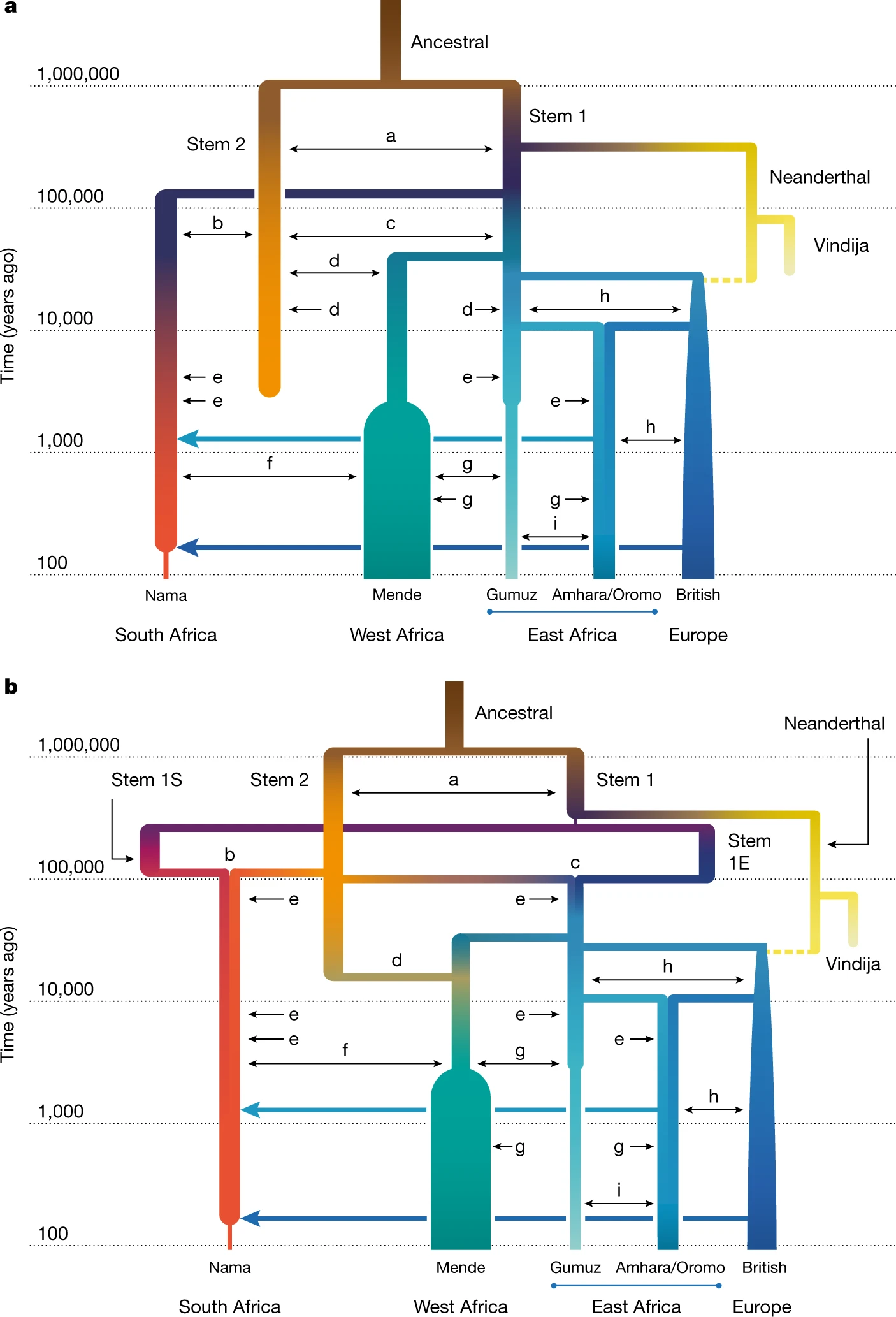
17 May: A more complex model of human evolution.

- 3 May
  - Drug company Eli Lilly reports that donanemab can slow the pace of Alzheimer's disease by 35%, following a Phase 3 study in human patients.
  - Astronomers using the Gemini South telescope report the first direct evidence of an exoplanet being swallowed by an ancient Sun-like star, a fate that likely awaits the Earth in five billion years.
- 4 May – Westinghouse Electric's nuclear division announces the AP300, a miniature version of its signature AP1000 nuclear reactor.
- 5 May – The World Health Organization announces that COVID-19 is no longer considered a global health emergency.
- 8 May
  - The first infrared image of an asteroid belt outside the Solar System is captured by the James Webb Space Telescope. Three distinct rings of debris are shown to exist around Fomalhaut, a young star 25 light years away.
  - AI successfully identifies people at the highest risk for pancreatic cancer up to three years before diagnosis, using solely the patients' medical records.
- 10 May
  - A rough draft of the human "pan-genome" is presented, consisting of 47 genomes from a cohort of genetically diverse individuals. This aims to improve medical research by building on the earlier Human Genome Project.
  - Scientists demonstrate with experimental evolution how macroscopic multicellularity could have emerged on Earth.
- 11 May – The discovery of 62 new moons of Saturn is reported, taking its total confirmed number to 145 and overtaking Jupiter.
- 15 May
  - The National Institutes of Health begins a Phase 1 trial of an mRNA-based universal influenza vaccine, enrolling 50 volunteers.
  - A study shows most extensively the neuro-molecular mechanics of how a fungal parasite affects behavior of insects.
  - A study found that, of 70,000 monitored species, some 48% are experiencing population declines from human activity, whereas only 3% have increasing populations.
  - By publishing virome-related results, researchers close a major gap in the accumulating research into centenarians' microbiome characteristics for life extension.
- 16 May – A software tool called Allegro is reported to accurately simulate 44 million atoms, running on the Perlmutter supercomputer.
- 17 May
  - Astronomers confirm the existence of MACS1149-JD1 (JD1), one of the farthest known galaxies from Earth.
  - Scientists report, based on genetic studies, a more complicated pathway of human evolution than previously understood. According to the studies, humans evolved from different places and times in Africa, instead of from a single location and period of time.
  - The newly discovered exoplanet LP 791-18 d is theorised to be covered with volcanoes, due to the extreme gravitational pull of a super-Earth in the same system.
  - A study proposes school curricula start including useful basic life support, noting that e.g. complemented video lessons could be effective.
- 18 May
  - Astronomers map the paths of potentially hazardous asteroids for the next 1,000 years. At least 28 asteroids of 1 km diameter or larger are found to have non-zero probabilities of a 'deep encounter' with Earth.
  - A study reports that more than 50% of freshwater lakes and reservoirs lost volume since 1992 due to human and climatic drivers.
- 19 May
  - A policies study review, based on a systematic examination of existing methane policies across sectors, concludes that both only "about 13% of methane emissions are covered by methane mitigation policies" and that the effectiveness of these policies "is far from clear".
  - Researchers propose a methodological approach and quantifications for reparations from fossil fuel producers. Cross-disciplinary researchers propose academics make universities implement, leadingly, the plant-based dietary transition that an increasingly large and confirmed corpus of studies, to which these contributed to, concludes is vital (7 May).
  - Metascience-related events
    - Nature reports China has "overtaken the United States as the number one ranked country or territory for contributions to research articles published in the Nature Index group of high-quality natural-science journals", remaining at second place overall. The Nature Index, since 2016, evaluates contribution by the number of articles published in a subgroup of their journals – other potential or less popular approaches and metrics for quantifications of success or impact can or could produce different rankings or annual tables and conclusions.
    - 34% of neuroscience papers and 23% of medical papers published in 2020 were probably fabricated or plagiarized, according to a preprint study, stemming from paper mills (9 May).
    - A time-use research study (10 May) estimates the costs of manuscript (re)formatting to fit journal guidelines, ~$230 million or ~75 million hours of lost academics' time in 2021. As researchers, usually with little time, usually conduct these tasks themselves and manually and the, largely cosmetic, unstandardized changes are required before, not after, the paper is accepted for publication, the study proposes journals start allowing "free-format submissions".
    - A study (25 May) highlights a list of problematic persuasive methods in academic articles, such as exaggerating the importance of the work or insufficient contextualization by "Not citing previous work that decreases the perceived novelty of the current work".

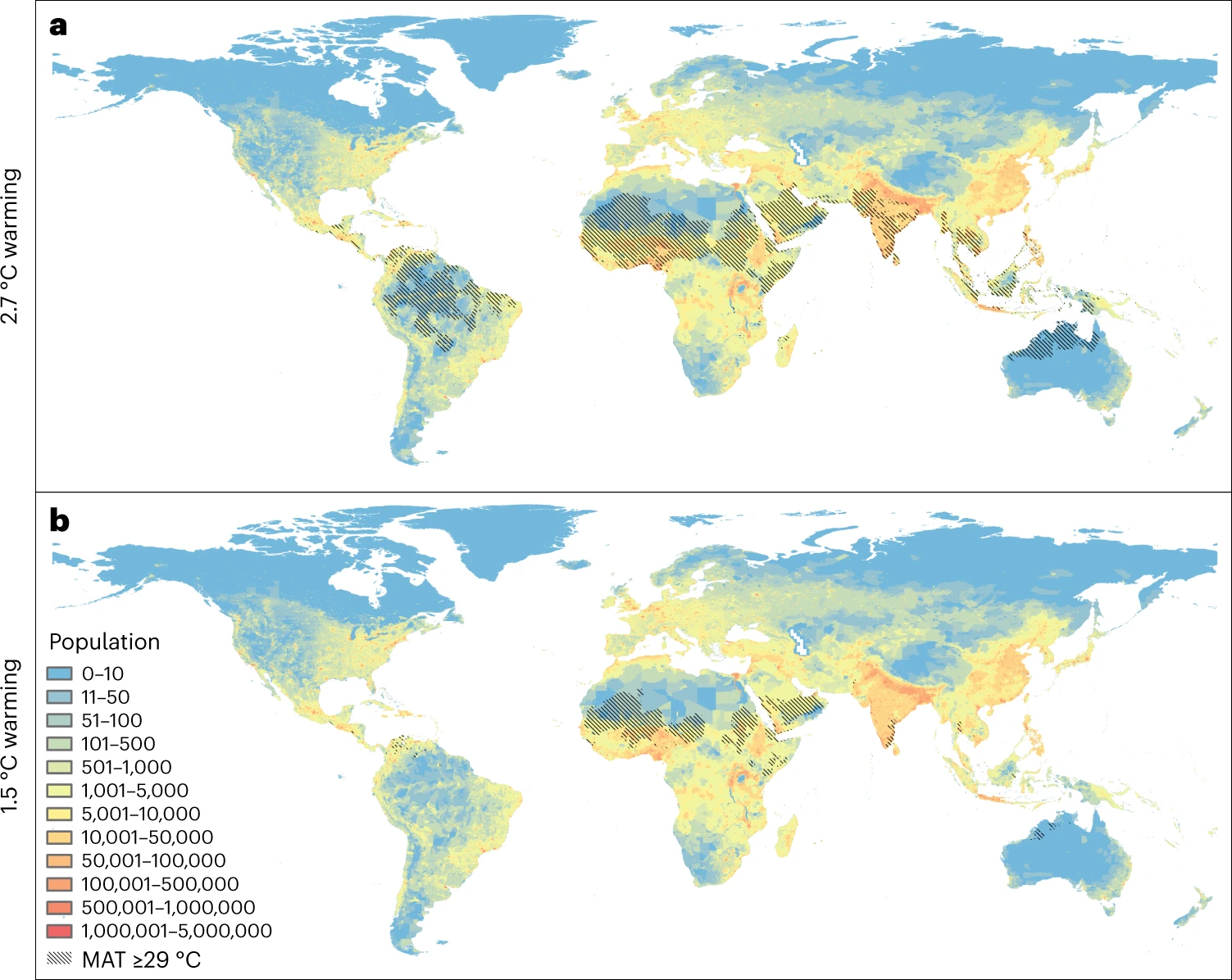
22 May: 2.7 °C global warming could by 2100 leave every third outside the human climate niche (MAT ≥29 °C).

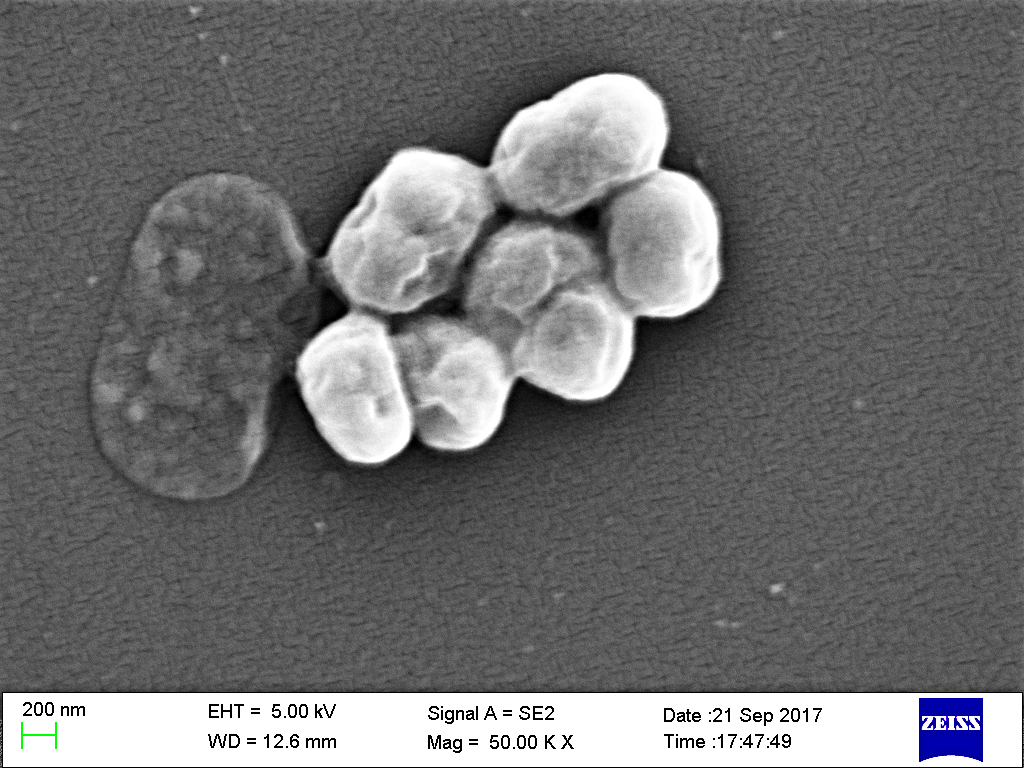
25 May: Artificial intelligence is reported to have designed a new antibiotic, effective against Acinetobacter baumannii (pictured).

- 21 May – IBM announces that it will begin development of a 100,000-qubit quantum computer, the world's largest and most powerful, to be completed by 2033.
- 22 May – A study quantifies "the human cost of global warming", showing current policies "leading to around 2.7 °C global warming could by 2080–2100 leave one-third (22–39%)" of people outside their climate niche – humans' long-time range of mean annual temperatures to which their physiology may have largely adapted to. It indicates meeting the 1.5 °C goal would decrease the population exposed to unprecedented heat ~5-fold and ties itself to earlier research by initially noting that quantifying the social cost of carbon in monetary terms, as related or economics studies tend to do, may be inadequate.
- 23 May
  - Using the Hubble Space Telescope and Gaia spacecraft, an analysis of proper motions of the closest known globular cluster, Messier 4, reveals an excess mass of roughly 800 solar masses in the center. This appears to not be extended, and could thus be the best kinematic evidence for an intermediate-mass black hole (even if an unusually compact cluster of compact objects, white dwarfs, neutron stars or stellar-mass black holes cannot be completely discounted).
  - A study identifies plastic chopping boards as a substantial source of ingested microplastics. Researchers show plastic recycling facilities are a major source of microplastic water pollution (1 May).
  - Computational neuroscientists show that people with higher intelligence scores in HCP cognitive tests took more time to solve difficult problems and that their higher synchrony between brain areas allowed for better integration of evidence (or progress) from preceding working memory sub-problem processing. Reducing synchrony in "avatar" simulations, that were adjusted and tuned towards personalization, "led decision-making circuits to quickly jump to conclusions". Their codified results may be useful for an understanding of cognition to replicate or imitate in bio-inspired computing.
  - Researchers report trends in reasons for HPV vaccine hesitancy during 2010–20.
- 24 May
  - Scientists show how gene 'FAAH'-related disruption via genetic or epigenome editing can enable pain insensitivity. Their analyses, mainly about long non-coding RNA 'FAAH-OUT', following from decade-long study of a woman who can't feel pain or anxiety, could also enable novel therapeutic developments against other neurological problems.
  - One of the first empirical studies on what real users are shown during their typical use of popular Web search engines interprets its results to show that choices for unreliable news sources for their queries are driven primarily by users' own choices and less by the engine's algorithms. The Web scientists link their findings to the concept of filter bubbles which emphasizes the role of design- and personalization algorithms. On 2 May, a report accompanied by an open letter concludes that Alphabet Inc, against its voluntary promises, still runs climate misinformation ads. Statements by Elon Musk in 2022 suggest YouTube may also show ethically disputed advertising other than science-related misinformation such as extensively showing "scam ads".
- 25 May
  - 5,000 marine species new to science are discovered in the Clipperton fracture zone, a proposed deep sea mining hotspot in the Pacific Ocean.
  - Explainable deep learning is used to develop an experimental antibiotic called abaucin, which is shown to be effective against A. baumannii.
  - Evidence for the existence of a second Kuiper Belt is presented by NASA scientists, which the New Horizons spacecraft could potentially visit during the late 2020s or early 2030s.
  - A study reports observational evidence for problematic fast slowdown of the Antarctic bottom water current.
  - Neuroengineers demonstrate induction of a torpor-like state in mice via ultrasound stimulation.
- 29 May
  - A new record high efficiency of 19.3% for organic solar cells is reported.
  - MBR Explorer is announced by the United Arab Emirates Space Agency, an uncrewed mission to explore seven asteroids, which includes an attempted surface landing on 269 Justitia in 2034.
  - Scientists provide details of H5N1 bird flu's fast viral evolution of clade 2.3.4.4b including reassortment after "explosive geographic expansion in 2021 among wild birds", with relevance to measures such as existing candidate vaccines.
- 31 May
  - The first X-ray of a single atom is reported.
  - An international study, using modelling and literature assessment, codifies, integrates into and quantifies "safe and just Earth system boundaries" (ESBs) with the context of Earth system stability and minimization of human harm. They expand upon earlier boundary frameworks by incorporating concepts such as intra- and intergenerational justice, propose that their framework may better enable a quantitative foundation for safeguarding the global commons, and report many of the ESBs are already exceeded.
- Healthcare systems related results are published: large increases in medication prices via sustained decrease in their use can cause poorer disease control (8 May), widespread implementation of the particular Alzheimer's disease therapeutic solution lecanemab may increase annual U.S. Medicare spending by $2.0 to $5.1 billion (11 May), mailed HPV self-collection kits with scheduling assistance can lead to greater uptake of cervical cancer screening (11 May), cost-related medication nonadherence occurs in approximately 1 in 5 older adults in the U.S. in 2022 (18 May), and a QALY-based health economics study evaluates the cost-effectiveness of U.S. population-wide screening for CKD (23 May).
- Research on potential current public risk sources is published: the common DBP and BPAF appear to have "substantial impact on the integrity of the sperm nucleus and DNA structure" in mice via oxidative stress (5 May), a preliminary study contextualizes "time spent on social media" as one of the "least influential factors in adolescent mental health" (8 May), ubiquitous environmental contaminant TCE appears to be a risk factor for Parkinson's disease (PD) (15 May), various pesticides are identified as potential risk factors for PD (16 May), researchers demonstrate a two zero-day vulnerabilities-based quick low-cost method – "BrutePrint" – for bypassing common smartphones' fingerprint authentication (18 May), and common sucralose impurity sucralose-6-acetate appears to be DNA damaging with sucralose-sweetened drinks potentially far exceeding the threshold of toxicological concern (29 May).
- Promising innovations relating to global challenges are demonstrated: an open source automated experimentation science platform (BacterAI) for predicting microbial metabolism with little data (4 May), a pesticide alternative against wheat seed loss (22 May), a low-cost smartphone-attachment (BPClip) for blood pressure measurement (29 May), an open source transfer learning-based system (Geneformer) for predicting how networks of interconnected human genes control or affect the function of cells (31 May).
- Promising results of therapeutic candidates are reported: phase I trialed ultrasound BBB-opening device against brain cancer (1 May), phase I trialed personalized mRNA vaccine against pancreatic cancer recurrence (10 May), a novel antibiotic (Streptothricin F) against ABR bacteria (9 May), an e-skin for prosthetic sensing (18 May), two-dose JYNNEOS vaccine against mpox appears ~86% (19 May) or ~66% (18 May) effective, and a xenografted mice-tested pan-KRAS-inhibitor against cancer (31 May).

=== June ===
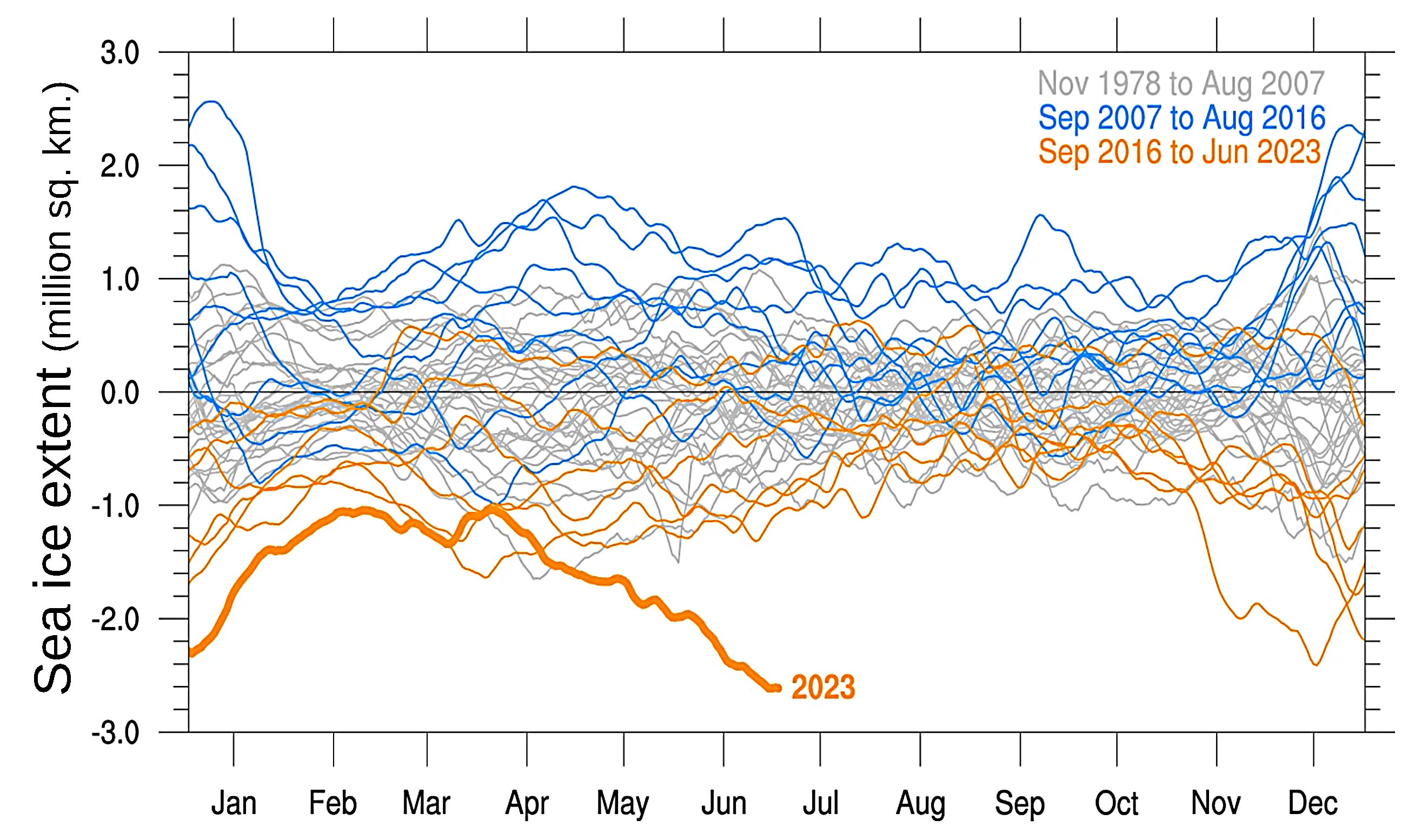
Reporting low Antarctic sea ice extent in mid 2023, researchers concluded that a "regime shift" may be taking place "in which previously important relationships no longer dominate sea ice variability".

- 1 June – Caltech reports the first successful beaming of solar energy from space down to a receiver on the ground, via the MAPLE instrument on its SSPD-1 spacecraft, launched into orbit in January.
- 2 June – Physicist Lucas Lombriser proposes a controversial alternative way of interpreting the available scientific data which suggests that the notion of an expanding universe may be more a "mirage" than otherwise.
- 5 June
  - Scientists report potential evidence that Homo naledi, an extinct species of small-brained archaic human discovered in 2013 in South Africa, and living as long as 500,000 years ago, buried their dead, created art in their caves and used fire.
  - A 'chef' robot developed is trained to watch and learn from cooking videos, and recreate dishes itself.
  - A first global estimate suggests that an equivalent of ~36% of current annual CO_{2} emissions from fossil fuels is stored by soil mycelium of mycorrhizal fungi yearly.
- 6 June – A study finds that the first complete disappearance of Arctic sea ice could occur during the 2030s, a decade earlier than previously forecast.
- 7 June – Scientists report a new mechanism of central nervous system viral diseases including COVID-19 – fusion of brain cells.
- 8 June
  - US scientists confirm that the next El Niño has begun, likely resulting in higher global temperatures in late 2023 and into 2024. Various statistics show the year is unusual and climate change is already having significant impacts such as an Antarctic sea ice extent anomaly and record-high ocean surface temperatures.
  - Taurine given to a range of animal species is found to boost health and extend lifespan by up to 12%.
- 12 June – A time-use study provides the first comprehensive bird's-eye view of what humans currently spend their time on. The "global human day" framework enables better understanding, across fields of research, of the global human system in contexts such as technological change, civilization sustainability, global challenges or goals, societal changes, and economic time allocation. It identifies some factors of variations and activities "for which there is significant potential for change".
- 14 June
  - Teams of researchers report creations of synthetic human model embryos from stem cells, without the need for sperm or egg cells, challenging legal, ethical, and biological concepts.
  - Scientists report evidence that the planet Earth may have formed in just three million years, much faster than the 100 million years thought earlier.
  - Astronomers report that the presence of phosphates on Enceladus, a moon of the planet Saturn, has been detected, completing the discovery of all the basic chemical ingredients for life on the moon.
  - IBM computer scientists report that a quantum computer produced better results for a physics problem than a conventional supercomputer.
  - A machine learning model is trained to recognise the key features of chemicals with senolytic activity. It finds three chemicals – ginkgetin, periplocin and oleandrin – able to remove senescent cells without damaging healthy cells.
- 16 June – Researchers report an fMRI study (31 May) that identifies circuitries and changes which may be crucial for consciousness in humans – or the loss and the recovery thereof in disorders of consciousness e.g. in coma patients.
- 17 June – Researchers report that a single gas-stove burner can raise the indoor concentrations of benzene, related to cancer risk, to more than that found in secondhand tobacco smoke.
- 19 June – Researchers review research on the substantial links between social isolation (HR ~1.32) and loneliness (HR ~1.14) and mortality.
- 21 June – The first successful transplant of a functional cryopreserved mammalian kidney is reported. The study demonstrates a "nanowarming" technique for vitrification for up-to-100 days preservation of transplant organs.
- 22 June – A study projects that by 2050, the worldwide number of adults with diabetes will more than double, from 529 million to over 1.3 billion. No country is expected to see a decline.
- 26 June
  - Retatrutide, an experimental drug against obesity, is shown to achieve a more than 24% mean weight reduction in human adults during a Phase 2 trial.
  - Astronomers detect, for the first time, methenium, CH_{3}^{+} (and/or carbon cation, C^{+}), basic ingredients of life as we know it, in interstellar space.
- 28 June
  - Astronomers report the possible detection of a gravitational wave background (GWB) in the Universe.
  - A study with controlling finds substantial links between reading for pleasure during childhood and later cognition.
  - Researchers report in a preprint the CRISPR alternative fanzor naturally present in eukaryotes with several potential advantages over CRISPR in genome editing, notably smaller size and higher selectiveness. A separate team further demonstrates in a preprint (14 June) the potential of this class of genome editors.
- 29 June – Astronomers report using a new technique to detect, for the first time, the release of neutrinos from the galactic plane of the Milky Way galaxy.
- Hazard research is published: study results suggest high-temperature cooking could cause DNA damage within food (especially meat) which in turn could cause human DNA damage (1 June), a study concludes the Italian Phlegraean Fields could be heading towards a first eruption since 1538 (9 June), a small team of researchers evaluates the credibility of net-zero climate targets as currently low (9 June), an AHA review shows that exposure to contaminant metals contributes to cardiovascular diseases (12 June), a study in the context of the opioid epidemic shows males are substantially (2–3 times greater) more vulnerable to or affected by drug overdose mortality than females (15 June), loss of Y chromosome can drive cancer growth (21 June), a study indicates nearly 40% of U.S. females age 12 to 21 may have iron deficiency (27 June), researchers show how bird flu could mutate to overcome a human antiviral protein to start another pandemic (28 June), shortages of medications – including some against cancer – are reported across countries, articles in science outlets like Nature suggest contemporary viral concerns about hypothetical existential risk of AI "plays into the tech companies' agenda" – partly in the form of 'criti-hype' – and that this "hinders effective regulation of the societal harms AI is causing right now" and in the near-future.
- Promising results of therapeutic candidates are reported: first phase 3 trialed chikungunya vaccine (VLA1553) (12 June), mice-tested inoculation against a potential infectious contributor to endometriosis (14 June), new evidence regarding still-unclear vaginal seeding interventions (15 June), phase 2 trialed orforglipron against obesity (23 June), mice-tested gene-therapy against hearing loss (28 June).
- Promising innovations relating to global challenges are demonstrated: an overview of "the nascent industry of AI-designed drugs" (1 June), after moderators of the Web content aggregation-based platform Reddit strike against the site's introduction of API pricing and the ensuing closing of several mobile client apps, several novel decentralized open source aggregation platforms gain substantial numbers of users – most notably Lemmy and Kbin which can synchronize their posts via interoperability (12 June), the first upgrade of the Global Earthquake Model data for disaster risk reduction is reported (13 June), first approval for two cultured meat products in the U.S. and two of the first worldwide (21 June), transgenic soya beans containing pig protein (Piggy Sooy) are reported (28 June), a new type of glass (LionGlass) that is substantially more damage-resistant and more sustainable is reported (30 June).

=== July ===
- 1 July – The ESA space telescope Euclid is launched, beginning a six-year mission to study dark energy and dark matter.
- 3 July – Researchers demonstrate encoding and storing data – small images – as DNA without new DNA synthesis by recording light exposure into bacterial DNA via optogenetic circuits. The 'biological camera' extends chemical and electrical interface techniques.
- 5 July
  - Harvard astronomer Avi Loeb reports the possibility of a Galileo project expedition having found first interstellar material.
  - A first evolution experiment of synthetic 'minimal cells' – JCVI-syn3B bacterial cells whose genomes were trimmed to 493 essential genes and are the smallest of any known free-living organism – shows they survive and mutate vitally with their >50% decrease in fitness to JCVI-syn1 being regained after ~2,000 generations under accelerated evolution.
- 6 July – A study indicates release of methane from Arctic glacial retreat will result in Arctic emissions much higher than expected.

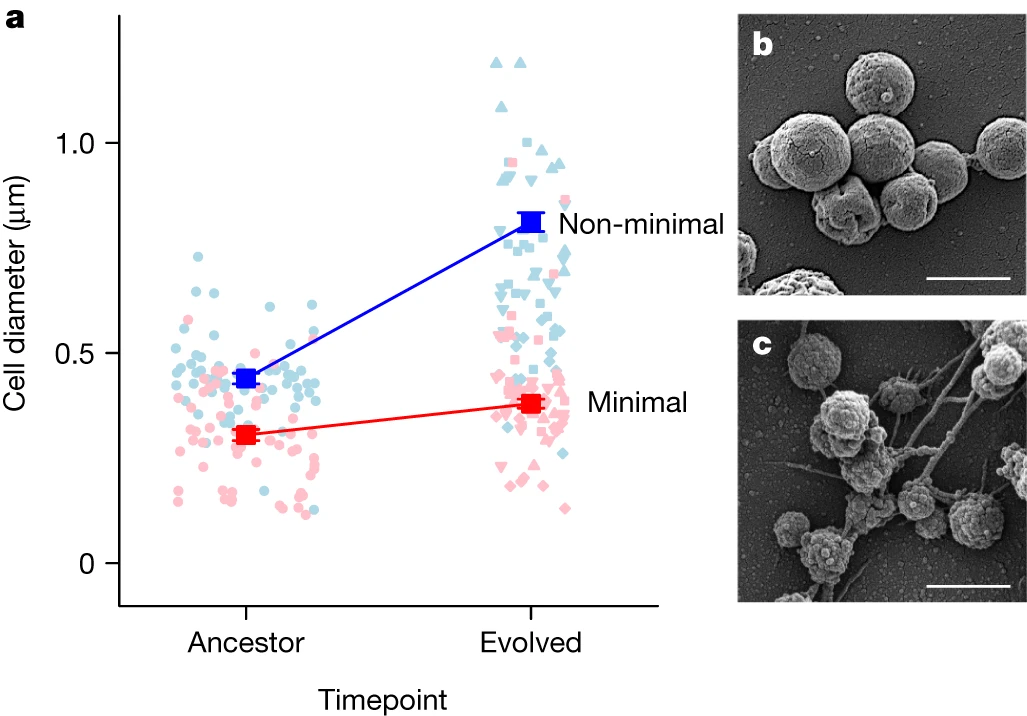
5 July: A first evolution experiment of synthetic bacterial 'minimal cells' JCVI-syn3B shows "life finds a way".

- 10 July
  - Dynamic shell formation is demonstrated experimentally for the first time. Researchers claim their technique is a feasible target for mass production of fusion energy.
  - The highest albedo ever measured for an exoplanet is confirmed using data from the CHEOPS space telescope. The ultra-hot Neptune LTT 9779 b is shown to reflect 80% of incoming light from its star (compared to 75% for Venus), due to the high metal content of its clouds.
- 11 July
  - Three possible "dark star" candidates are reported, at times ranging from about 320 million to 400 million years after the Big Bang, based on analysis of observations by the James Webb Space Telescope
  - Berkeley Earth reports that June 2023 was the warmest June since records began in 1850, and broke the previous record by 0.18 °C. Its temperature dataset suggests that 2023 is now 81% likely to become a new record year for global warming.
  - A study suggests that carbon taxation approaches or instruments would be more effective and fairer when distinguishing between luxury- and basic goods and services. A separate study (17 July) finds that for energy demand reduction (EDR), "capping energy use of the top quintile of consumers" would be effective, more equitable, and increase public acceptance of transformative climate action in Europe.
- 12 July
  - Astronomers report considerable success of the James Webb Space Telescope (JWST) after its first year of operations.
  - In what could be the first global scientific analysis of plastic pollution of lakes and reservoirs that is not limited to recently increasingly studied microplastics, a large team of researchers reports high prevalence and vulnerability factors.
  - In what could be the first global scientific analysis of agricultural pesticide pollution, scientists report that of the studied third of the three million metric tons of pesticides used annually, ~10% remains as toxic residue in soil while rivers receive at least 730 tons where they nearly do not degrade.
  - A study suggests chemical alternatives to age reversal via Yamanaka factors gene therapy are feasible via early in vitro fibroblasts data. On 3 July, researchers report subcutaneous administration of longevity factor α-klotho enhanced cognition in old rhesus macaques. On 27 July, a study shows rejuvenation effects in mice from heterochronic parabiosis endure after the joined mice are detached.

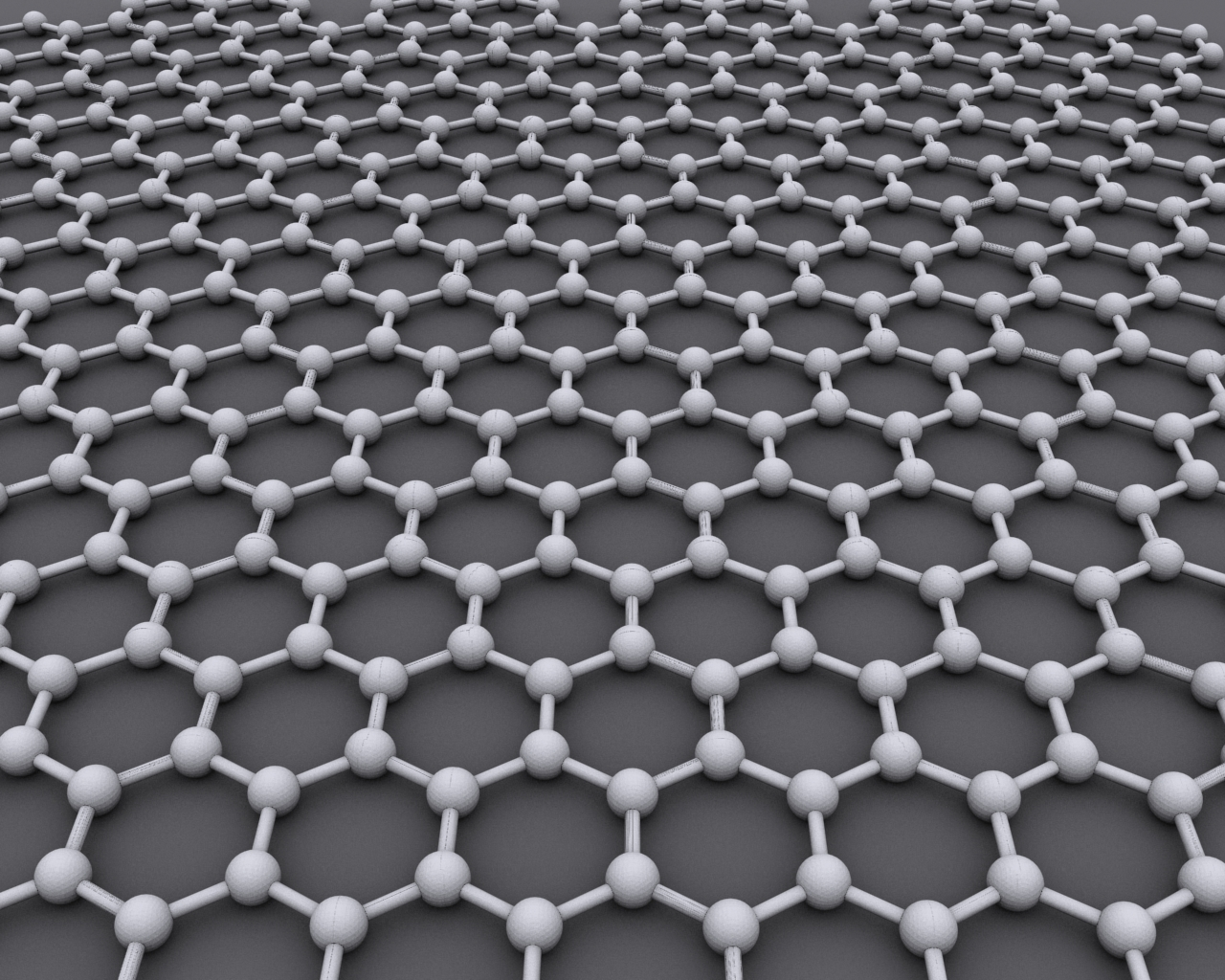
18 July: Naturally occurring graphene is reported for the first time.

- 13 July
  - Air pollution particles are shown to reduce insects' ability to find food and a mate, in experiments. This may be contributing to the dramatic fall in global insect populations, the scientists conclude.
  - Scientists use CRISPR gene-editing to reduce the lignin content in poplar trees by as much as 50%, offering a potentially more sustainable method of fiber production.
- 14 July – The Indian Space Research Organisation (ISRO) successfully launches its Chandrayaan-3 spacecraft towards the Moon, aiming to become the fourth nation to achieve a soft landing on the lunar surface.
- 17 July – Astronomers of the Breakthrough Listen project report the development of a novel technique that can help distinguish between potential deliberate artificial alien signals and Earth-based radio interference via unique signatures from passing through ionized plasma of interstellar medium.
- 19 July – Astronomers report the discovery of a bizarre 'two-faced' star, with one side made up of hydrogen and the other consisting of helium. The object, designated ZTF J203349.8+322901.1, is a white dwarf located about 1,000 light years away.
- 18 July – The first example of naturally occurring graphene is reported, at a gold mine in South Africa.
- 19 July – Researchers report the discovery of self-healing of fatigue cracks in metals in vacuum.

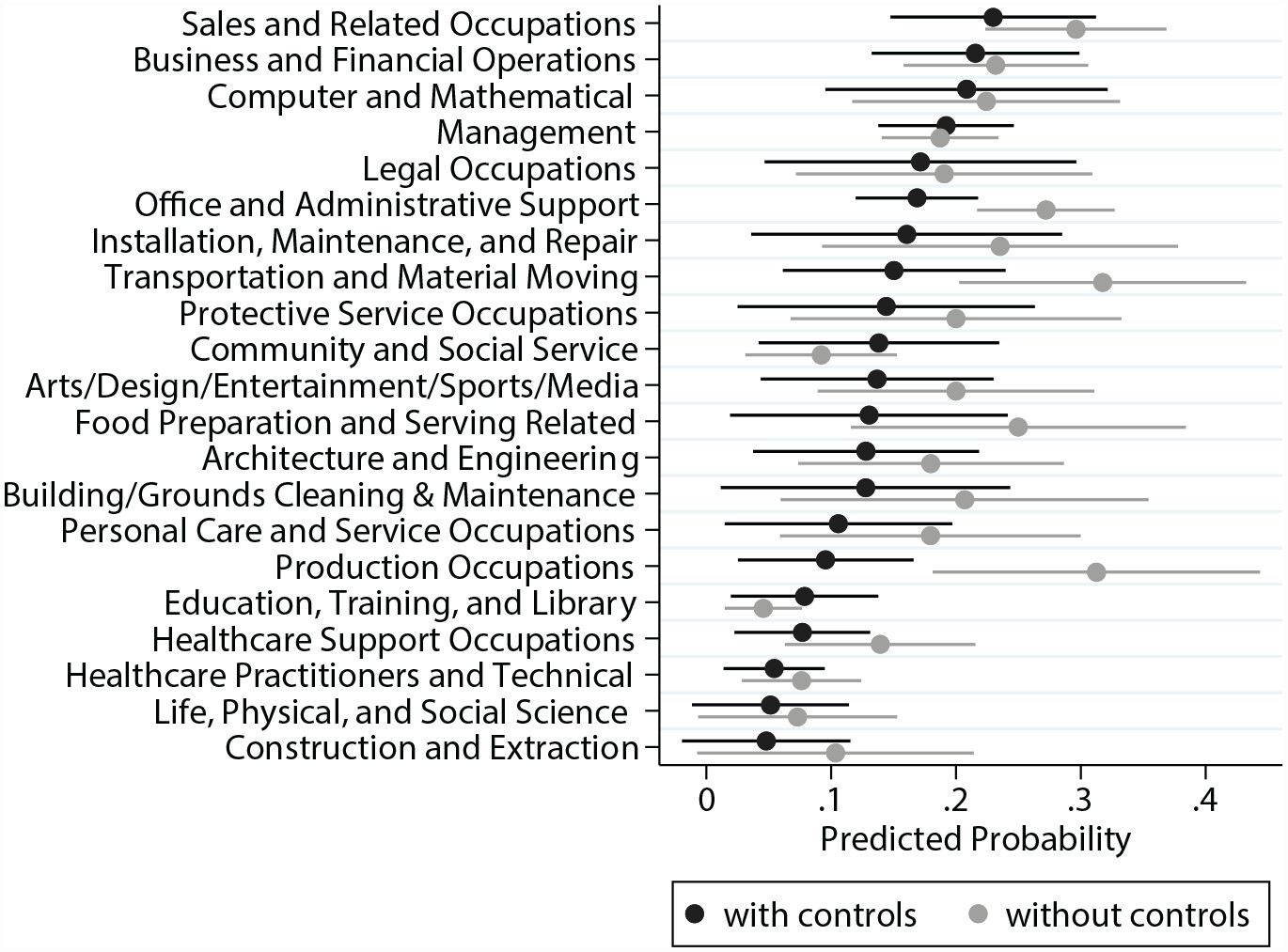
21 July: A first study investigates theories popularized in 2018 that involve jobs being viewed as objectively useless to society.

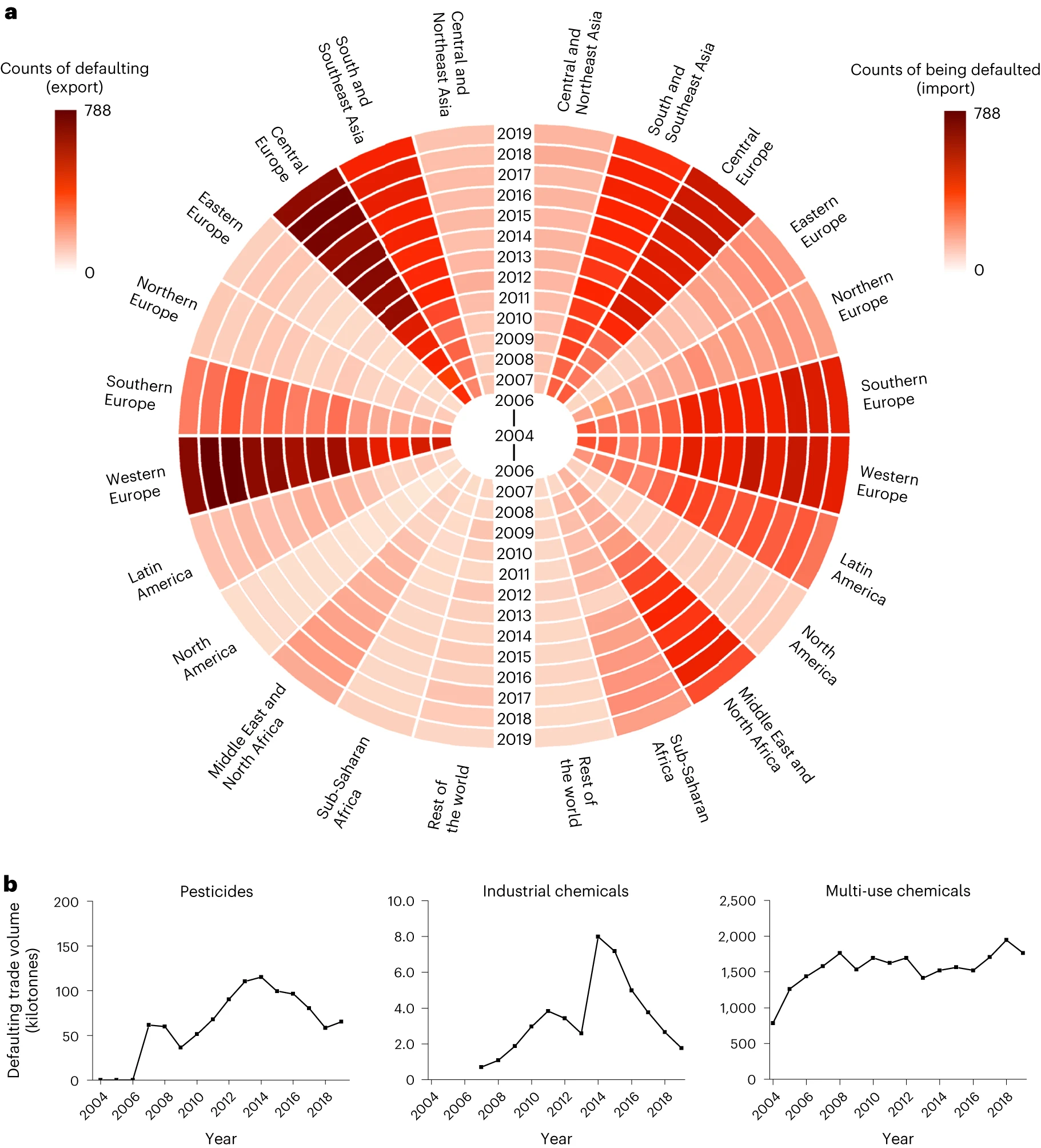
Hazard research: An analysis relating to the Rotterdam Convention shows illegal trade of highly hazardous chemicals continues.

- 21 July – A study provides evidence for elements of the theory of 'Bullshit Jobs', which was formalized and popularized in 2018, showing that many workers consider their jobs of contemporary economics as objectively useless to society.
- 24 July
  - The first detection of water in the terrestrial region of a disk already known to host two or more protoplanets is announced. The discovery, in a young system called PDS 70, is based on data from the James Webb Space Telescope.
  - A study reports a 226% improvement in a memory test of healthy older adults (60–85) from overnight odorant diffuser use for 6 months. The olfactory sense is known to be linked to memory, but its stimulation was previously not trialed where application occurs during sleep.
- 25 July – A controversial study finds that a collapse of the Atlantic meridional overturning circulation (AMOC) is highly likely this century, and may occur as early as 2025. The 95% confidence interval is between 2025 and 2095.
- 26 July – DARPA, in collaboration with NASA, begins work on the first in-orbit demonstration of a nuclear thermal rocket engine.
- 27 July – The longest known cryptobiosis in a nematode is reported, with an organism revived after 46,000 years in Siberian permafrost.
- 28 July – A phylogenetic study proposes a hybrid of the farming and steppe hypotheses for the origin of Indo-European languages, contradicting elements of both.
- Hazard research is published: news outlets start reporting on a study from June finding high levels of PFAS in half of U.S. tap water (5 July), an analysis of the efficacy of the Rotterdam Convention in curbing illegal trade of highly hazardous chemicals shows that large-scale trade of chemicals like tetraethyllead continues (10 July), a researcher reports subterranean climate change urban heat islands may affect the durability of infrastructure and buildings (11 July), a study indicates consumer protection-related validation and quality control for a set of advanced sports supplements such as Dynamine is insufficient, finding most of the tested products either did not contain a detectable amount of the labeled ingredient or substantially deviated from the declared dosage (17 July), a study for the first time determines a wet-bulb temperature threshold where it may be physiologically too hot for daily activity by young healthy adults due to an increase in cardiovascular strain, showing this limit is crossed at a lower temperature than thought previously (20 July), researchers elaborate in a scientific journal why they conclude that "new nuclear is a costly and dangerous distraction" in climate change mitigation (21 July), a study affirms recent findings that suggest revived ancient pathogens from either potential lab-leaks or from permafrost thawing represent significant risks (27 July), scientists provide data about the genetic basis of induced parthenogenesis in sexually reproducing fruit flies which could inform pest control (28 July).
- Promising innovations relating to global challenges are reported: a viable real-time pathogen air quality (pAQ) sensor is demonstrated (10 July), a performant open source AI software for protein design (RFdiffusion) is introduced (11 July), metaresearchers show that AI trained with study-author-networks data could generate scientifically promising "alien" hypotheses that would likely not be considered otherwise (13 July), a study affirms that novel wearable more accessible TD-fNIRS headgear can be used instead of stationary fMRI with new findings about neurological effects of psychedelics (19 July), researchers demonstrate a DNA-sequencing-based technique to more effectively curb illegal sealife trade at warehouses and boats (19 July), a study provides an overview and living review of open source LLMs, assessing the levels of openness of their differentiated elements and reviewing the risks of relying on proprietary software or the importance of open source AI (19 July), news outlets start reporting on study from June demonstrating record solar-to-hydrogen efficiencies (20 July), multimodal biomedical Med-PaLM M is introduced (26 July).
- Promising results of health and medical research are reported: further evidence that breastfeeding is important for the cognitive child development due to its unique ingredients (11 July), trialed hydroxyapatite toothpaste – which can also include fluoride in addition – against caries (18 July), gene therapy eyedrops of Vyjuvek, which was approved in May, against blindness (24 July), the second release from the global WikiGuidelines, a practically oriented guideline on the diagnosis and management of infective endocarditis, demonstrates a novel approach that incorporates uncertainties more than conventional guideline reviews (31 July).

=== August ===
- 1 August
  - Global warming: The world's oceans reach a new record high temperature of 20.96 °C, exceeding the previous record in 2016. July is also confirmed as having been the hottest month on record for globally averaged surface air temperatures by a considerable margin.
  - Astrobiologists theorise that low-oxygen planets would be unlikely to produce advanced civilisations, as the discovery of fire requires easy access to open-air combustion, which is only possible when oxygen partial pressure is above 18%.
  - Researchers list and correct common misconceptions about the human microbiome.
- 2 August
  - A small star called TOI-4860 is found to host an unusually large gas giant, named TOI-4860 b. Astronomers believe this pair to be the lowest-mass star hosting such a high-mass planet, challenging theories of planetary formation.
  - Scientists report the discovery of an up to now unknown ancient human hominin that may have lived 300,000 years ago in China.
  - Whale Perucetus colossus of the Eocene is shown to potentially be Earth's heaviest-ever animal with 85–340 t.

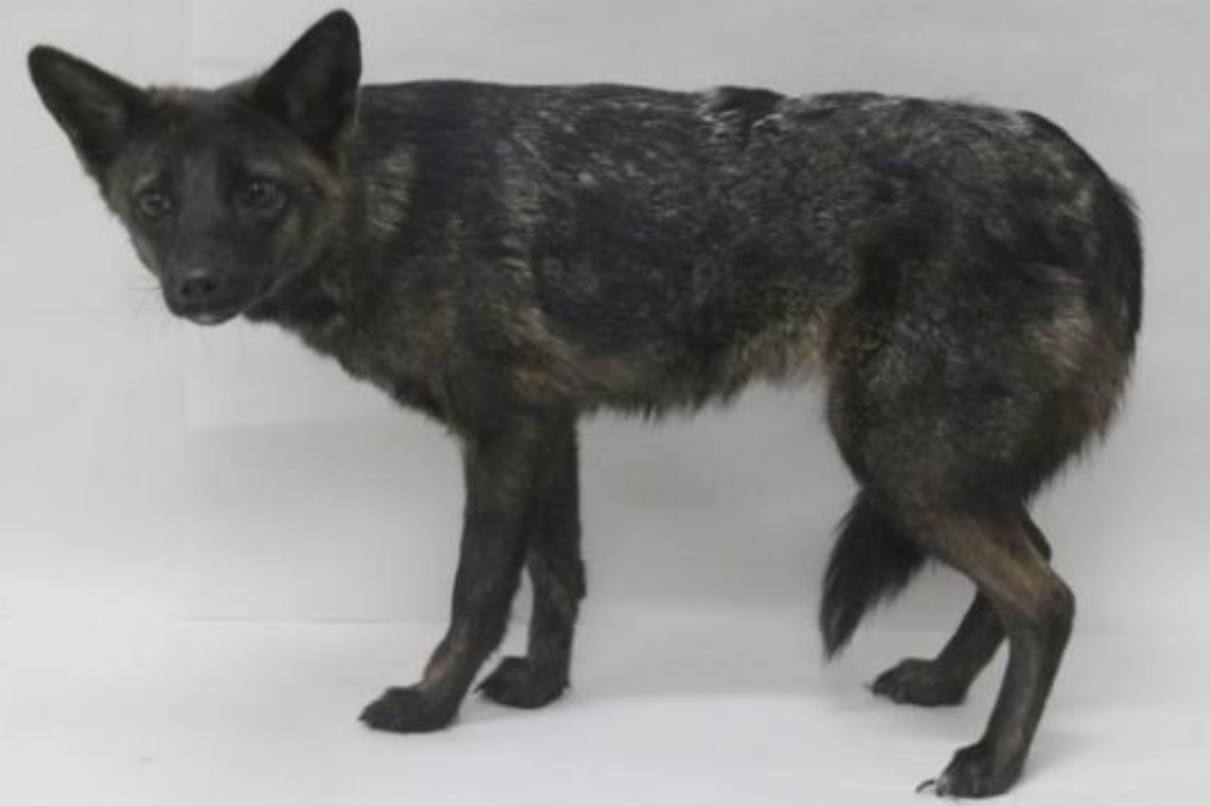
3 August: Dogxim, the first known fox–dog hybrid is reported.

- 3 August – Dogxim, the now-dead first known hybrid of a fox and a domesticated dog, discovered in the wild in Brazil in 2021, is reported.
- 8 August
  - Walking more than 3,967 steps each day is shown to reduce the risk of dying prematurely of any cause, based on a study of 226,000 people around the world. This is considerably less than previous recommendations, which have sometimes cited a figure of 10,000+ steps being needed each day.
  - A study shows activating astrocyte cells in mice with a novel technique makes them stay awake for much longer without making them sleepier or impacting cognition-associated EEG markers.
- 10 August – Scientists at Fermilab report the most precise measurement yet of the magnetic moment of the muon. The particles are shown to wobble faster than predicted by the Standard Model, hinting at a possible fifth fundamental force.
- 11 August
  - The rise in photosynthesis rates around the world caused by the increase of carbon dioxide is found to have slowed dramatically in the 21st century, as the atmosphere has grown drier.
  - A global consortium releases two studies and a database on DNA methylation profiles across 348 mammalian species for use in epigenetic clocks. They provide various new results relating to human aging and animal experiments as well as predictive models that can estimate mammalian tissue age or risk with high accuracy. On 16 August, a study indicates chest radiographs evaluated using AI could be a performant biomarker for aging clocks.
- 12 August – Amateur astronomer Hideo Nishimura announces the discovery of Comet Nishimura (officially, "C/2023 P1 (Nishimura)"), a long-period comet that may be observable in the first days of September 2023 before sunrise.
- 16 August
  - LK-99 is shown to lack the properties required for a room-temperature superconductor under ambient pressure, following weeks of speculation among the scientific community and in the media.
  - Three studies indicate platelets, including or especially FF4, are exerkines with health- and life-extension-potential that rejuvenate aging brains of mice.
- 17 August – Scientists publish what could be the first study both investigating climate-polluting investments and proposing taxation thereof as transformative revenue for climate finance, i.a. indicating "40% of total U.S. emissions were associated with income flows to the highest earning 10% of households" in 2019 with a growing emissions inequality.
- 18 August – A study investigating public policies and spending as well as lobbying activities regarding a transition to a sustainable food system finds that governments "largely ignore the climate-mitigation potential of animal product analogs" and that food production has 'lock-in' problems.
- 23 August
  - India's Chandrayaan-3 becomes the first spacecraft to land near the south pole of the Moon, where frozen water is believed to exist.
  - The complete sequencing of a human Y chromosome with the discovery of 41 additional genes is announced in Nature. On the same day, a study reports the assembly of 43 diverse Y chromosomes, revealing large variability such as a range in size from 45.2 to 84.9 million base-pairs.
  - A study indicates factors contributing to the longevity of long-living organisms can be transferred between species, particularly from naked mole-rats to mice.
- 28 August
  - A study estimates that global warming of 2 °C could result in the mass deaths of 1 billion people by 2100.
  - Astronomers film an impact event, likely by an asteroid, on the planet Jupiter.
  - Researchers demonstrate in two separate studies that quantum simulators, e.g. using trapped ions, can be used to directly observe quantum effects at time-scales far beyond prior approaches, slowing down femtosecond-scale photo-chemical reactions or dynamics around conical intersections 100 billion times.
  - A preprint models Earth as seen from TRAPPIST-1e and indicates that from this 41 light-years distant vantage point, human civilization would be detectable with the James Webb Space Telescope due to atmospheric signatures including air pollution.
- 30 August – Autonomous drones win first races against human champions of FPV drone racing.
- 31 August – Researchers report, based on genetic studies, that a human ancestor population bottleneck (from a possible 100,000 to 1,000 individuals) occurred "around 930,000 and 813,000 years ago ... lasted for about 117,000 years and brought human ancestors close to extinction."

2023's June–July–August season was the warmest on record globally by a large margin, as El Niño conditions continued to develop.

- Promising innovations relating to global challenges are reported: AI-supported mammography screening is demonstrated to have the potential to substantially reduce workload and to possibly improve cancer detection rates (1 Aug), a review outlines applications and challenges of using AI to accelerate science (2 Aug), a low-cost method for targeted long-read RNA sequencing that could accelerate development of diagnostics and treatments (TEQUILA-seq) (8 Aug), a new separate protein database ranks proteins based on how little is known about them (Unknome) (8 Aug), the company that built the world's first hydrogen trains switches to electric models since they are "cheaper to operate" (9 Aug), a cryopreservation method for extinction-threatened corals (23 Aug), a CRISPR-free base editing system without guide RNA that enables also editing chloroplast and mitochondrial genomes with precision (CyDENT) (28 Aug).
- Hazard research is published: a study demonstrates that exposure to microplastics causes neurobehavioral and immunological changes in mammals (mice), varying by age (1 Aug), a study shows people can't reliably detect speech deepfakes with detection for years-old AI software being at 73% (2 Aug), researchers report an unprecedented accuracy of reading keystrokes from audio of smartphone-recordings or video-chats (7 Aug), a global survey study of climate policy researchers finds these experts substantially doubt the prevailing green growth narrative, "underscor[ing] the importance of considering alternative post-growth perspectives" that include approaches of agrowth and degrowth (7 Aug), a study investigating results from a GBD study finds that while age-standardized number of cardiovascular deaths from PM air pollution have declined during the past three decades, all-age DALYs increased by 31%, reaching ~89 million years in 2019, to which years of potential life lost contributed the most with ~82 million years lost during this year (9 Aug), a study indicates a third of men worldwide are infected with genital human papillomavirus which is relevant to cancer prevention, long-term sequelae and vaccination (16 Aug), a preprint confirms smart bulbs may often be one of the weakest links that can be used to gain access to a nearby person's Wi-Fi network (17 Aug), a GBD study projects cure-less osteoarthritis to affect nearly one billion people by 2050 (21 Aug), a study indicates that all types of straws, including paper straws, except for those made of stainless steel and few exceptions, expose people and their environments to PFAS (24 Aug), a study indicates cannabis is often a source of exposure to the contaminants cadmium and lead (30 Aug), researchers demonstrate Web browser extensions can gather passwords from input fields of many of the largest websites (30 Aug).
- Promising results of health and medical research are reported: mice- and dogs-tested AOH1996 against cancer growth and for combination with other anti-cancer agents (1 Aug), a mice-tested engineered probiotic against autoimmunity in the brain as in multiple sclerosis (9 Aug), mice-tested engineered bacteria to detect cancer DNA (10 Aug), a review finds that of the compared insecticide-treated nets to prevent malaria, chlorfenapyr-pyrethroid – or PNP combinations – are overall the most effective and address insecticide-resistance (16 Aug), mice-tested clovibactin against antibiotic-resistant bacterial pathogens (22 Aug), two brain implants achieve milestone performances in words per minute and median word error rate (23 Aug), mice-tested phytosterols – or cholesterol-imbalance-correction more broadly – against aging-associated hearing loss (24 Aug), a pig-tested artificial kidney transplant containing a bioreactor containing renal cells for renal replacement therapy (29 Aug), a Raman-based first test for diagnosing ME/CFS and differentiating between severities with potential relevance to long COVID (31 Aug).

=== September ===
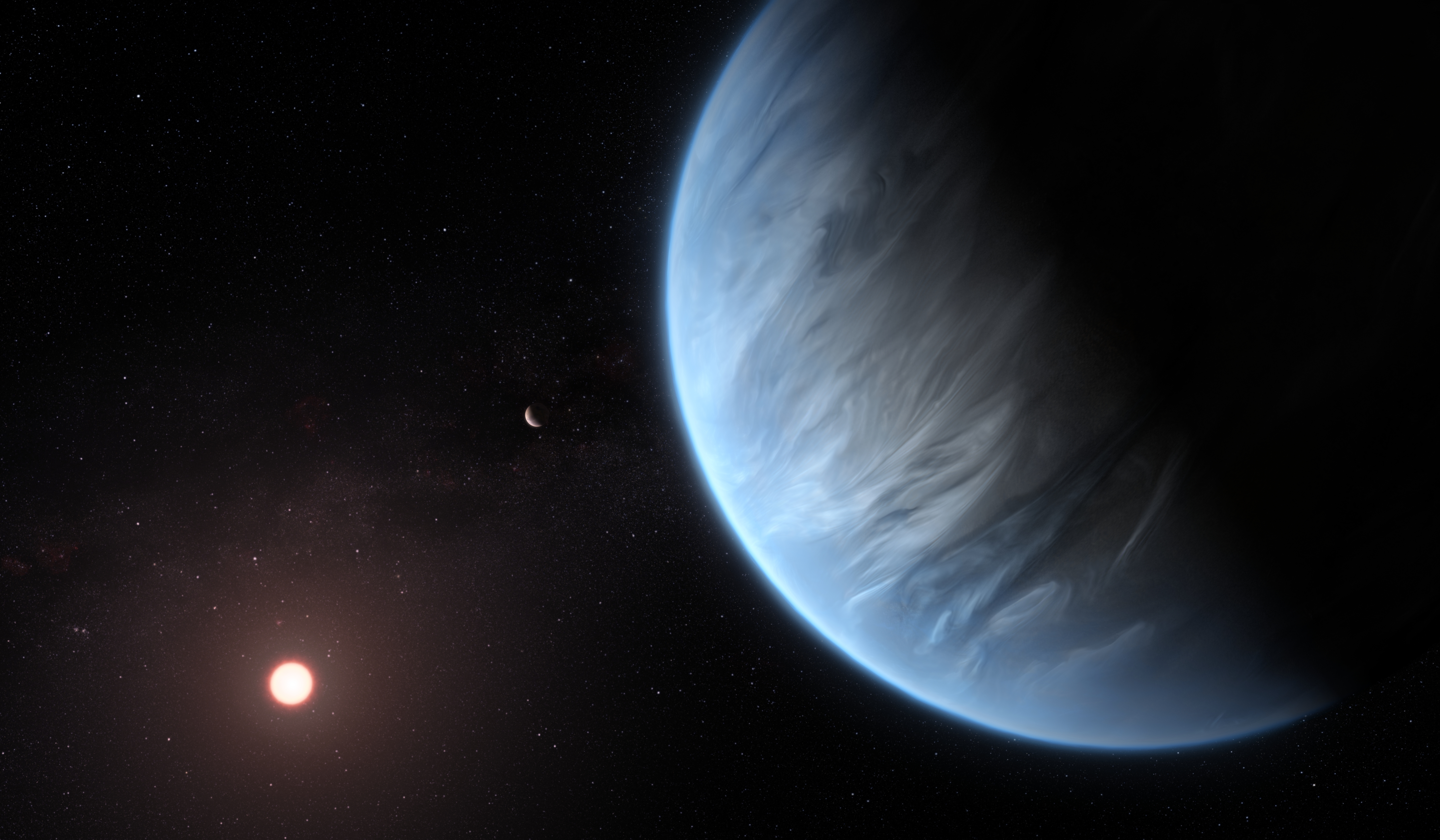
11 September: NASA reports that the exoplanet K2-18b (artist's impression) may be covered in oceans of water.

- 2 September – Astrophysicists question the overall current view of the universe, in the form of the Standard Model of Cosmology, based on the latest James Webb Space Telescope studies.

September 2023 was the warmest September on record globally, with an average surface air temperature 0.5 °C above the temperature of the previous warmest September (2020).

- 5 September – Astronomers identify a vast, bubble-like structure known as Hoʻoleilana in the distribution of relatively nearby galaxies, estimated at 1 billion light-years in diameter and described as the first observation of an individual baryon acoustic oscillation.
- 6 September
  - The discovery of specialized astrocytes that mediate glutamatergic gliotransmission in the central nervous system is announced.
  - Geologists report the discovery of what may be the largest known deposit of lithium, located in the crater of a dormant volcano along the Nevada–Oregon border, and estimated to contain 20 to 40 million tonnes of the metal.
- 7 September
  - A university reports a study (24 Aug) that builds a theory linking a reduction in prey size in the Paleolithic to the evolution of technologies and cognitive abilities as they had to change their behaviors, abilities, weapons, and strategies.
  - An NSF review on sleep provides the first consensus statement with data and preliminary observational studies-based conclusions on the importance of sleep timing regularity regarding health and performance.
- 11 September – The James Webb Space Telescope detects carbon dioxide and methane in the atmosphere of K2-18b, a potentially habitable exoplanet around 8.6 times the mass of Earth. Webb's data suggests that it might be a hycean planet covered in oceans of water, with a hydrogen-rich atmosphere.

18 September: LCLS-II becomes the world's most powerful X-ray laser (illustration of an undulator, the core of a free-electron laser)

- 14 September
  - NASA releases its first public study on UAP (also known as UFOs), and appoints Mark McInerney as the first Director of UAP, to scientifically and transparently study further such occurrences.
  - A new record time for quantum coherence is reported, with a single-photon qubit encoded in a novel superconducting cavity for 34 milliseconds.
  - A genetically engineered marine microorganism is shown to break down polyethylene terephthalate in salt water. This plastic, used in everything from water bottles to clothing, is a significant contributor to microplastic pollution in oceans.
  - A study finds that rivers are warming and losing oxygen faster than oceans. Of nearly 800 rivers, warming occurred in 87% and oxygen loss occurred in 70%. The study projects that within 70 years, river systems could "induce acute death" and extinctions of aquatic species due to long low oxygen levels.
  - Astronomers report studies related to the Hubble tension, a disagreement in results attempting to measure the Hubble constant, and find that the results from the James Webb Space Telescope support earlier results from the Hubble Space Telescope. According to astronomer Adam Riess, "With Webb confirming the measurements from Hubble, the Webb measurements provide the strongest evidence yet that systematic errors in Hubble's Cepheid photometry do not play a significant role in the present Hubble tension ... As a result, the more interesting possibilities remain on the table and the mystery of the tension deepens."
  - Research suggests that replacing half of the beef, chicken, dairy and pork products consumed globally with plant-based alternatives by 2050 could reduce the amount of land used by agriculture by almost a third, bring deforestation for agriculture nearly to a halt, help restore biodiversity through rewilding the land and reduce GHG emissions from agriculture by 31%, paving a clearer path to reaching climate and biodiversity targets. A separate study (6 Sep) using a global food system model suggests that net-negative greenhouse gas emissions could be possible in a sustainable food system achievable with full global deployment of diverse interventions, with the most promising options including hydrogen-powered fertilizer production, livestock feeds, organic and inorganic soil amendments, agroforestry, sustainable seafood harvesting practices, and adoption of flexitarian diets.
- 18 September
  - A new palm oil substitute called PALM-ALT is presented by researchers. The plant-based ingredient is shown to be 70% better for the environment than conventional palm oil and is described as "the holy grail to replace it".
  - The Linac Coherent Light Source at the SLAC National Accelerator Laboratory is upgraded to LCLS-II and successfully demonstrates its first X-rays, which are fired 8,000 times faster and are 10,000 times brighter than the previous version.
  - Scientists calculate that animal genera are going extinct at a rate 35 times faster than expected background rates over the past million years, which they say indicates the planet is experiencing a human-driven sixth mass extinction event and that it is accelerating.
  - A triple-junction solar cell with perovskite-perovskite-silicon subcell configuration is demonstrated with an open-circuit voltage of over 2.8 V, which compares to conventional cells with values ranging between 0.7 V and 0.8 V.
- 19 September
  - RNA is recovered from a Tasmanian tiger, or thylacine, the first isolation and decoding of such molecules from an extinct species.
  - The iconic genus Rafflesia, which includes the world's largest flower, is reported to be at risk of extinction due to habitat loss.
- 20 September
  - Researchers demonstrate that measuring blood pressure in the standing position yields enhanced diagnosis of hypertension.
  - Archaeologists in Zambia find the world's oldest wooden structure, dating back 476,000 years.
- 21 September – Carbon is reported to be present in the subterranean ocean of Europa, based on observations by the James Webb Space Telescope.
- 22 September – Astronomers report studies of the TRAPPIST-1 b exoplanet, finding no signs of an atmosphere, and commenting that the "planet could be a bare rock, have clouds high in the atmosphere or have a very heavy molecule like carbon dioxide that makes the atmosphere too small to detect."

24 September: Samples from the hazardous asteroid Bennu are successfully returned to Earth.

- 24 September – Scientists report the successful return of samples from NASA's OSIRIS-REx mission to the asteroid 101955 Bennu. Shortly after the sample container was retrieved and transferred to an "airtight chamber at the Johnson Space Center in Houston, Texas", the lid on the container was opened. Scientists commented that they "found black dust and debris on the avionics deck of the OSIRIS-REx science canister" on the initial opening. Later study was planned. A news conference on the asteroid sample is scheduled for 11 October 2023.
- 25 September
  - A study on Pangaea Ultima finds that the hypothetical supercontinent will make Earth uninhabitable to most life forms in 250 million years, due to extreme temperatures and radiation.
  - Biologists report the discovery of a ninth species of pangolin, a mammal which is covered with large, protective keratin scales.
- 26 September – Work begins on the seventh and final primary mirror of the Giant Magellan Telescope, which is expected to provide quadruple the image resolution of previous observatories when completed.

Hazard research: the planetary boundaries framework assessment gets updated, showing a sixth limit to be transgressed.

- 27 September
  - Physicists report studies, for the first time, supporting the notion that antimatter particles behave in a similar way as normal matter in a gravitational field.
  - Astronomers report studies suggesting that the rings of Saturn may have resulted from the collision of two moons "a few hundred million years ago".
  - A breakthrough in desalination is achieved by engineers, using a solar-powered device to create freshwater at lower cost than tap water.
- Hazard research is published: an analysis of GBD study data shows pre-50 early-onset cancer cases rose by ~80% in 30 years (5 Sep), a study shows decoupling rates in high-income countries are inadequate for Paris Agreement commitments and suggests post-growth approaches such as demand reduction strategies and reorienting the economy (5 Sep), evidence of impacts of chronic and extreme heat exposure during pregnancy accumulates (7 Sep), a study shows early prevention of type 2 diabetes may save many years of life (11 Sep), a study estimates around 5 million adults died from cardiovascular disease due to lead exposure in 2019 (11 Sep), shortly after a review about biodiversity-related harmful effects on ecosystems by non-native ant invasions (29 Jul), the fifth-costliest invasive species, the red fire ant, is reported to have established itself in the warming Europe via colonies in Sicily (11 Sep), a product testing study shows cleaning products emit substantial amounts of hazardous VOCs, such as chloroform, with the lowest quantities in green fragrance-free products (12 Sep), the planetary boundaries framework assessment gets updated, incorporating freshwater change as a sixth Earth system dimension above its capacity limit (13 Sep), news outlets report on a study (31 Aug) that shows daily aspartame consumption leads to heritable cognitive deficits in mice – and more broadly that the exposome of men may also affect the mental health of the next generation (19 Sep), a study reports an increasing global exposure to air pollution from fires (20 Sep).
- Promising results of health and medical research are reported: non-human vaccinated primates-tested pGal–antigen therapy for suppressing antigen-specific immune responses and against autoimmune diseases, this type of vaccine is called "inverse vaccine" (7 Sep), 3D cell-culture tested exercise-induced hormone irisin against Aβ Alzheimer's disease pathology (8 Sep), identified diverse features strongly associated with long COVID for better diagnosis (25 Sep).
- Promising innovations relating to global challenges are reported: a study winning an international competition demonstrates an approach that predicted 70% of earthquakes, suggesting some form of earthquake prediction may be feasible in the future (5 Sep), researchers release a large set of audiobooks for books in Project Gutenberg created automatically via generative AI with near-natural voice (7 Sep), a news outlet reports on a natural language system, demonstrated on 27 July, that can provide explanations for the conclusion-making of machine learning models for explainable AI (12 Sep), researchers report a production method for spider silk fibers from gene-edited transgenic silkworms for a sustainable alternative material six times stronger than Kevlar (20 Sep), a new generation of sleeping trains is presented amid a comeback of this transport technology in Europe as demand for more comfortable travel modes than overnight buses and sustainable transport rises (30 Sep).

=== October ===
- 1 October – Astronomers propose a new, more comprehensive, view of the cosmos, which includes all objects in the universe, and suggested that the universe may have begun with instantons, and may be a black hole.
- 2 October
  - Katalin Karikó and Drew Weissman share the Nobel Prize in Physiology or Medicine for their work in developing mRNA vaccines, which played a crucial role in the COVID-19 pandemic.
  - Pairs of Jupiter-sized rogue planets, unconnected to any star, are spotted in the Orion Nebula by the James Webb Space Telescope. They are termed Jupiter-Mass Binary Objects, or "JuMBOs" for short.
- 3 October
  - Pierre Agostini, Ferenc Krausz and Anne L'Huillier share the Nobel Prize in Physics for illuminating how electrons move, and related techniques that permit scientists to capture the motions of subatomic particles moving at extremely fast speeds.
  - Biologists report studies of animals (over 1,500 different species) that found same-sex behavior (not necessarily related to human orientation) may help improve social stability by reducing conflict within the groups studied.
- 4 October
  - Moungi G. Bawendi, Louis E. Brus and Alexei I. Ekimov share the Nobel Prize in Chemistry for the discovery and development of quantum dot nanoparticles.
  - A review reports 25 consensus statements of 248 scientists, with a total of 2,697 peer-reviewed publications on light and circadian clocks since 2008, relating to its impacts on health. They find despite the health concerns, "less than 0.5% of the lighting sold today can modify spectral content and intensity between day and night". On 9 October, the largest cross-sectional study about night-light exposure and psychiatric disorders supports and complements earlier results that indicate causal links.

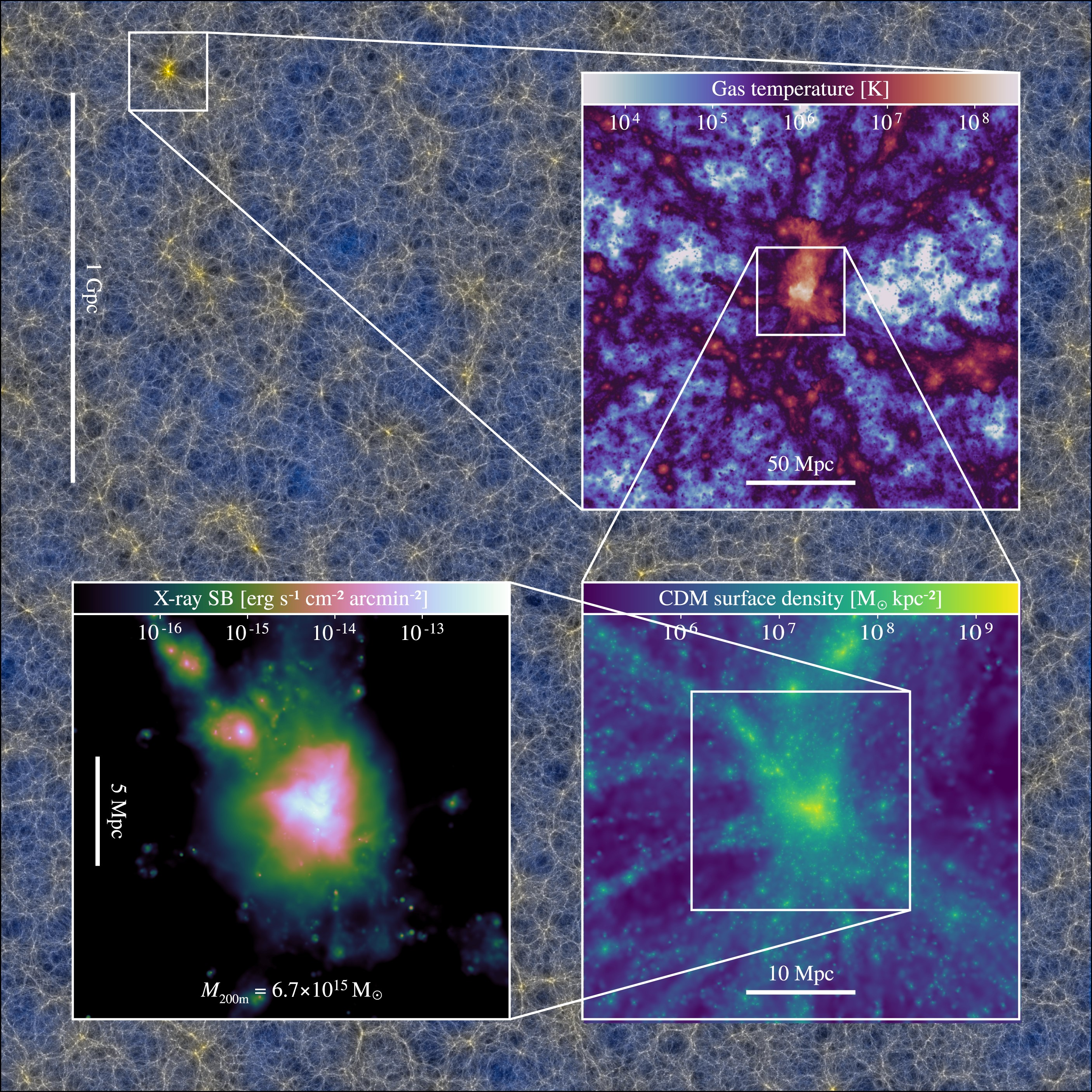
12 October: The most comprehensive cosmological simulations are reported with challenging results

- 5 October – Biologists report studies confirming the age of human footprints found in the state of New Mexico in the United States to be "up to 23,000 years old", the earliest found traces of people in North America.
- 10 October – Gene-edited chickens with partial resistance to bird flu are developed at the University of Edinburgh's Roslin Institute.
- 11 October
  - The first known afterglow of a collision between two exoplanets is captured by astronomers, who observe the event around a Sun-like star located 1,800 light years away.
  - The recovered capsule from the OSIRIS-REx sample-return mission, that sampled the asteroid 101955 Bennu, is opened to reveal a "first look" at the asteroid sample contents.
- 12 October
  - An expert elicitation study reports potential scenarios of civil unrest in the UK in the coming decades, due to food shortages caused by extreme weather.
  - A study highlights the exponential growth of satellite constellations in Earth orbit, which is "creating serious safety and long-term sustainability challenges" and requires urgent action by the International Telecommunication Union.
  - A review summarizes the research on the transition from unconsciousness to consciousness in humans, integrating new neuroscientific findings about the content and structure of infant consciousness.
  - A study reports transient windows of decision reactivity to external stimuli during sleep and signatures of conscious processing in lucid REM sleep.
  - Three studies report specifications and results of the largest cosmological simulations that incorporate both dark matter and normal matter, further deepening the S_{8} tension challenge to the standard cosmological model.

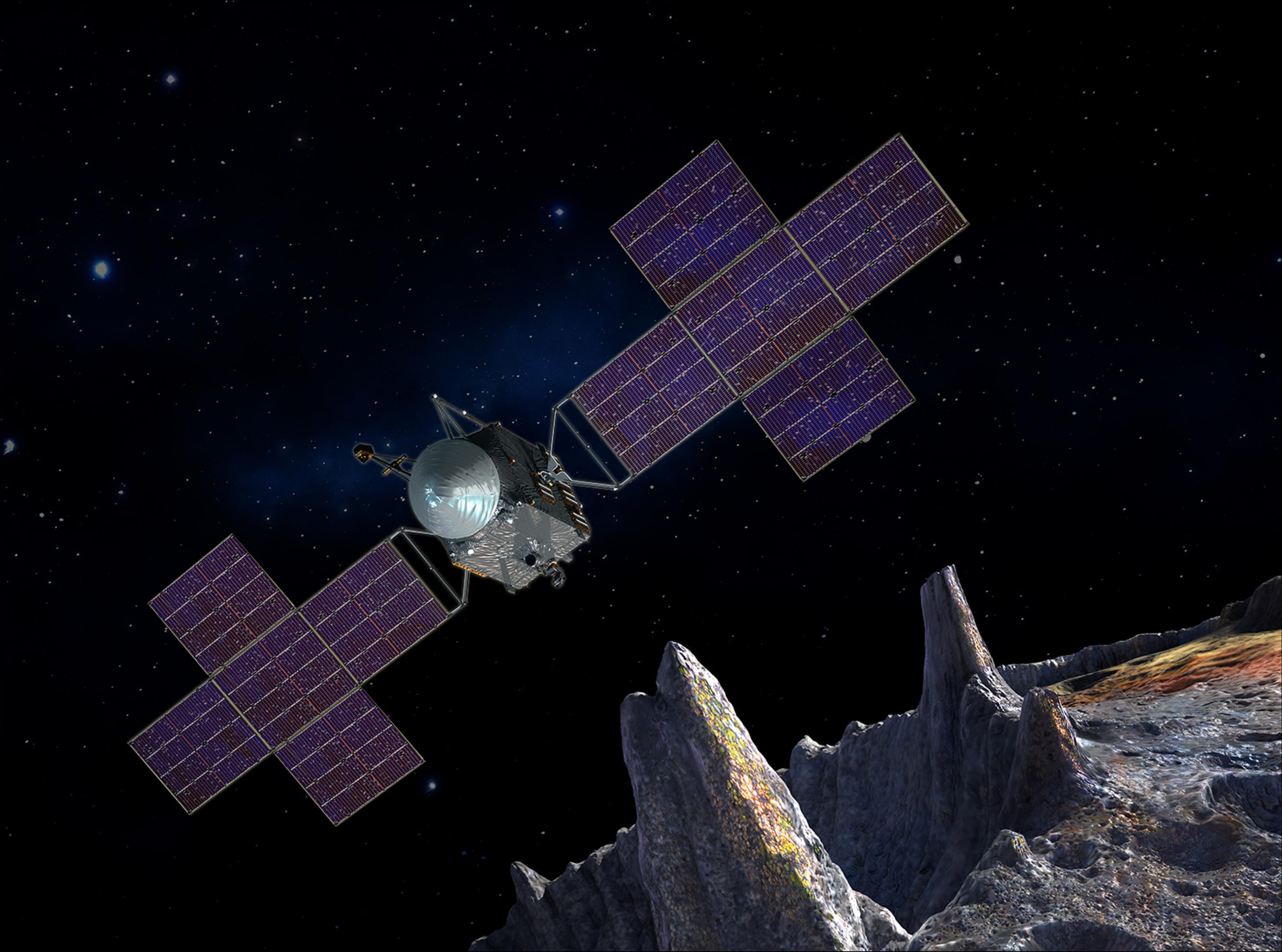
13 October: Launch of NASA's Psyche mission.

- 13 October
  - NASA launches its Psyche mission to visit the large metallic asteroid 16 Psyche.
  - A meta-analysis finds that three doses of a COVID-19 vaccine offer 69% effectiveness against long COVID, while two doses offer 37% efficacy.
  - 21 studies provide new insights about the human brain at the cellular level such as identifying and characterizing differentially expressed genes in shared cell-types in a language-associated region of the cortex compared to other apes and showing human variability of the expression of 150–250 genes for most cell types of profiled cortical tissues of 75 individuals with brain diseases.
  - A policy studies review of 200 guidelines about AI ethics, safety and governance summarizes resonating principles and common concerns, providing an evaluating situation report amid what it calls an "AI ethics boom".
- 14 October – The Joint European Torus nuclear fusion laboratory conducts its final experiments after 40 years in operation.

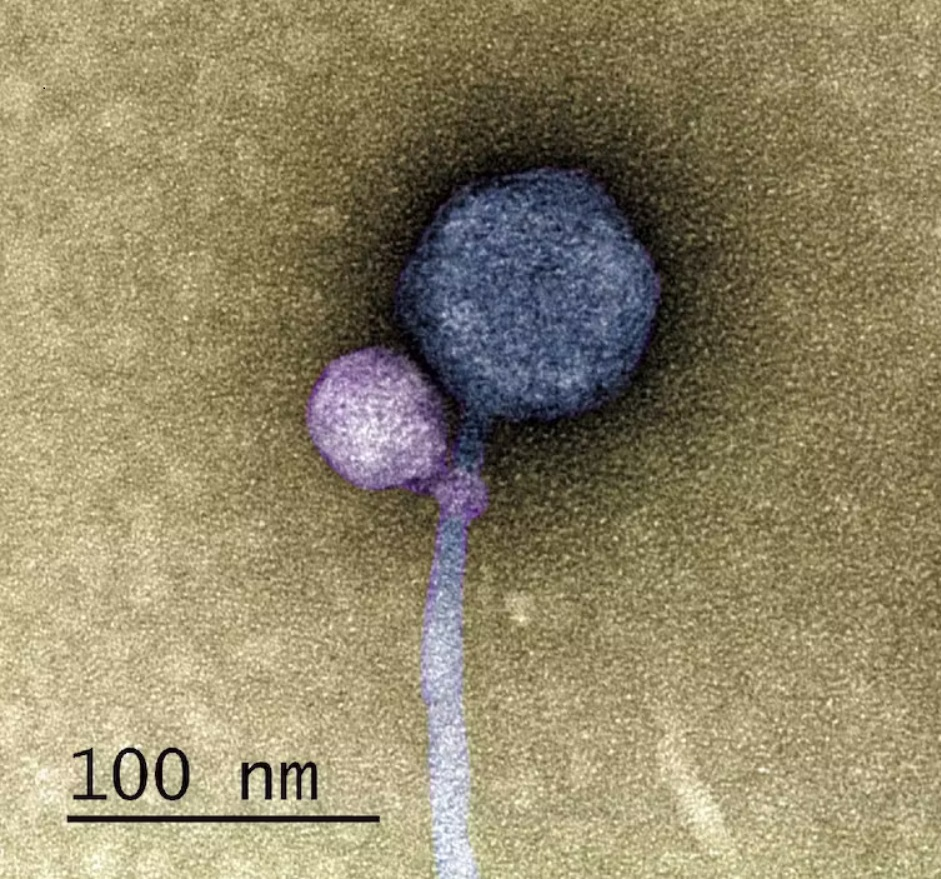
31 October: The first discovery of a virus, phage MiniFlayer, that attaches to another helper virus is reported.

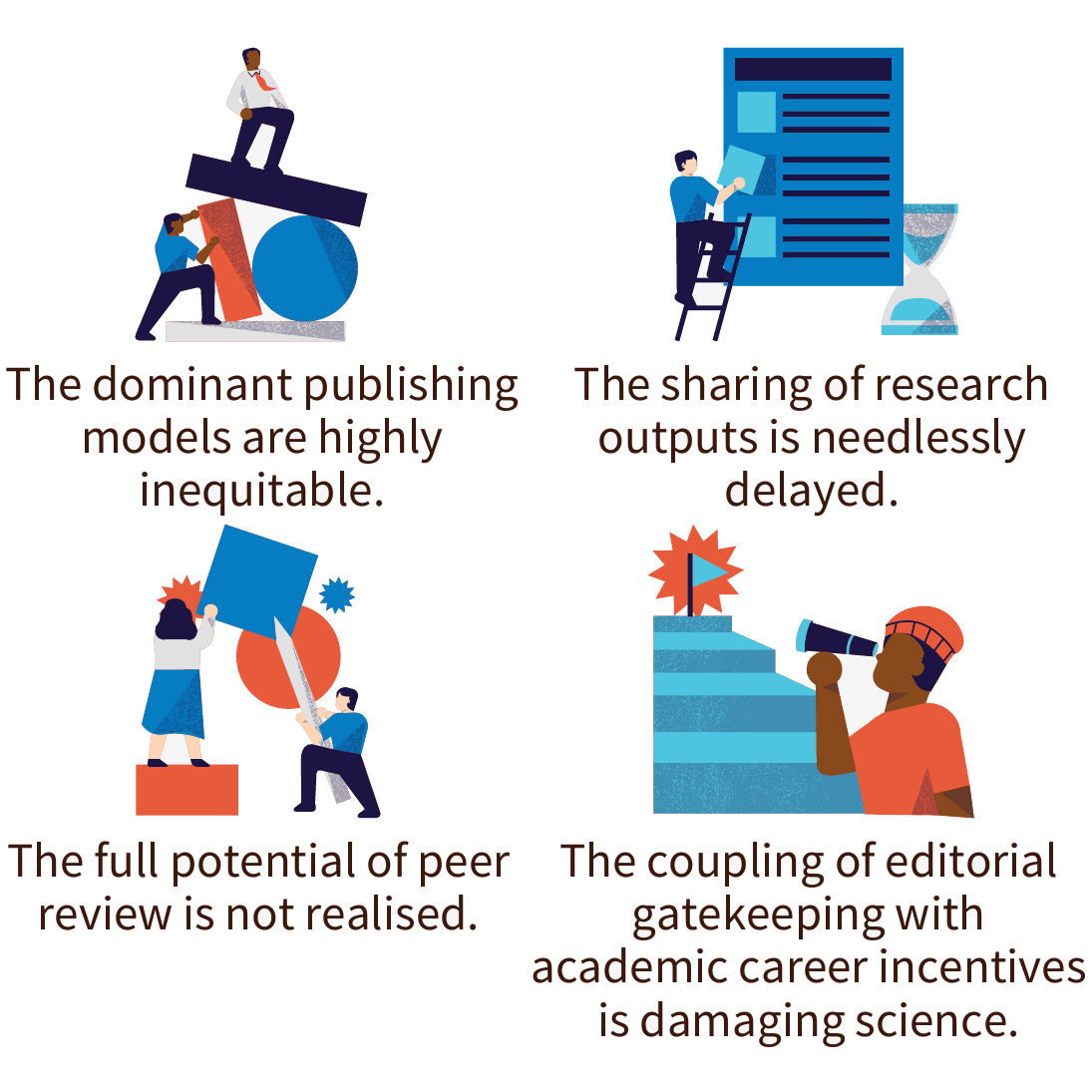
31 October: The coalition behind Plan S publishes a proposal to the scientific community for moving scholarly communication towards open science practices to address alleged issues in scholarly communication.

- 16 October
  - An overview of detecting life on Earth from distant star-based systems is published.
  - Scientists propose a new law of evolution, extending the established Darwinian ones, and described as the "law of increasing functional information".
  - 21 species in the United States are declared extinct by the US Fish and Wildlife Service. These are one mammal, ten birds, two fish, and eight mussels.
  - Scientists report the facial reconstruction of Pierolapithecus catalaunicus, a 12 million years old great ape.
- 19 October
  - Astronomers report that FRB 20220610A, a Fast Radio Burst, took 8 billion years to reach Earth.
  - Astronomers report the finding, for the first time, of Ultra-Fast Radio Bursts lasting millionths of a second.
  - A new edge-based computer processor called NorthPole is developed by IBM Research, able to run AI-based image recognition apps 22 times faster than chips currently on the market.
  - A study links a large marine macrofauna population collapse mortality event, the death of ~10 billion snow crabs around 2018, to marine heatwaves that caused mass starvation.
- 20 October – A study reports evidence of recent plant adaptive evolution, involving a leaf color change from green to red of a woodsorrel, due to urban heat islands. It provides information regarding evolutionary dynamics of climate change and human adaptation.
- 23 October – A significant breakthrough in treating cervical cancer is reported, with participants in a Phase III trial seeing a 35% reduction in the risk of both mortality or the disease returning. The study used a combination of existing, cheap drugs ahead of usual radiotherapy treatment.
- 24 October
  - California-based startup Atom Computing announces a 1,225-qubit quantum computer, the first to break the 1,000+ barrier, which it plans to release in 2024.
  - NASA provides updated details of its Nancy Grace Roman Space Telescope, planned for launch by 2027.
  - JT-60SA, the world's largest fusion reactor, located in Japan, achieves first plasma.
  - A study reviewing the 'planetary vital signs' reports deeply concerning patterns and records, minimal progress of mitigation by humanity, and a set of broad policy recommendations. It represents an annual update to a 2019 study that has been signed by now 15,000 researchers to track the state of climate change and its mitigation.
- 25 October – Scientists, helped by information derived from the Mars InSight lander, report that the planet Mars has a radioactive magma ocean under its crust.
- 26 October – Astronomers report studies that suggest for the first time that the planet Venus may have had plate tectonics during ancient times, and, as a result, may have had a cooler more habitable environment, and possibly one capable of generating life forms.
- 28 October – Positive results are reported in a study with rats of the experimental vaccine calixcoca meant for treating cocaine addiction. Clinical trials in humans are the next step of the study.
- 30 October – A study finds that the world's remaining carbon budget for 1.5 °C of global warming is only half that of previous estimates, at less than 250 gigatonnes of carbon dioxide, or around six years of annual worldwide emissions.
- 31 October
  - The first discovery of a virus, phage MiniFlayer, that attaches to another helper virus is reported.
  - The coalition of research organizations and science funders behind Plan S publishes a proposal for moving scholarly communication towards open science practices that are more transparent, accessible, efficient and without author fees.
- Hazard research is published: a study further confirms noncompensable moist heat extremes will be beyond bounds of past human evolutionary environments for billions of people (9 Oct), an analysis calls for health policy regarding unhealthy ultra-processed foods (9 Oct), an analysis calls for action regarding the summarized environmental footprint of bitcoin mining (9 Oct), a global assessment of risk from increasing pollinator loss to crop pollination shows cocoa and coffee at high risk (12 Oct), a training data poisoning technique, 'Nightshade', against generative AI software specific to select prompts is described (20 Oct), a study indicates low deep sleep percentage is a modifiable dementia risk factor (30 Oct).
- Promising innovations relating to global challenges are reported: researchers release an AI system, SIDE, to improve source-quality and reliability of Wikipedia by identifying problematic citations and recommending better ones to editors (19 Oct), researchers demonstrate potential AI applications in science such as for research suggestion tools and keeping track of accelerating scientific output.
- Promising results of health and medical research are reported: breast-cancer detection via cell-free tumor DNA in breastmilk (5 Oct), monkey-tested genetically edited humanized kidney xenotransplant (11 Oct), trialed electrical brain stimulation methods against brain disorders (19 Oct), aged-rats tested blood plasma fraction E5 from young pig blood against aging as measured by cognitive function and organ biomarkers (24 Oct).

=== November ===
- 1 November
  - Amid an ongoing boom in artificial intelligence, the UK hosts the world's first international summit devoted to safely managing the technology.
  - Computer simulations reveal that remnants of a protoplanet named Theia could be inside the Earth, left over from a giant collision in ancient times, which afterwards formed the Moon.
  - Dinkinesh, previously thought to be a single asteroid, is revealed by NASA's Lucy probe to in fact be a binary pair.
- 5 November – A new record high efficiency of 33.9% is reported for a silicon-perovskite tandem solar cell. This also surpasses the Shockley-Quieser theoretical limit of 33.7% of single junction solar cells for the first time.
- 6 November – Scientists release the first connectome of neuropeptide signaling in an animal nervous system (C. elegans). On 1 November, a functional atlas of signal propagation in 23,433 pairs of neurons across the worm's head by direct optogenetic activation is published. On 17 November, the development of fluorescent neuropeptide sensors is reported.
- 7 November – A study finds that "catastrophic ecosystem collapse" of UK forests is likely within the next 50 years, due to a wide range of factors.
- 8 November – In 10 studies, researchers of the Sc2.0 project report yeast with a half-synthetic genome.
- 9 November – Surgeons report the first human eye transplant; the patient did not regain sight in the transplanted eye.
- 10 November – A new scalable technique for carbon nanotube-based MOSFETs is demonstrated.
- 13 November
  - White faces generated by artificial intelligence (AI) are perceived as more real than actual human faces while the same is not true for people of colour in a study.
  - A study proposes characteristics of human evolution underlie current global environmental problems, favoring groups of increased size and group-level cultural traits of greater environmental exploitation. Based on the hypothesis that the primary mechanism of evolutionary inheritance has shifted from genes to culture, it suggests cultural evolution patterns to date work against global collective solutions to Anthropocene challenges.
  - An umbrella review summarizes the research on benefits and risks associated with digital media use by youths, suggesting caregivers, policymakers and researchers should continue to move away from prevailing oversimplified recommendations to reduce screen time to instead focus on the types of screen use.
- 15 November
  - Geologists report that Iceland may face "decades" of volcanic instability, following a series of recent eruptions on the Reykjanes Peninsula, breaking an 800-year hiatus.
  - 3D printing of hair follicles on lab-grown skin is reported.
- 16 November
  - Casgevy, a world-first gene therapy that aims to cure sickle-cell disease and transfusion-dependent beta thalassemia, is approved by the UK's Medicines and Healthcare products Regulatory Agency, becoming the first drug using CRISPR to be licensed.
  - Scientists report first evidence that unfamiliar groups of nonhuman primates, particularly bonobos, are capable of cooperating with each other.
  - The International Cryosphere Climate Initiative (ICCI) publishes its annual State of the Cryosphere Report. It warns of rapid, irreversible sea-level rise from Earth's ice sheets, which could potentially reach 12–20 metres in the coming centuries.
- 17 November – The global average temperature temporarily exceeds 2 °C above the pre-industrial average for the first time in recorded history.
- 20 November – A study of censorship in science finds it to be often driven by scientists themselves, motivated by prosocial concerns or reputation protection.
- 22 November – An autonomous excavator is demonstrated. Using sensors, the machine can generate 3D maps of a construction site, localising individual blocks and stones in order to build a wall.
- 23 November
  - Astrophysicists report the detection of "Amaterasu", the second highest-energy cosmic ray ever known, second only to the Oh-My-God particle of 1991. Amaterasu originated from the Local Void and its energy exceeded 240 exa-electron volts (EeV).
  - Researchers report the deep learning-based discovery of nearly 200 functionally diverse natural machineries for CRISPR gene editing.
- 26 November – Astronomers report evidence, for the first time, of an overmassive black hole galaxy (O.B.G.), the result of "heavy black hole seed formation from direct collapse", an alternative way of producing a black hole other than the collapse of a dead star. This discovery was found in studies of UHZ1, a very early galaxy containing a quasar, by the Chandra X-ray Observatory and James Webb Space Telescope.
- 29 November
  - Astronomers report the discovery of a star, HD 110067, that contains six sub-Neptune exoplanets with radii ranging from 1.94R⊕ to 2.85R⊕.
  - The first example of a planet-forming disk beyond the Milky Way galaxy is reported by astronomers using the ALMA in Chile. The system, designated as HH 1177, is located in the Large Magellanic Cloud, about 160,000 light years away.
- 30 November
  - Researchers demonstrate multicellular microbots grown from a human cell, "anthrobots", that can move around in tissues in vitro.
  - A trial comparing a healthy vegan and a healthy omnivorous diet in identical twins finds the former to be substantially better according to cardiometabolic measures like LDL-C after 8 weeks.
- Promising innovations relating to global challenges are reported: an efficient electrocaloric heat pump for sustainable cooling (16 Nov), taste-tested bioreactor-grown cultured coffee (17 Nov), an autonomous laboratory for synthesis of inorganic powders, the A-Lab (29 Nov), a solar tower design using downdraft technology for hot and dry weather areas that could generate twice the electricity of solar updraft systems and operate at night, the Twin-Technology Solar System (TTSS) (30 Nov).
- Promising results of health and medical research are reported: phase 2-trialed Mazdutide against type-2 diabetes (9 Nov), phase 1-trialed lepodisiran against cardiovascular risk factor lipoprotein (12 Nov), rat-tested depot technology for sustained delivery of GLP-1 receptor agonists against the need for frequent injections (21 Nov).
- Hazard research is published: a study indicates common food allergies are not benign but are associated with increased risk of cardiovascular mortality (9 Nov), in a commentary, scientists warn that to "reduce plastic pollution efficiently and economically, policy should prioritize regulating and reducing upstream production rather than downstream pollution cleanup" as "popularized by The Ocean Cleanup" (9 Nov), social unconnectedness confirmed as likely substantial mortality risk factor using UK Biobank data (10 Nov), nanoplastic pollution and consumption identified as a likely Parkinson's disease risk factor (17 Nov), a review cautions "robust evidence has yet to emerge that [air treatment technologies] are effective at reducing respiratory or gastrointestinal infections in real world settings" (20 Nov), a content analysis of packaging marketing of infant and toddler foods in supermarkets suggests protection of young children's diets from harmful influence of food marketing is needed (28 Nov), a preprint suggests some large language models have an 'extractable memorization' flaw by which training data can be extracted at affordable costs by queries (28 Nov).

=== December ===
- 6 December
  - Scientists, for the first time, report a recently discovered area on the current planet Earth, particularly in the Puna de Atacama territory of South America, which may be similar to ancient Earth, and the related environment of the first life forms on Earth – as well as – similar to possibly hospitable conditions on the planet Mars during earlier Martian times.
  - Google DeepMind announces its Gemini multimodal language model, which it claims has advanced "reasoning capabilities" and can outperform GPT-4 on a variety of tasks.
- 7 December
  - A gene therapy based on three transcription factors, Oct4, Sox2, and Klf4 (OSK), is shown to provide sustained vision recovery in mice affected by glaucoma.
  - Physicists report future proposed plans for the next ten years. These proposals are intended to help better understand some of the current concerns of particle physics, including challenges to the Standard Model, and involve studies primarily dealing with gravity, black holes, dark matter, dark energy, Higgs boson, muons, neutrinos, and more.
  - Quantum entanglement of molecules is achieved for the first time.
  - A comprehensive review of ancient carbon dioxide levels and corresponding temperatures is published by a consortium of more than 80 researchers from 16 nations. Their study finds that current levels of atmospheric carbon dioxide are the highest in at least 14 million years, much longer ago than some existing assessments indicate.
- 11 December – Researchers demonstrate the use of biological-electronic hybrid Organoid Intelligence, 'Brainoware', for speech recognition.
- 12 December – Asteroid 319 Leona occults the bright star Betelgeuse for about 12 seconds as viewed on a narrow path from China to Mexico.
- 13 December
  - Scientists report that the contents of the sample-return mission of the OSIRIS-REx mission to asteroid Bennu revealed organic molecules as well as unknown materials which require more study to have a better idea of their composition and makeup.
  - The smallest known brown dwarf, weighing just three to four times the mass of Jupiter, is discovered in star cluster IC 348 by astronomers using the James Webb Space Telescope.

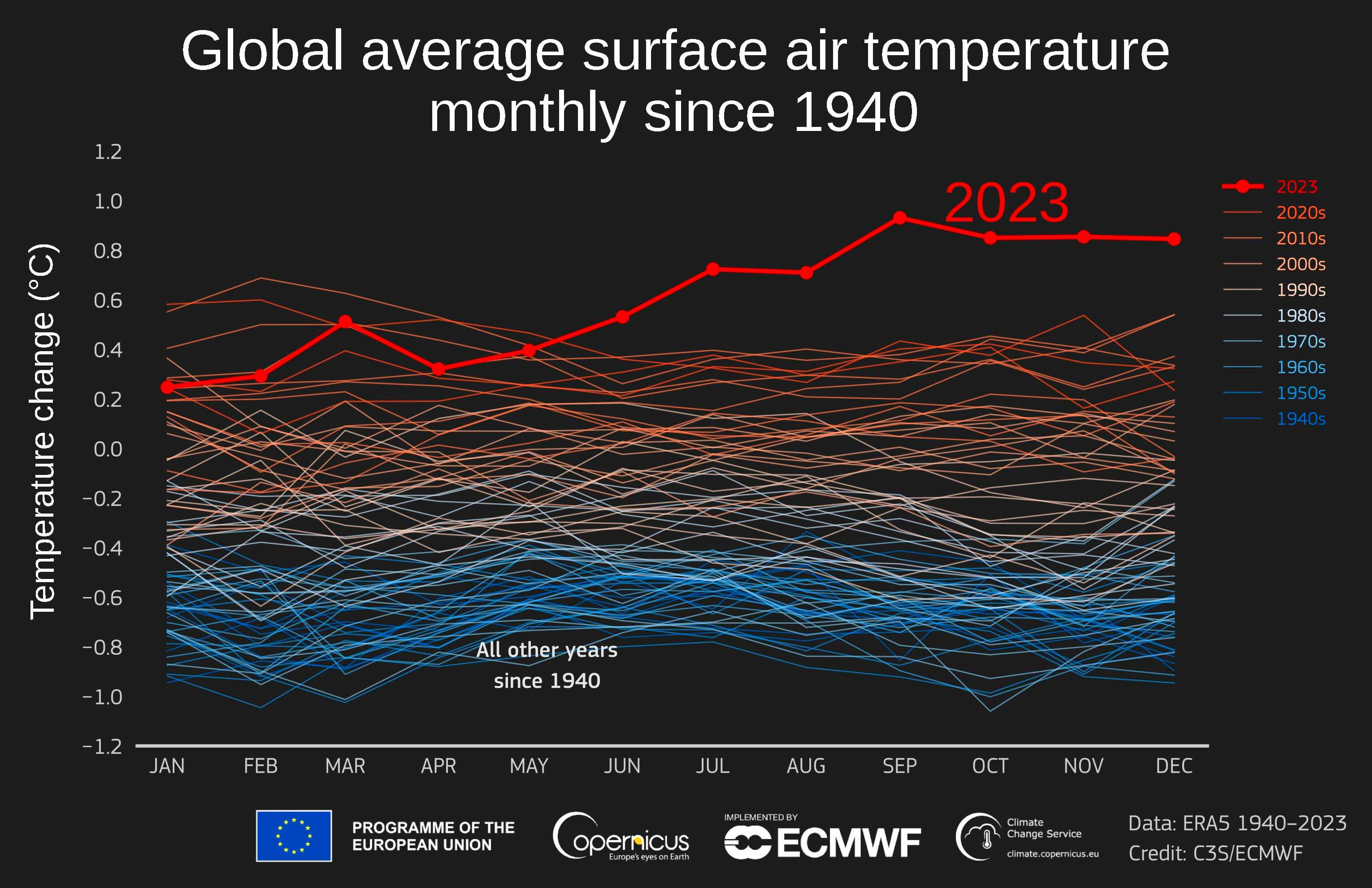
2023 saw the highest global average surface temperature in recorded history.

- 14 December
  - Scientists report that genes inherited by modern humans from Neanderthals and Denisovans may biologically influence the daily routine of modern humans, specifically their chronotype.
  - Astronomers report the first time discovery, in the plumes of Enceladus, moon of the planet Saturn, of hydrogen cyanide, a possible chemical essential for life as we know it, as well as other organic molecules, some of which are yet to be better identified and understood. According to the researchers, "these [newly discovered] compounds could potentially support extant microbial communities or drive complex organic synthesis leading to the origin of life."
- 15 December – Google DeepMind claims to have made the first ever scientific discovery with an AI chatbot by building a fact-checker to filter out useless outputs, leaving useful solutions to mathematical or computing problems.
- 19 December – COVID-19: The World Health Organization designates JN.1, part of the BA.2.86 SARS-CoV-2 lineage, as its own variant of interest. This follows a recent, rapid rise in case numbers around the world.
- 20 December
  - A new class of antibiotic candidates, able to kill methicillin-resistant Staphylococcus aureus (MRSA) is identified using deep learning.
  - An experimental study reports online search to evaluate the truthfulness of false news articles increases the probability of believing them, especially for those for whom search engines return lower-quality information. It suggests media literacy programs with tested strategies and solutions for identified search engines issues are needed.
- 28 December – A new model of the largest neutron stars finds an 80–90% chance that they contain quark-matter cores.
- 29 December – A metascience study estimates the total amount of article processing charges paid to publish with open access in journals controlled by the five large commercial publishers from 2015–2018 to be $1.06 billion. On 12 December, it is reported that the number of paper retractions has hit a new record of over 10,000 in 2023, with around 80% coming from journals owned by Hindawi, mostly special issues overseen by guest editors.
- Promising innovations relating to global challenges are reported: a flying firehose robot, the Dragon Firefighter (22 Dec), completion of the first functional 105 meters tall more-modular Modvion wooden wind turbine is reported (28 Dec).
- Promising results of health and medical research are reported: news reports about a portable EEG helmet with significant accuracy of decoding thought words to text, DeWave (12 Dec), carrots against cancer-risk (17 Dec).
- Hazard research is published: the annual Global Carbon Budget study finds fossil CO_{2} emissions are still rising when if they stayed the same, the 50% likelihood to limit global warming to 1.5 °C would be exceeded around 2031 (5 Dec), the genetic testing company 23andMe confirms that the genetic privacy of around 7 million customers has been violated in the 23andMe data leak (5 Dec), a study using plasma proteomics aging clocks suggests nearly 20% of the population may show strongly accelerated age in one of 11 major organs, which it links to higher mortality risk (6 Dec), cumulative loneliness in mid-to-later life, a growing public health concern, is confirmed as potential substantial excess mortality risk factor with U.S. data (11 Dec), news outlets report on a study (13 Oct) finding ~82% of fish samples from two Michigan watersheds exceed daily consumption limit for adults of total PFOS (12 Dec), a study robustifies the link between women's preconception exposure to phthalates and lower fecundability, changes in reproductive hormones, and increased inflammation using EAGeR trial data (13 Dec), a study of meal timing using French NutriNet-Santé data indicates longer nighttime fasting periods may be superior to breakfast skipping in intermittent fasting (14 Dec), one of the first horizon scan risk screening studies by region on invasive species threats identifies 40 high-risk potential invaders to Florida (14 Dec).

== See also ==
- Category:Science events
- Category:Science timelines
- List of emerging technologies
- List of years in science
