= Inverse vaccine =

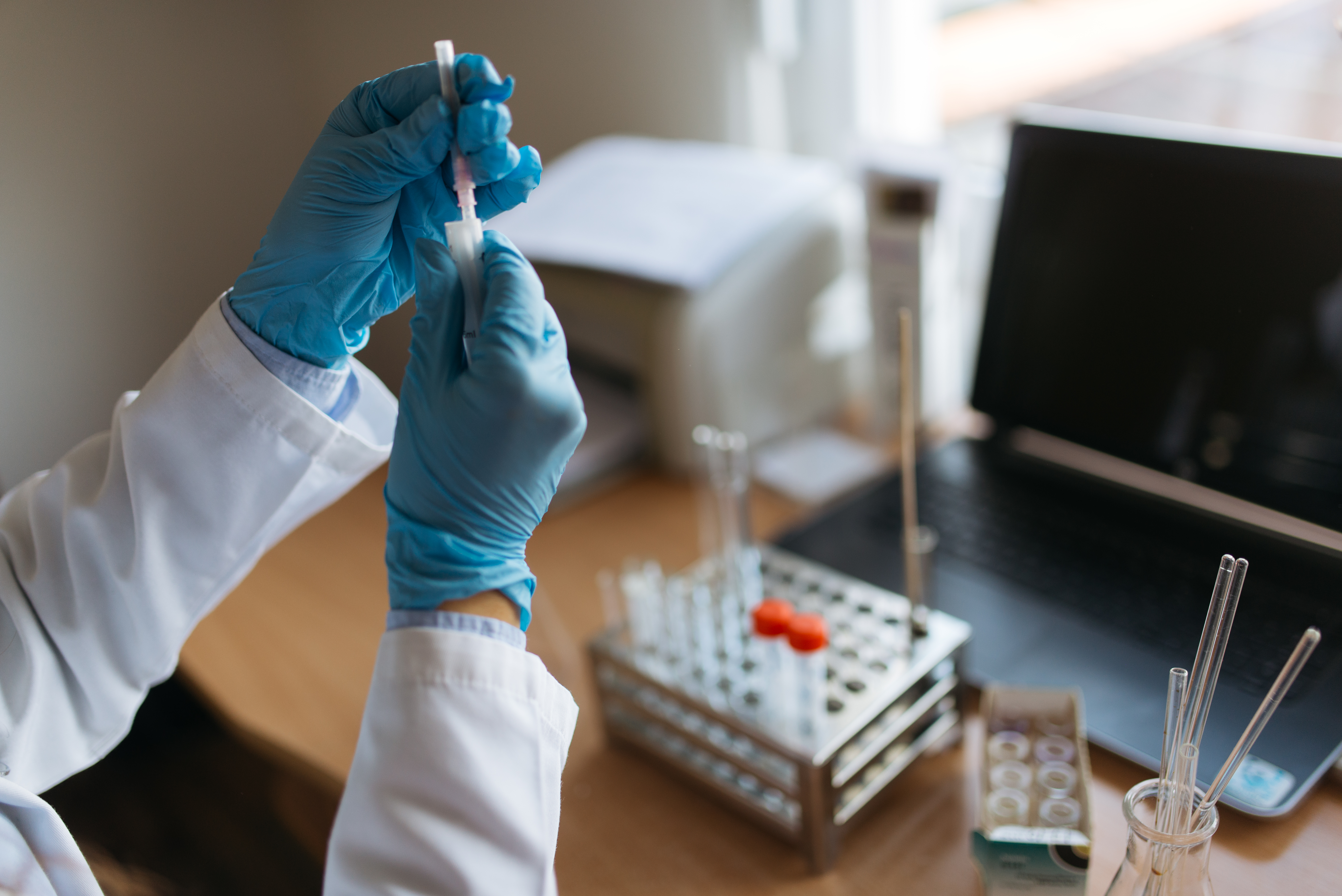
Testing a vaccine in a laboratory

An inverse vaccine, reverse vaccine, or tolerogenic vaccine, (Note: tolerogenic means tolerance-inducing) is a hypothetical approach to the use of vaccines that trains the immune system to not respond to certain substances. Under laboratory conditions, an inverse vaccine has been shown to combat autoimmune diseases. An autoimmune disease attacks the body's own cells and substances, an inverse vaccine must counteract this. The current method of combating the effects of an autoimmune disease is to suppress the entire immune system, which means that infections cannot be fought.

== Approaches ==
As of 2010, human trials were underway using naked DNA that encoded specific antigens of interests, particularly for multiple sclerosis using BHT-3009, and type 1 diabetes mellitus.

== Possible applications ==
Possible applications of inverse vaccines include:

- Multiple Sclerosis (MS)
- Type 1 diabetes
- Psoriasis
- Coeliac disease
- Allergic asthma
- Food allergies
- Chronic inflammatory diseases, such as Crohn's disease
- Preventing an immune response after an organ transplant
- Rheumatoid arthritis

As of 2024, a study is underway into the safety of an inverse vaccine against multiple sclerosis, with a small group of patients and volunteers; for an inverse vaccine against celiac disease, a study into safety and efficacy was conducted in a limited group of subjects with good results, but the company that conducted the study went bankrupt in 2025.

== See also ==
- Allergen immunotherapy, an analogous technique for the treatment of allergy
