= Calixcoca =

Experimental vaccine for drug addiction

Calixcoca is an experimental vaccine to treat cocaine and crack cocaine addiction. It has been in development since 2015 by the Federal University of Minas Gerais (UFMG) in Brazil.

== Development ==
The vaccine was created by a team led by Frederico Garcia, professor in the Department of Mental Health at the UFMG Faculty of Medicine. He says that the motivation for the work came from seeing the suffering of pregnant women addicted to cocaine who arrived at the university's outpatient clinic. The active ingredient of the vaccine (V4N2) was designed and synthesized by the synthesis group headed by professor Ângelo de Fátima, from the Department of Chemistry at UFMG.

During the pre-clinical phase, the investment was made by the National Council for Scientific and Technological Development (CNPq) and the Minas Gerais Research Support Foundation (Fapemig).

On June 1, 2023, the city of São Paulo announced the initial investment of R$4 million in accelerating vaccine research.

== Vaccine ==
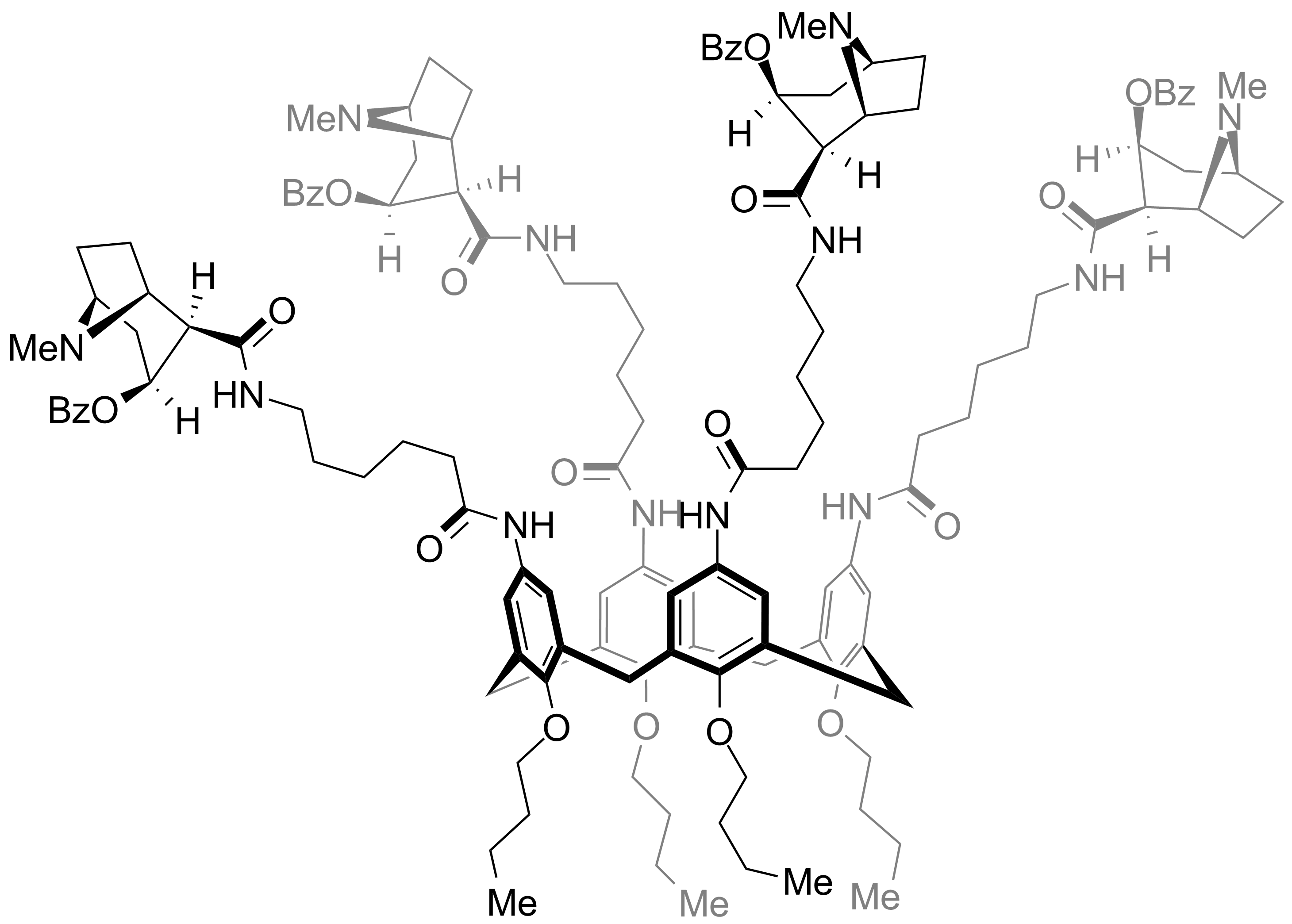
Chemical structure of V4N2, the immunogenic component of the vaccine

Calixcoca, unlike other anti-cocaine vaccines, is not protein-based. The material that forms the basis of the vaccine is the V4N2 molecule. This molecule stimulates the immune system to produce antibodies that bind to cocaine molecules in the blood. Cocaine molecules that are bound to these antibodies are too large to pass the blood-brain barrier and thus cannot reach the brain and cannot cause psychological effects in the user.

== Preclinical studies ==
Pre-clinical studies carried out with mice showed the production of anti-cocaine antibodies in the animals' organism. In addition to making the effects of the drug imperceptible to the mice, the vaccine also reduced the number of spontaneous abortions, and the pups were born healthier and with greater resistance to the drug.

== Awards ==
Calixcoca was selected as one of the finalists in the Euro Health Innovation Award (2023), winning the award in October of that year.
