= AXA1125 =

Experimental drug

Combination of
- Leucine: Amino acid
- Isoleucine: Amino acid
- Valine: Amino acid
- Arginine: Amino acid
- Glutamine: Amino acid
- N-Acetylcysteine: Amino acid derivative

Clinical data
- Other names: LIVRQNac

Chemical and physical data
- 3D model (JSmol): Interactive image
- SMILES: N[C@@]([H])(CC(C)C)C(=O)N[C@@]([H])([C@]([H])(CC)C)C(=O)N[C@@]([H])(C(C)C)C(=O)N[C@@]([H])(CCCNC(=N)N)C(=O)N[C@@]([H])(CCC(=O)N)C(=O)N(C(=O)C)[C@@]([H])(CS)C(=O)O
- InChI: InChI=1S/C33H60N10O9S/c1-8-18(6)26(42-27(46)20(34)14-16(2)3)30(49)41-25(17(4)5)29(48)39-21(10-9-13-38-33(36)37)28(47)40-22(11-12-24(35)45)31(50)43(19(7)44)23(15-53)32(51)52/h16-18,20-23,25-26,53H,8-15,34H2,1-7H3,(H2,35,45)(H,39,48)(H,40,47)(H,41,49)(H,42,46)(H,51,52)(H4,36,37,38)/t18-,20-,21-,22-,23-,25-,26-/m0/s1; Key:NFSGAYYZQFGPLX-LVYWIKMTSA-N

AXA1125 is an experimental drug developed by Axcella Health that "increased β-oxidation and improved bioenergetics in preclinical models". It was studied as a treatment for non-alcoholic fatty liver disease and long COVID.

AXA1125 is a fixed composition comprising five amino acids (leucine, isoleucine, valine, arginine, and glutamine) and an amino acid derivative (N-acetylcysteine).
