= 2023 in climate change =

This article documents events, research findings, scientific and technological advances, and human actions to measure, predict, mitigate, and adapt to the effects of global warming and climate change—during the year 2023.

== Summaries ==
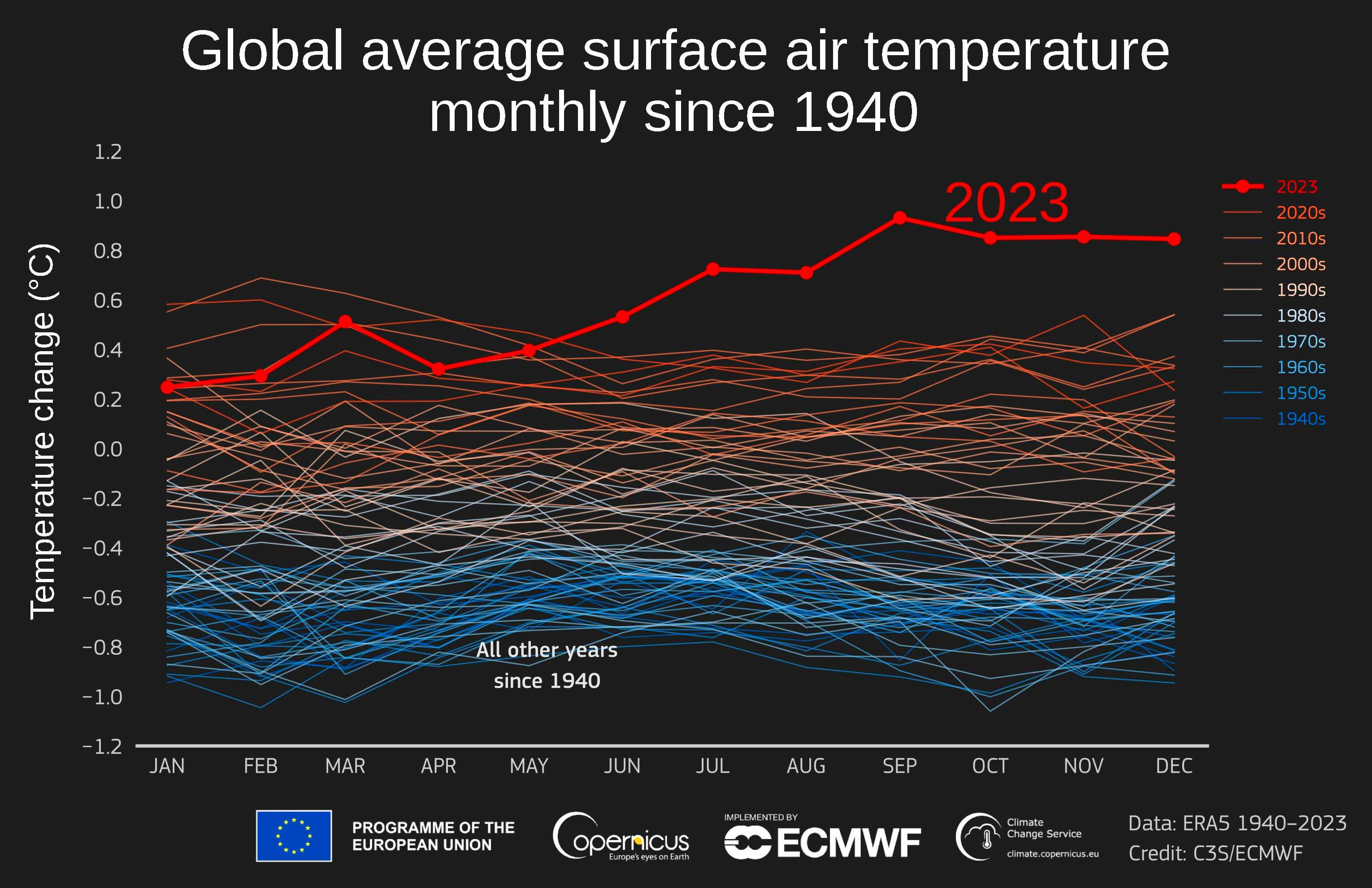
2023 saw the highest global average surface temperature in recorded history.

Global boiling has arrived

Climate change is here. It is terrifying. And it is just the beginning. The era of global warming has ended; the era of global boiling has arrived.

— António Guterres, UN Secretary-General
27 July 2023
2023–2024 as a turning point

When our children and grandchildren look back at the history of human-made climate change, this year [2023] and next will be seen as the turning point at which the futility of governments in dealing with climate change was finally exposed.

— James Hansen, December 2023
Director (1981–2013) of NASA's
Goddard Institute for Space Studies

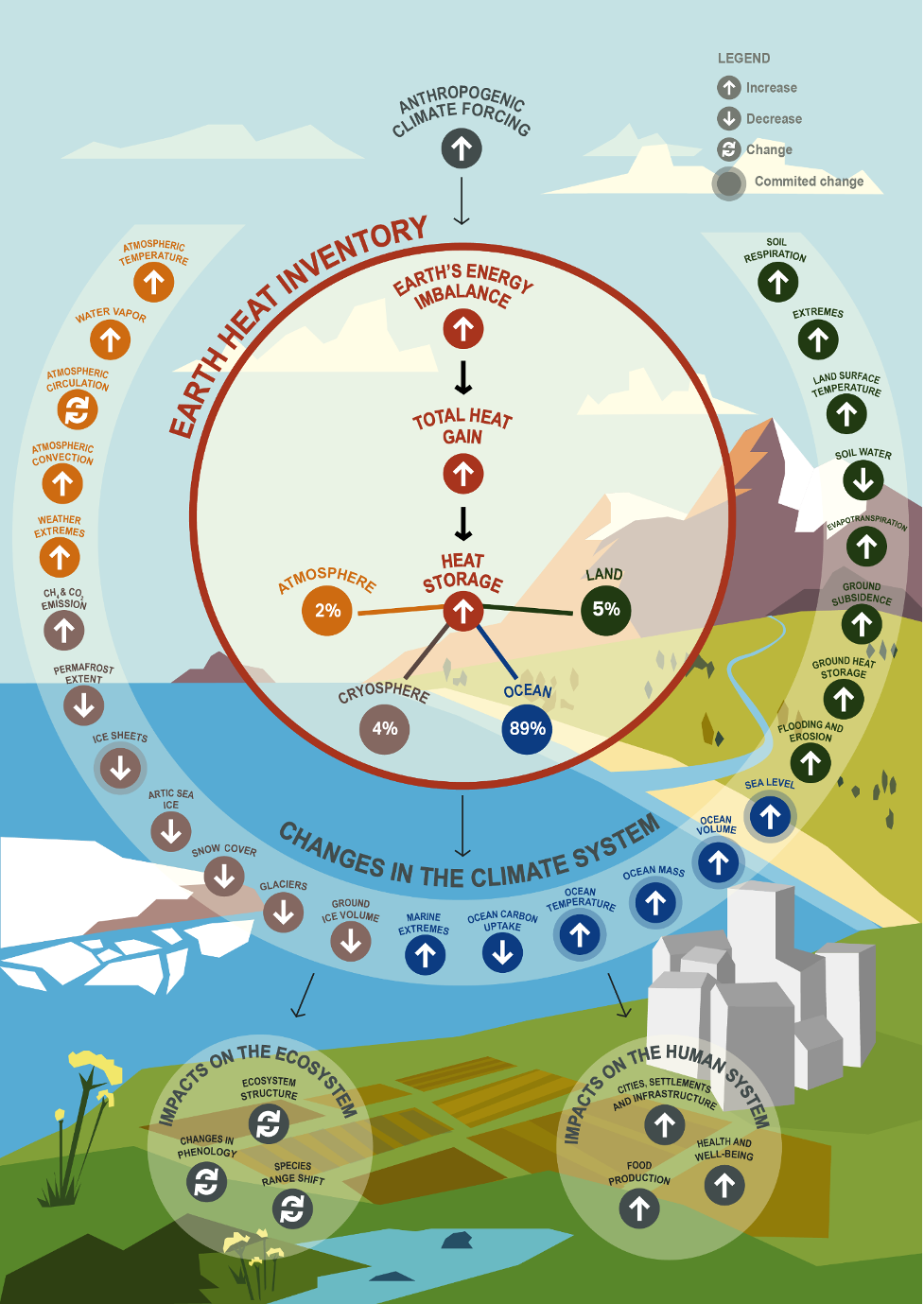
Schematic overview on the central role of the Earth heat inventory and its linkages

- 6 February: U.N. Secretary-General António Guterres said "I have a special message for fossil fuel producers and their enablers scrambling to expand production and raking in monster profits: If you cannot set a credible course for net-zero, with 2025 and 2030 targets covering all your operations, you should not be in business."
- 20 March – The final synthesis of the IPCC Sixth Assessment Report is published. It summarises the state of knowledge relating to climate change with assessed levels of confidence. Conclusions in the summary for contemporary policy-makers include that the extent to which both current and future generations will be impacted depends on choices now and in the near-term, with "high confidence" that policies implemented by the end of 2020 are "projected to result in higher global GHG emissions in 2030 than emissions implied by NDCs" and would fail to meet global climate goals.
- 6 September: U.N. Secretary-General António Guterres said "Our planet has just endured a season of simmering — the hottest summer on record. Climate breakdown has begun."
- 24 October: BioScience's "2023 state of the climate report" stated that "we must shift our perspective on the climate emergency from being just an isolated environmental issue to a systemic, existential threat".
- 27 December: Inside Climate News summarized the year: "The push and pull of progress and catastrophe made 2023 one of the most discordant—and consequential—years for the world's climate. ... In 2023, clean energy progress and the horrors of a radically warming climate fought almost to a draw."

== Measurements and statistics ==
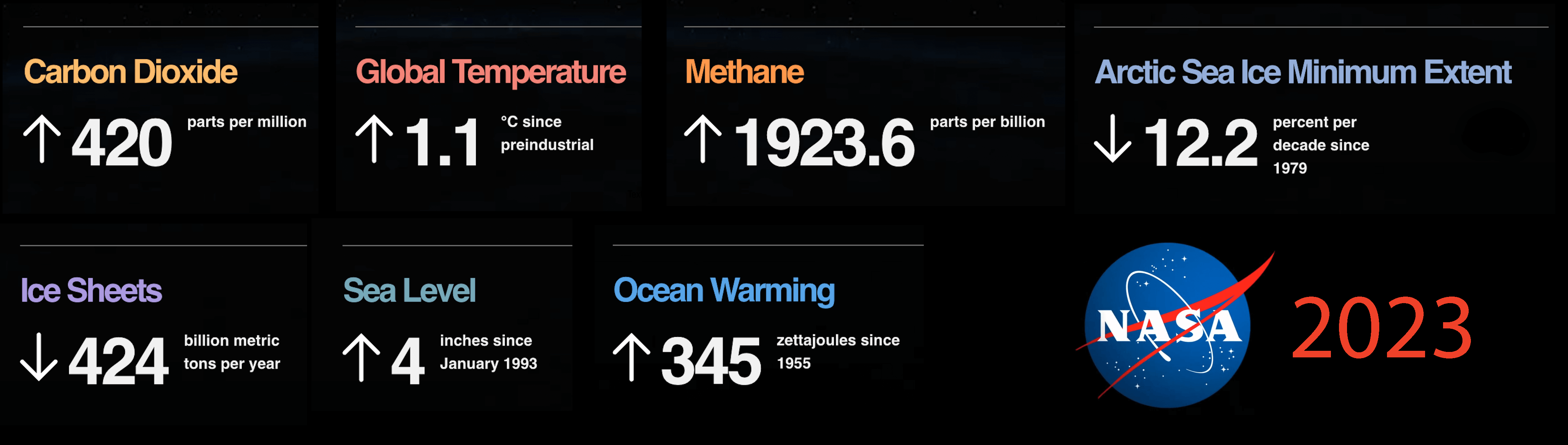
"Vital Signs of the Planet" as presented by NASA on 31 December 2023
- 3 January: the National Snow and Ice Data Center reported that Antarctic sea ice extent stood at the lowest in the 45-year satellite record—more than 500,000 square kilometers (193,000 square miles) below the previous record (2018), with four of the five lowest years for the last half of December having occurred since 2016.
- 26 January: Bloomberg NEF's "Energy Transition Investment Trends" report estimated that, for the first time, energy transition investment matched global fossil fuel investment—$1.1 trillion in 2022, including China with $546 billion, the US with $141 billion, and the EU if treated as a bloc, $180 billion.
- 3 April: An unexplained rise of emissions of five chlorofluorocarbons (CFCs), successfully banned by the Montreal Protocol of 1989, is reported in Nature Geoscience. Their climate impact in 2020 is roughly equivalent to that of the CO_{2}e from Denmark in 2018.
- Reported 10 May: Drax Electric Insights reported that in the first three months of 2023, Britain's wind turbines generated more electricity (32.4%) than gas-fired power stations (31.7%) for the first time.
- 18 May: a study published in Science reported that more than 50% of freshwater lakes and reservoirs lost volume from 1992 to 2020.

2023's June–July–August season was, to date, the warmest on record globally by a large margin, as El Niño conditions continued to develop.

September 2023 was, to date, the warmest September on record globally, with an average surface air temperature substantially above the temperature of the previous warmest September (2020).

- 31 May: an international study in Nature, using modelling and literature assessment, codifies, integrates into and quantifies "safe and just Earth system boundaries" (ESBs) with the context of Earth system stability and minimization of human harm. They expand upon earlier boundary frameworks by incorporating concepts such as intra- and intergenerational justice, propose that their framework may better enable a quantitative foundation for safeguarding the global commons, and report many of the ESBs are already exceeded.
- 15 June: the Copernicus Climate Change Service said that for 11 days, global surface air temperatures had risen to 1.5 °C (34.7 °F) above pre-industrial levels for the first time—the limit aspired to in the 2015 Paris Agreement—the rise occurring near the beginning of an El Niño warming phase.
- 24 July: the National Data Buoy Center recorded an unprecedented temperature of 101.1 °F (38.4 °C) at a depth of 5 feet (1.5 m) in Florida Bay, Florida, US, raising concerns about catastrophic coral bleaching.
- 8 August: in coastal Iran, the heat index reached 70 °C (158 °F).
- 29 August: an International Renewable Energy Agency (IRENA) publication stated that ~86% (187 GW) of renewable capacity added in 2022 had lower costs than electricity generated from fossil fuels.
- 31 August: an article in Geophysical Research Letters reported a March 2022 "unprecedented heatwave" in the Antarctic reaching 39 °C (70 °F) above average—the largest temperature anomaly ever recorded globally—attributed 2 °C of the increase to global warming, and projected possible heatwaves of an additional 5–6 °C (9.0–10.8 °F) warmer by 2100.
- 29 September: a study published in Nature Communications estimated the global costs of extreme weather attributable to climate change in the last twenty years to be US$143 billion per year, 63% of which is due to human loss of life.
- 19 October: a study published in Scientific Reports said that the number of North Atlantic tropical cyclones that intensify from a Category 1 into a major hurricane within 36 hours, has more than doubled from 1971–1990 to 2001–2020.
- 20 November: the Copernicus European Centre for Medium-Range Weather Forecasts reported that 17 November was the first day that the global average surface temperature exceeded pre-industrial levels by more than 2 °C.
- 29 November: a study published in The BMJ concluded that about 5.13 million excess deaths per year globally are attributable to ambient air pollution from fossil fuel use.

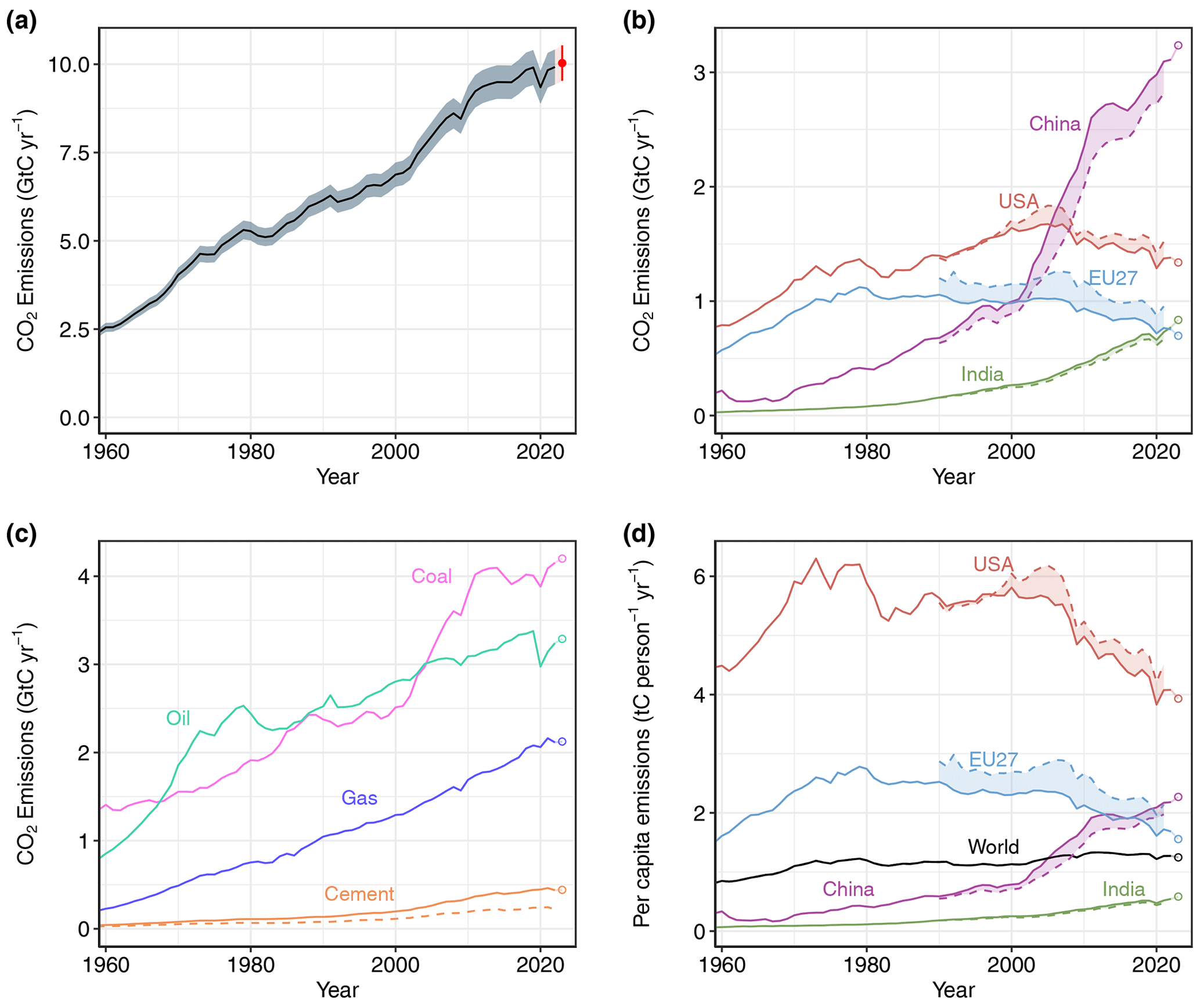
Fossil CO_{2} emissions by source of continued CO_{2} rise

- 5 December: the annual Global Carbon Budget study finds fossil CO_{2} emissions are still rising when if they stayed the same, the 50% likelihood to limit global warming to 1.5 °C would be exceeded around 2031.
- 8 May 2024 (reported): Ember reported that for the first time, renewable energy generated a 30% of global electricity in 2023.
- 28 August 2024: a study published in the journal Nature concluded that the June–September 2023 Canadian wildfires caused carbon emissions that exceeded annual fossil fuel emissions of all nations except India, China and the US.
- 10 September 2025: a study published in Nature attributed 3,400–7,400 acute deaths in North America and 37,800–90,900 chronic deaths in North America and Europe to PM_{2.5} (fine particulate matter) exposure from the 2023 Canadian wildfires.

== Natural events and phenomena ==
The extent (area) of Antarctic sea ice reached a new low in 2023. Chart shows how little sea ice remains in the Antarctic summer, which at one point in February 2023 was only about 60% of its 1981–2010 average.

- 7 February: a study published in Nature Communications concluded that 15 million people globally are exposed to impacts from potential glacial lake outburst floods (GLOFs), more than half being from India, Pakistan, Peru, and China. Climate change has intensified glacial ice melt and expanded glacial lakes.
- 13 February: a study published in the Proceedings of the National Academy of Sciences reported that increasing abundance of a thermotolerant symbiotic alga hosted by corals has facilitated maintenance of high coral cover after three mass coral bleaching events, suggesting that future reefs might maintain high cover for several decades, albeit with low diversity and provided that other stressors are minimized.
- 15 February: studies by the British Antarctic Survey and the US Antarctic Program found that glaciers on Antarctica may be more sensitive to changes in ocean temperature than previously thought. Researchers used sensors and an underwater robot beneath the Thwaites Glacier to study melting. One day earlier, a new record low Antarctic sea ice extent was reported by the National Snow and Ice Data Center.
- 2 March: a study published in Science said that boreal fires, typically accounting for 10% of global fire CO_{2} emissions, contributed 23% in 2021, by far the highest fraction since 2000. 2021 was an abnormal year because North American and Eurasian boreal forests synchronously experienced their greatest water deficit.
- 13 March: a study published in Nature Water found that total intensity of extreme events (droughts and pluvials (rainfall events)) is strongly correlated with global mean temperature, and concluded that continued warming of the planet will cause more frequent, more severe, longer and/or larger of such extreme events, and that "distortion of the water cycle... will be among the most conspicuous consequences of climate change".
- 29 March: a study published in Nature concluded that under a high-emissions scenario, abyssal warming is set to accelerate over the next 30 years, and that meltwater input around Antarctica drives a contraction of Antarctic Bottom Water (AABW), opening a pathway that allows warm circumpolar deep water greater access to the continental shelf and results in warming and aging of the abyssal ocean. The study described the "critical importance of Antarctic meltwater in setting the abyssal ocean overturning, with implications for global ocean biogeochemistry and climate that could last for centuries". On 25 May, observational evidence for problematic fast slowdown of the Antarctic bottom water current is presented in Nature Climate Change.
- 7 April: citing reduced air density caused by global warming, a study published in the Bulletin of the American Meteorological Society estimated global warming has enabled more than 500 excess home runs in Major League Baseball since 2010, and projected hundreds more in this century, explaining that "even the elite billion-dollar sports industry is vulnerable to unexpected impacts" of global warming.
- 5 June: a study published in Current Biology estimated that fungi can fix (remove from the atmosphere) the equivalent of ~36% of global fossil fuel Greenhouse gas emissions.
- 8 June: NOAA published an "ENSO update" declaring that "El Niño is here", estimating the odds of it becoming a strong event (56%), at least a moderate event (84%), and "fizzling out" (4-7%).

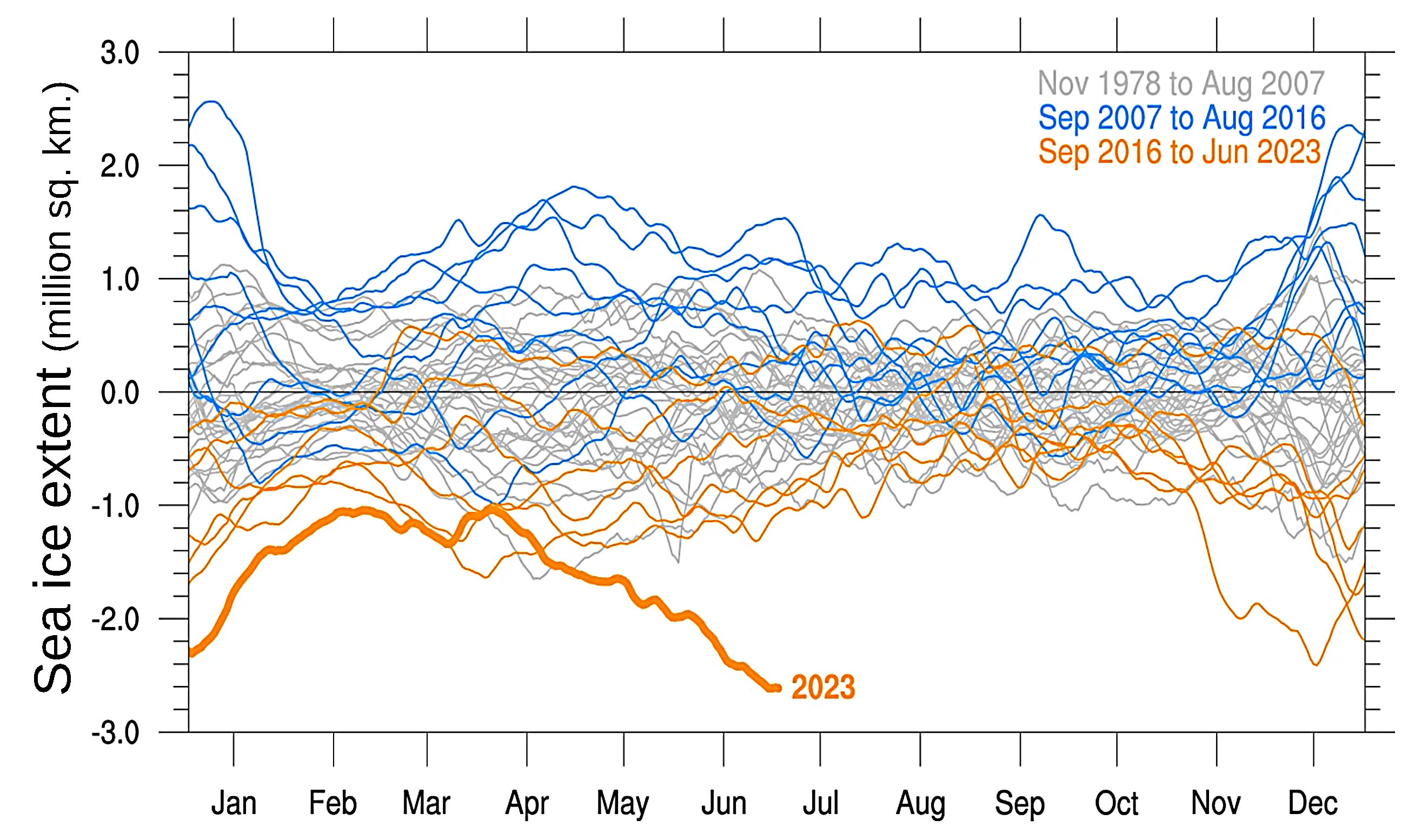
Reporting on the reduced Antarctic sea ice extent in mid 2023, researchers concluded that a "regime shift" may be taking place "in which previously important relationships no longer dominate sea ice variability".

The area burned by the 2023 Canadian wildfires was more than twice that of any prior year of record.

A study published in June 2024 concluded that the frequency and intensity of extreme fire events more than doubled from 2003 to 2023.

- 11 June: Fluchthorn, a mountain between Switzerland and Austria, experienced a landslide of 3.5 million ft^{3} (99,000 m^{3}) and a loss of 60 feet (18 m) in height, that has been attributed to melting of permafrost.
- 20 June (reported): the Panama Canal is experiencing its lowest rainfall since inception, lowering water levels and requiring restrictions for some vessels to limit their cargo by about 25% to maintain a safe draft and avoid running aground.
- 4 July: the WMO formally declared "onset of El Niño conditions", projecting it to be "at least of moderate strength".
- 11 July: a study of Chicago structures published in Communications Engineering found that in urban settings, subsurface heat islands caused by global warming cause significant deformations and displacements that may be "incompatible with the operational requirements of civil structures".
- 28 July: Yale Environment 360 reported that, adding to ongoing climate change's dominant warming influence, additional factors contributing to current temperature increases include: (1) 2022 eruption of an underwater volcano near Tonga, vaporizing large amounts of sea water and contributing an estimated 0.03 °C (0.054 °F) of warming, (2) solar radiance increasing towards its ~2025 11-year peak when it may contribute 0.05 °C (0.090 °F) of warming, and (3) the Pacific Ocean entering its El Niño phase, projected to contribute 0.14 °C (0.25 °F) of warming.
- 23 August (reported): the Panama Canal experienced an unprecedented dry season causing a decline in water levels and prompting canal administrators to limit daily vessel passages from 36 to 32, and forcing some ships to carry up to 40% less cargo to avoid hitting the bottom.
- 24 August: a study published in Nature Communications concluded that tropical cyclone rapid intensification (RI) events in offshore areas within 400 kilometres (250 mi) of coastlines, tripled in frequency from 1980 to 2020.
- 8 September (date of report): for the first time in recorded history, all seven tropical ocean basins saw cyclones/hurricanes reach Category 5 strength in the same year.
- 13 September: a study published in Communications Earth & Environment concluded that, while for many years Antarctic sea ice had increased, from recent record lows in Antarctic sea ice coverage "it appears that we may now be seeing the inevitable decline, long projected by climate models", and that a "regime shift" may be taking place "in which previously important relationships no longer dominate sea ice variability".
- 13 September: a study published in Science Advances indicated that six of the nine "planetary boundaries"—delimiting the "safe operating space"—had been exceeded. Carbon dioxide concentration and radiative forcing were among the boundaries that had been exceeded.
- 27 September: studying tropical cyclones from 1981 to 2017, a study published in Nature found that cyclones formed almost two weeks sooner, on average, which authors said was "closely related to the seasonal advance of rapid intensification events". The time advance shifts cyclones from autumn into summer, increasing overlap with the peak rainfall season.
- 6 December: a study published in Nature Geoscience said that marine methane hydrate—an ice-like substance found in sediment beneath water depths greater than ~450–700 m—can vent into the ocean to such a degree that it should considered for estimating climate change-induced release of methane, a greenhouse gas.

== Actions and goal statements ==
=== Science and technology ===
- 8 February: Scientists in the U.S. propose mining the lunar soil and launching it towards the Sun to form a shield (space sunshade) against global warming.
- 3 March: After a study (31 Jan) indicated that in building heating in the EU, the feasibility of staying within planetary boundaries is possible only through electrification, with green hydrogen heating being 2–3 times more expensive than heat pump costs, a study indicates that replacing gas boilers with heat pumps is the fastest way to cut German gas consumption.
- 17 April – A study in Earth System Science Data expands upon the international Earth heat inventory from 2020, which provides a measure of the Earth energy imbalance (EEI) and allows for quantifying how much and where heat has accumulated in the Earth system with comprehensive data. It suggests that the EEI is the "most fundamental global climate indicator" to gauge climate change mitigation efforts.
- 8 May: a study published in the Proceedings of the National Academy of Sciences concluded that studies extending the reach of "vertical fingerprinting" to the mid to upper stratosphere provide "incontrovertible evidence of anthropogenic impact on Earth's climate".
- 3 August (reported): floating, vertical-axis wind turbines with a "twirling" operation generate power regardless of wind direction.
- 17 October: a study published in Nature Communications concluded that, subject to various uncertainties, "a global irreversible solar tipping point may have passed where solar energy gradually comes to dominate global electricity markets, without any further climate policies".

=== Political, economic, legal, and cultural actions ===
Phasedown of fossil fuels

The phasedown of fossil fuels is inevitable. The speed at which this happens depends on how quickly we can phase up zero carbon alternatives, while ensuring energy security, accessibility and affordability.

— Sultan Ahmed al-Jaber, COP28 President

and CEO of Abu Dhabi National Oil Company

June 2023
- 1 January: Extinction Rebellion made a statement that for 2023 it had made "a controversial resolution to temporarily shift away from public disruption as a primary tactic", after 2022's traffic blockages and throwing soup on the case of Vincent van Gogh's "Sunflowers" painting.
- 5 January: A paywalled meta-analysis in Nature Climate Change reports "required technology-level investment shifts for climate-relevant infrastructure until 2035" within the EU, which it finds to be "most drastic for power plants, electricity grids and rail infrastructure", ~€87 billion above the planned budgets and in need of sustainable finance policies.
- 11 January: the French National Assembly adopted the Acceleration of Renewable Energies bill, which includes a requirement to install solar panels on all car parks (parking lots) of over 1,500 square metres (16,100 square feet).
- 12 January: A study in Environmental Research Letters suggests that applying the principle of extended producer responsibility to fossil fuels could deconflict energy security and climate policy at an affordable cost, in particular authors suggest the responsibility could be used to establish the financing of CO_{2} storage and nature-based solutions.
- 25 January: A paper in Harvard Environmental Law Review suggests that according to already-existing law fossil fuel companies may be chargeable with homicide due to climate change effects and e.g. partly their deception of the public and proactive prevention of regulations or adequate regulations. The paper is focused on corporate actors and does not address e.g. politicians' and policymakers' responsibilities, economic pressures or incentives, and responsibilities for solutions to these underlying economic issues.
- 14 February: the European Parliament effectively banned sale of new petrol and diesel cars in the European Union from 2035, and set a 55% cut over 2021 CO_{2} emission levels for new cars sold from 2030.
- 19 February: A study in Ethics, Policy & Environment reports that rationing has been neglected as a policy option for mitigating climate change, and, partly based on historical data and economic analysis, concludes that such personal carbon allowances (PCAs) could help states reduce emissions rapidly and fairly.
- March: the UN 2023 Water Conference was held in New York.
- 21 April: a review study published in One Earth stated that opinion polls show that most people perceive climate change as occurring now and close by. The study concluded that seeing climate change as more distant does not necessarily result in less climate action, and reducing psychological distancing does not reliably increase climate action.
- 21 April: the Director General of the United Nations' International Organization for Migration said that there are more people displaced because of climate change than because of conflicts, explaining that climate change and conflict interact as triggers of displacement.
- 24 April: A policy study in Nature Communications identifies reduction of car travel activity as the most important transportation policy option in reducing GHG emissions to levels comparable to carbon budget levels, with a "decrease car distance driven and car ownership by over 80% as compared to current levels" by 2027 being effective in "edging close to the designated carbon budget" in their case-study of London and electrification being highly insufficient.
Joint action is essential for planetary and human health

Over 200 health journals call on the United Nations, political leaders, and health professionals to recognise that climate change and biodiversity loss are one indivisible crisis and must be tackled together to preserve health and avoid catastrophe. This overall environmental crisis is now so severe as to be a global health emergency.

— The BMJ medical journal
October 2023
- 19 May: a study published in One Earth estimated that the top 21 fossil fuel companies will owe cumulative climate reparations of $5.4 trillion over the period 2025–2050.
- 12 June: the trial phase of Held v. Montana, the first constitutional climate trial in US, began in the U.S. state of Montana. Sixteen young residents filed the suit based on the state's 1972 constitution requiring that the "state and each person shall maintain and improve a clean and healthful environment in Montana for present and future generations". On August 14, 2023, the trial court judge ruled in the youth plaintiffs' favor, though the state indicated it would appeal the decision.
- 23 June: a global summit on finance and climate ended in Paris without creating a tax on greenhouse gas emissions from maritime transport, or fulfilling promises to transfer money to poor countries through the International Monetary Fund.
- 11 July: A study suggests in One Earth that carbon taxation approaches or instruments would be more effective and fairer when distinguishing between luxury- and basic goods and services. A separate study (17 July) in Nature Energy finds that for energy demand reduction (EDR), "capping energy use of the top quintile of consumers" would be effective, more equitable, and increase public acceptance of transformative climate action in Europe.
- July: at a meeting in Chennai, India, G20 climate and environment ministers did not come to agreement on four of 68 points considered, including achieving peak emissions by 2025, converting to clean energy, or taxing carbon.
- 14 August: the trial court judge in Held v. Montana ruled in favor of the youth plaintiffs, declaring certain Montana laws violated Montana's state constitution. The judge's 103-page ruling concluded that the "MEPA Limitation violates Youth Plaintiffs' right to a clean and healthful environment and is unconstitutional on its face".
- 17 August: Scientists publish in PLOS Climate what could be the first study both investigating climate-polluting investments and proposing taxation thereof as transformative revenue for climate finance, i.a. indicating "40% of total U.S. emissions were associated with income flows to the highest earning 10% of households" in 2019 with a growing emissions inequality.
- 18 August: A study in One Earth investigating public policies and spending as well as lobbying activities regarding a transition to a sustainable food system finds that governments "largely ignore the climate-mitigation potential of animal product analogs" and that food production has 'lock-in' problems.
2023 U.N. Climate Change Conference (COP28)

The Conference of the Parties... calls on Parties to contribute to the following global efforts:

(a) Tripling renewable energy capacity globally and doubling the global average annual rate of energy efficiency improvements by 2030;
(d) Transitioning away from fossil fuels in energy systems, in a just, orderly and equitable manner, accelerating action in this critical decade, so as to achieve net zero by 2050 in keeping with the science;

— Outcome of the first global stocktake, COP28
13 December 2023
- 24 August: the International Monetary Fund reported that global fossil fuel subsidies in 2022 were $7 trillion ($13 million per minute), amounting to 7.1% of GDP.
- 6 September: the first Africa Climate Summit concluded with the "Nairobi Declaration", in which African leaders requested global taxes on carbon pollution, phasing out coal use, and ending fossil fuel subsidies.
- 6 September: A study in PLOS Climate using a global food system model suggests that net-negative greenhouse gas emissions could be possible in a sustainable food system achievable with full global deployment of diverse interventions, with the most promising options including hydrogen-powered fertilizer production, livestock feeds, organic and inorganic soil amendments, agroforestry, sustainable seafood harvesting practices, and adoption of flexitarian diets.
- 25 October: over 200 health journals called on the World Health Organization to declare the "indivisible climate and nature crisis" a global health emergency, saying that treating the climate crisis and the nature crisis as separate challenges is "a dangerous mistake".
- 30 November − 12 December: the 2023 United Nations Climate Change Conference (COP28) convened in Dubai, United Arab Emirates. Controversial because Emirati oil executive Sultan Al Jaber presided over the conference and because of the presence of record numbers of fossil fuel lobbyists, COP28 was the first COP to explicitly call on participants to "transition away from fossil fuels" so as to achieve net zero emissions by 2050, though not adopting calls for a "complete phase-out" of fossil fuels.

=== Mitigation goal statements ===
A rapidly narrowing window

Key finding 4: global emissions are not in line with modelled global mitigation pathways consistent with the temperature goal of the Paris Agreement, and there is a rapidly narrowing window to raise ambition and implement existing commitments in order to limit warming to 1.5 °C above pre-industrial levels.

— U.N. Framework Convention on Climate Change
8 September 2023
- 15 April: a communique from a meeting of G7 ministers pledged to collectively increase offshore wind capacity by 150 gigawatts by 2030 and solar capacity to more than 1 terawatt, and agreed to accelerate the phase-out of unabated (without recapture) fossil fuels to achieve net zero by 2050. They stopped short of endorsing a 2030 deadline for phasing out coal, and left the door open for continued investment in gas to help address potential energy shortfalls.
- 19 May: a policies study review in One Earth, based on a systematic examination of existing methane policies across sectors, concludes that both only "about 13% of methane emissions are covered by methane mitigation policies and that the effectiveness of these policies "is far from clear".

== Consensus ==
- 8 June: a study published in PLOS Climate studied defensive and secure forms of national identity—respectively called "national narcissism" (Note: Cislak et al. define National Narcissism as "a belief that one's national group is exceptional and deserves external recognition underlain by unsatisfied psychological needs".) and "secure national identification" (Note: Cislak et al. define Secure National Identification as "reflect(ing) feelings of strong bonds and solidarity with one's ingroup members, and sense of satisfaction in group membership".)—for their correlation to support for policies to mitigate climate change and to transition to renewable energy. The researchers concluded that secure national identification tends to support policies promoting renewable energy; however, national narcissism was found to be inversely correlated with support for such policies—except to the extent that such policies, as well as greenwashing, enhance the national image. Right-wing political orientation, which may indicate susceptibility to climate conspiracy beliefs, was also concluded to be negatively correlated with support for genuine climate mitigation policies.
- 7 August: A global survey study of climate policy researchers, published in Nature Sustainability, finds these experts substantially doubt the prevailing green growth narrative, "underscor[ing] the importance of considering alternative post-growth perspectives" that include approaches of agrowth and degrowth.

== Projections ==
Projections for different amounts of global warming: Melting of glacial mass, sea level rise, and loss of number of glaciers.

The consequences of (sea level rise) are unthinkable. Low-lying communities and entire countries could disappear forever. We would witness a mass exodus of entire populations on a biblical scale.

— António Guterres, U.N. Secretary-General
14 February 2023
- 2 January: a study published in Earth's Future (American Geophysical Union) concluded that the greatest increase in the amount of coastal area below mean sea level will occur in the early stages of sea level rise (SLR), contrary to earlier assessments, shortening time for adaptation efforts. Latest projections indicate that SLR is certain to exceed 2 metres (6.6 ft) in coming centuries, and a rise by 4 metres (13 ft) is considered possible.
- 5 January: a study published in Science stated that, based on then-current pledges, global mean temperature is projected to increase by +2.7 °C, which would cause loss of about half of Earth's glaciers by 2100, causing a sea level rise of 115±40 millimeters (not counting ice sheet melt).
- 30 January: Climate scientists predict, using artificial intelligence, in Proceedings of the National Academy of Sciences that global warming will exceed 1.5 °C in the next decade (scenario SSP2-4.5), and a nearly 70% chance of 2 °C between 2044 and 2065 (~2054)—a substantial probability of exceeding the 2 °C threshold—even if emissions rapidly decline (scenario SSP1-2.6).
- 30 January: A study in Nature Sustainability outlines challenges of aviation decarbonization by 2050 whose identified factors mainly are future demand, continuous efficiency improvements, new short-haul engines, higher SAF (biofuel) production, CO_{2} removal to compensate for non-CO_{2} forcing, and related policy-options. With constant air transport demand and aircraft efficiency, decarbonizing aviation would require nearly five times the 2019 worldwide biofuel production, competing with other hard-to-decarbonize sectors and land-use (or food security).
- 6 February: A study in Nature Climate Change integrates policy as an aspect into an integrated assessment model, showing that Powering Past Coal Alliance-based (from COP23) coal phase-out is highly unlikely (<5%) with current policies where both coal-use would substantially only shift from power to other industries (steel, cement, and chemicals) and China will now potentially "dangerously delay" the phase-out.
- February: the International Energy Agency's Electricity Market Report 2023 projected that low-emissions sources will constitute almost all the growth in global electricity demand through 2025, with renewables' portion of global power generation rising from 29% in 2022 to 35% in 2025.
- 6 March: The highest-granularity study on food GHGs, published in Nature Climate Change, reports that global food consumption alone would lead to failed climate goals with constant patterns, with ~75% of the projected warming due to ruminant meat, dairy and rice, albeit consumption currently shifts towards higher emissions overall as economic development is expected to facilitate acquisitions of undifferentiated goods like beef.
- 13 March: a study published in Nature Sustainability forecast that floating photovoltaic (FPV) systems on reservoirs could provide 9,434±29 terawatt-hours/year—over a third of global electricity.
- 27 March: a study in Geophysical Research Letters attempts to provide estimations of the tipping point(s) of the Greenland ice sheet.
- 5 April: in its Boom and Bust Coal publication, Global Energy Monitor stated that phasing out operating coal power by 2040 would require an average of 117 GW of retirements per year—4.5 times the capacity retired in 2022. An average of 60 GW/yr for OECD countries, and 91 GW/year for non-OECD countries, must come offline.
- 17 May: the WMO Global Annual to Decadal Climate Update projected that the chance of global near-surface temperature exceeding 1.5 °C above preindustrial levels for at least one year between 2023 and 2027 is 66%, though it is unlikely (32%) that the five-year mean will exceed 1.5 °C.
Energy transition gathers pace

The adoption of tighter efficiency standards by regulators, structural changes to the economy and the ever-accelerating penetration of EVs are expected to powerfully moderate annual growth in oil demand throughout the (2023–2028) forecast.

— International Energy Agency (IEA)
14 June 2023
- 20 May: a study published in One Earth found that increased temperature delays sleep onset and increases the probability of insufficient sleep, estimating that global warming may erode 50–58 hours of sleep per person-year while producing geographic inequalities that scale with future emissions.

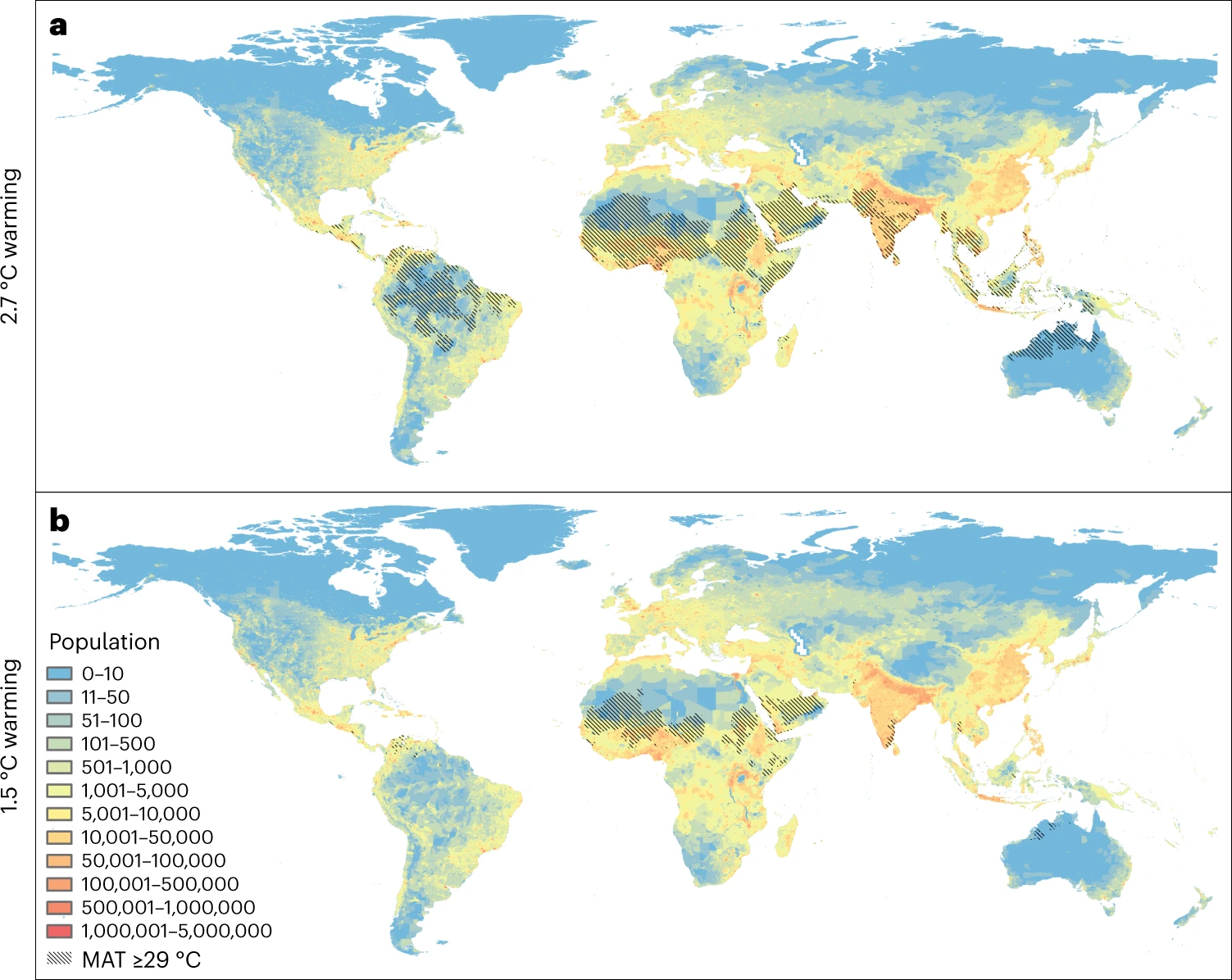
Regions and population densities exposed to unprecedented heat at different levels of global warming.

- 22 May: a study published in Nature Sustainability projected that current policies leading to ~2.7 °C global warming could leave 22–39% of humans outside their "human climate niche"—defined as "the historically highly conserved distribution of relative human population density with respect to mean annual temperature." The study projected that reducing warming from 2.7 to 1.5 °C would result in a ~5-fold decrease in population exposed to unprecedented heat.
- 6 June: a study published in Nature Communications projected that under all SSP emissions scenarios considered, the Arctic would be ice-free in September as soon as the 2030s, sooner than the IPCC's earlier projection of mid-century.
- 7 June: the American Lung Association projected that, by 2050, as the U.S. moves to 100 percent zero emission new passenger vehicles sales and clean electricity generation, the resulting cleaner air could bring $978 billion in public health benefits, 89,300 fewer premature deaths, 2.2 million fewer asthma attacks, and 10.7 million fewer lost workdays.
- 14 June: the International Energy Agency's Oil 2023: Analysis and forecast to 2028 said that demand for oil from combustible fossil fuels is on course to peak in 2028 (the final year of the forecast), and that growth is set to reverse after 2023 for gasoline and after 2026 for transport fuels overall.
- 25 July: a study published in Nature Communications projected a tipping point collapse of the Atlantic meridional overturning circulation (AMOC) by mid-century, causing long term cooling of Europe. Earlier IPCC projections were that such a collapse is not likely within the century.
- 19 August: a study published in Energies projected that global warming reaching 2 °C this century will cause premature deaths in roughly 1 billion humans. The study cited the order-of-magnitude estimate in the "1000-ton rule" that states that a future person is killed every time 1,000 tons of fossil carbon are burned.
- 28 August: a study published in Nature Climate Change projected that without snowmaking, 53% of ski resorts in 28 European countries will be at "very high risk for snow supply" under global warming of 2 °C (98% under 4 °C warming).
- 5 September: A study in The Lancet Planetary Health shows decoupling rates in high-income countries are inadequate for Paris Agreement commitments and suggests post-growth approaches such as demand reduction strategies and reorienting the economy.
- 2 October: a study published in Nature Communications studied the effect of the expected reduction in the amount of dark-colored, light-absorbing atmospheric particles (LAPs) that snow would absorb, making the snow reflect more sunlight, thus reducing radiative forcing that would otherwise warm the Earth. The study concluded that there would be a reduction in radiative forcing from 0.65 W/m^{2} (1995–2014) to 0.49 W/m^{2} (in 2081–2100).
- 23 October: a Washington Post analysis concluded that by 2040, longer warm and moist transmission seasons and expanding habitats for mosquitos (both caused by climate change), coupled with expected demographic growth, could put more than 5 billion people at risk of contracting malaria.
- 23 October: a study published in Nature Climate Change projected that ocean warming at about triple the historical rate is likely unavoidable in the 21st century, with no significant difference between mid-range emissions scenarios versus achieving the most ambitious targets of the Paris Agreement—suggesting that greenhouse gas mitigation has limited ability to prevent collapse of the West Antarctic Ice Sheet.
- 24 October: the International Energy Agency's World Energy Outlook 2023 stated that "the momentum behind clean energy transitions is now sufficient for global demand for coal, oil and natural gas to all reach a high point before 2030 in the STEPS" (Stated Policies Scenario).
- 2 November: a study published in Oxford Open Climate Change (co-author: James E. Hansen) projected that the recent decline of aerosol emissions should increase the global warming rate of 0.18 °C per decade (1970–2010) to at least 0.27 °C per decade, so that "under the present geopolitical approach to GHG emissions", warming will exceed 1.5 °C in the 2020s and 2 °C before 2050.
- 5 December: a report from the United Nations Environment Programme projected that on current growth trends, electricity for cooling equipment (air conditioning) would more than double by 2050, and that under a business-as-usual scenario, emissions from cooling would account for more than 10% of global emissions in 2050.

== Significant publications ==
Observed Changes and Impacts

Human-caused climate change is already affecting many weather and climate extremes in every region across the globe. This has led to widespread adverse impacts and related losses and damages to nature and people (high confidence). Vulnerable communities who have historically contributed the least to current climate change are disproportionately affected (high confidence).

— "Headline Statement A2" in the AR6 Synthesis Report
Entering uncharted territory

We warn of potential collapse of natural and socioeconomic systems in such a world where we will face unbearable heat, frequent extreme weather events, food and fresh water shortages, rising seas, more emerging diseases, and increased social unrest and geopolitical conflict.

— 2023 State of the Climate Report
15,000 scientist signatories, 24 October 2023
- February: "Electricity Market Report 2023" (PDF). iea.org. International Energy Agency. February 2023. Archived (PDF) from the original on 9 February 2023.
- 22 March: "AR6 Synthesis Report / Headline Statements". IPCC.ch. Intergovernmental Panel on Climate Change. March 2023. Archived from the original on 22 March 2023.
- 22 March: "Longer Report of the Synthesis Report of the IPCC Six Assessment Report (AR6)" (PDF). IPCC.ch. Intergovernmental Panel on Climate Change. March 2023. Archived (PDF) from the original on 22 March 2023.
- 23 March: Gilmore, Anna B; et al. (April 2023). "Defining and conceptualising the commercial determinants of health". The Lancet. 401 (10383): 1194–1213. doi:10.1016/s0140-6736(23)00013-2. hdl:1893/35148. ISSN 0140-6736. PMID 36966782. S2CID 257698115.
- 21 April: "State of the Global Climate 2022". WMO.int. World Meteorological Organization (WMO). 21 April 2023. Archived from the original on 21 April 2023.
- 17 May: "WMO Global Annual to Decadal Climate Update". World Meteorological Organization. 17 May 2023. Archived from the original on 17 May 2023.
- 22 August: Committee on the Rights of the Child (22 August 2023). "Convention on the Rights of the Child / General comment No. 26 (2023) on children's rights and the environment, with a special focus on climate change". United Nations Commission on Human Rights. Archived from the original on 29 August 2023.
- 4 October: "Apostolic Exhortation / Laudate Deum of the Holy Father Francis to all people of good will on the climate crisis". vatical.va. The Vatican. 4 October 2023. Archived from the original on 26 October 2023.
- 24 October: World Energy Outlook 2023 (PDF). International Energy Agency. 24 October 2023. Archived (PDF) from the original on 26 October 2023.
- 24 October: Ripple, William J.; Wolf, Christopher; Gregg, Jillian W.; Rockström, Johan; et al. (24 October 2023). "The 2023 state of the climate report: Entering uncharted territory". BioScience. biad080 (12): 841–850. doi:10.1093/biosci/biad080.
- 14 November: Fifth National Climate Assessment, U.S. Global Change Research Program. (overview, 47 pp) (Report in Brief, 144pp)
- 30 November: "Provisional State of the Global Climate 2023" (PDF). WMO.int. World Meteorological Organization (WMO). 30 November 2023. Archived (PDF) from the original on 30 November 2023.
- 19 March 2024: "State of the Global Climate 2023". WMO.int. World Meteorological Organization. 19 March 2024. Archived from the original on 19 March 2024. WMO-No. 1347.

== See also ==
- 2023 in the environment
- 2023 in science
- Climatology § History
- Fifth National Climate Assessment (NCA5) 2023
- History of climate change policy and politics
- History of climate change science
- Politics of climate change § History
- Timeline of sustainable energy research 2020 to the present
