= 2023 in the environment =

This is an article of notable issues relating to the terrestrial environment of Earth in 2023. They relate to environmental events such as natural disasters, environmental sciences such as ecology and geoscience with a known relevance to contemporary influence of humanity on Earth, environmental law, conservation, environmentalism with major worldwide impact and environmental issues.

== Events ==
Date / period	Type of event	Event	Topics	Image

=== Environmental disasters ===
2023's June-July-August season was the warmest on record globally by a large margin, as El Niño conditions continued to develop.

September 2023 was the warmest September on record globally, with an average surface air temperature 0.5 °C above the temperature of the previous warmest September (2020).

== See also ==
=== General ===
- 2020s in environmental history
- 2023 in climate change
- Green recovery
- 2023 in space
- List of environmental issues
- List of years in the environment
- Outline of environmental studies

=== Natural environment ===
- List of large earthquakes in the 21st century
- List of large volcanic eruptions in the 21st century
- Lists of extinct animals#Recent extinction
- Category:Species described in 2023
- Category:Protected areas established in 2023

=== Artificial developments ===
- Timeline of sustainable energy research 2020–present
- 2023 in rail transport
- Human impact on the environment
- Disaster response
