= Nature Sustainability =

- Discipline: Sustainability
- Language: English
- Edited by: Monica Contestabile

Publication details
- History: 2018–present
- Publisher: Nature Portfolio (United Kingdom)
- Frequency: Monthly
- Open access: Hybrid
- Impact factor: 32.1 (2025)

Standard abbreviations
- ISO 4: Nat. Sustain.

Indexing
- ISSN: 2398-9629
- LCCN: 2019234604
- OCLC no.: 1021823668

Links
- Journal homepage; Online archive

Nature Sustainability is a monthly peer-reviewed scientific journal published by Nature Portfolio. It was established in 2018. The editor-in-chief is Monica Contestabile.

== Abstracting and indexing ==
The journal is abstracted and indexed in:

- Science Citation Index Expanded
- Scopus
- Social Sciences Citation Index

According to the Journal Citation Reports, the journal has a 2025 impact factor of 32.1.
