= Prioritization =

Arranging things in order of importance

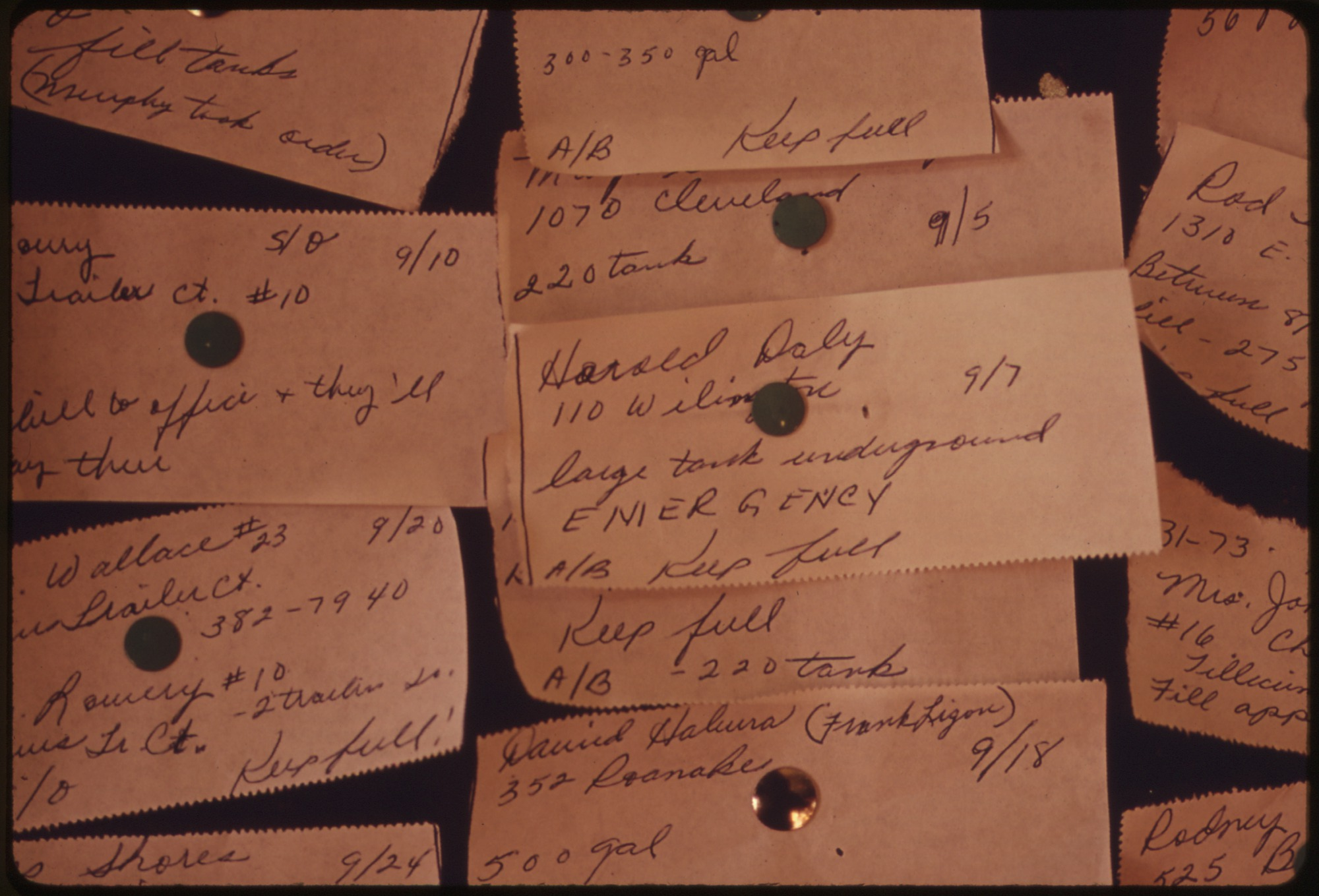
Creating a list may be the first step in establishing priorities.

Prioritization is the activity that arranges items or activities in order of urgency.

In the context of medical evaluation it is the establishment of the importance or the urgency of actions that are necessary to preserve the welfare of client or patient. In the clinical context, establishing priorities aids in the rationale and justification for the use of limited resources. Priority setting is influenced by time, money, and expertise. A risk priority number assessment is one way to establish priorities that may be difficult to establish in a health care setting.

Software has been designed to assist professionals in establishing priorities in a specific business setting.
