= VALL-E =

Speech synthesis software

- Developer: Microsoft
- Platform: Cloud computing platforms
- Website: https://www.microsoft.com/en-us/research/project/vall-e-x/

VALL-E is a generative artificial intelligence system for speech synthesis developed by Microsoft Research and announced on January 5, 2023. It can "recreate any voice from a three-second sample clip". It has been trained on 60,000 hours of English language speech from Meta’s audio library LibriLight.

== See also ==
- Amazon Polly
- Audio deepfake
- Comparison of speech synthesizers
- Deep learning speech synthesis
- Natural language generation
- Speechify
- Voice phishing
- Zero-shot learning
