= Governance failure =

A governance failure refers to any failures of governance or ineffectiveness of governance processes.

== General ==
Jessop argues for conceiving governance as a provider of flexibility for decision-making structures opposed to rigid state bureaucracy or market laws. From this approach failures would equate to failures of the governance structure. According to him new constellations of governance may compensate for state failure.

Peters and Pierre state that it is the continuous task of government to adapt to growing complexity.

Dixon and Dogan write that constructive governance discourses are creative opportunities for people with disparate governance perspectives to find solutions to threatening governance failure.

== Policy failure ==
Governance failure may also refer to what can also be described as policy failures − the effectiveness, efficiency, and resilience of specific policies. A frequently mentioned example of a policy failure is the war on drugs. Policy failure can be due to misuse of or inefficient investment in science.

== See also ==
- Active citizenship
- Group decision-making
  - Evidence-based policy
    - Resource allocation
  - Collaborative decision-making software
    - Online participation
- Legitimacy (political)
- Global governance failure
- Impact assessment
- Systems theory
  - Structural fix
- Collective problem solving
- Privatization
- Market failure
- Adaptation
- Criticism of democracy
- Criticism of capitalism
- Market fundamentalism
- Political finance
