= Diet and cancer =

Connections between dietary habits and cancer

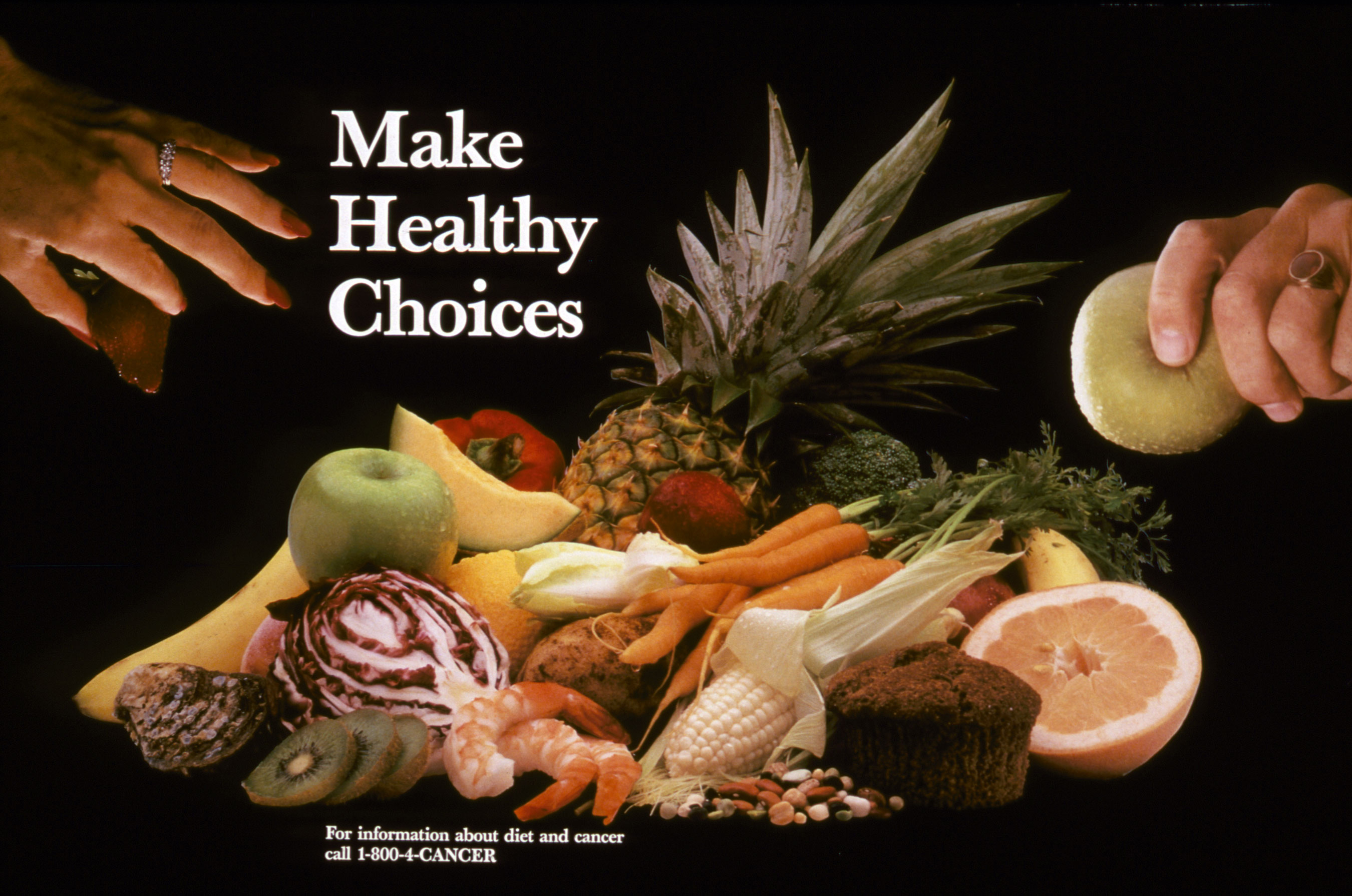
Advertisement suggesting that a healthy diet helps prevent cancer

Many dietary recommendations have been proposed to reduce the risk of cancer, few have significant supporting scientific evidence. Obesity and drinking alcohol have been correlated with the incidence and progression of some cancers. Lowering the consumption of sweetened beverages is recommended as a measure to address obesity.

Some specific foods are linked to specific cancers. There is strong evidence that processed meat and red meat intake increases risk of colorectal cancer. Aflatoxin B_{1}, a frequent food contaminant, increases risk of liver cancer, while drinking coffee is associated with a reduced risk. Betel nut chewing causes oral cancer. Stomach cancer is more common in Japan due to its high-salt diet.

Dietary recommendations for cancer prevention typically include weight management and eating a healthy diet, consisting mainly of "vegetables, fruit, whole grains and fish, and a reduced intake of red meat, animal fat, and refined sugar." A healthy dietary pattern may lower cancer risk by 10–20%. There is no clinical evidence that diets or specific foods can cure cancer.

== Types of diet ==
=== Restrictive diets ===
It is a popular misconception that cancer can be treated by "starving" a tumour or restricting carbohydrate intake, when in reality the health of people with cancer is best served by following a healthy diet. A number of specific diets and diet-based regimes have been claimed to be useful against cancer, including the Breuss diet, Gerson therapy, the Budwig protocol and the macrobiotic diet. None of these diets has been found to be effective, and some of them have been found to be harmful.

=== Dietary patterns ===
Nutritional epidemiologists use multivariate statistics, such as principal components analysis and factor analysis, to measure how patterns of dietary behavior influence the risk of developing cancer. (The most well-studied dietary pattern is the Mediterranean diet.) Based on their dietary pattern score, epidemiologists categorize people into quantiles. To estimate the influence of dietary behavior on risk of cancer, they measure the association between quantiles and the distribution of cancer prevalence (in case–control studies) and cancer incidence (in longitudinal studies). They usually include other variables in their statistical model to account for the other differences between people with and without cancer (confounders). For breast cancer, there is a replicated trend for women with a more "prudent or healthy" diet, i.e. higher in fruits and vegetables, to have a lower risk of cancer.

Unhealthy dietary patterns are associated with a higher body mass index suggesting a potential mediating effect of obesity on cancer risk.

==== Western pattern diet ====
The Western pattern diet has been generally linked to increased risk for colorectal cancer. Meta-analyses have found that diet patterns consistent with those of the Western pattern diet are positively correlated with risk for prostate cancer. Greater adherence to a Western pattern diet was also found to increase the overall risk of mortality due to cancer.

No significant relation has been established between the Western pattern diet and breast cancer.

==== Mediterranean diet ====
A meta-analysis in 2008 found that strictly following the Mediterranean diet was correlated with a decreased risk of dying from cancer by 6%. Another 2014 review found that adherence to the Mediterranean diet was associated with a decreased risk of death from cancer. A 2017 review found a decreased rate of cancer, although evidence was weak. An updated review in 2021 found that the Mediterranean diet is associated with a 13% lower risk of cancer mortality in the general population.

== Dietary components ==
=== Alcohol ===
Alcohol is associated with an increased risk of a number of cancers. It has been reported that 3.6% of all cancer cases and 3.5% of cancer deaths worldwide are attributable to drinking of alcohol. Breast cancer in women is linked with alcohol intake. Alcohol also increases the risk of cancers of the mouth, esophagus, pharynx and larynx, colorectal cancer, liver cancer, stomach and ovaries. The International Agency for Research on Cancer (Centre International de Recherche sur le Cancer) of the World Health Organization has classified alcohol as a group 1 carcinogen. Its evaluation states, "There is sufficient evidence for the carcinogenicity of alcoholic beverages in humans. ... Alcoholic beverages are carcinogenic to humans (Group 1)."

=== Saturated fat ===
Several reviews of case–control studies have found that saturated fat intake is associated with breast cancer risk and mortality. Observational studies have shown that a diet high in saturated fat is associated with increased prostate cancer risk.

A 2024 systematic review found that higher levels of myristic acid, palmitic acid and stearic acid are associated with increased cancer risk. A 2026 umbrella review found that saturated fat intake was associated with several site-specific cancers including breast and liver cancers.

=== Sugar ===
Sugar consumption does not directly cause cancer. Cancer Council Australia have stated that "there is no evidence that consuming sugar makes cancer cells grow faster or cause cancer". There is an indirect relationship between sugar consumption and obesity-related cancers through increased risk of excess body weight.

The American Institute for Cancer Research and World Cancer Research Fund recommend that people should limit sugar consumption.

=== Eggs ===
A 2015 meta-analysis found an association between higher egg consumption (five a week) with increased risk of breast cancer compared to no egg consumption. Another meta-analysis found that egg consumption may increase ovarian cancer risk.

A 2019 meta-analysis found an association between high egg consumption and risk of upper aero-digestive tract cancers in hospital-based case-control studies.

A 2021 review did not find a significant association between egg consumption and breast cancer. A 2021 umbrella review found that egg consumption significantly increases the risk of ovarian cancer.

=== Processed and red meat ===
There is strong evidence that processed meat and red meat intake increases risk of colorectal cancer. The American Cancer Society in their "Diet and Physical Activity Guideline", stated "evidence that red and processed meats increase cancer risk has existed for decades, and many health organizations recommend limiting or avoiding these foods."

On October 26, 2015, the International Agency for Research on Cancer of the World Health Organization reported that eating processed meat (e.g., bacon, ham, hot dogs, sausages) or red meat was linked to some cancers and classed them as group 1 (carcinogenic to humans) and group 2a (probably carcinogenic to humans) carcinogens respectively. There is some evidence that suggests that heme and nitrite are involved in the processes linking red and processed meat intake with colorectal cancer. Heme is present in particular in red meat and nitrite is used as curing salt in many processed meats.

Processed and unprocessed red meat intake is associated with an increased risk of breast cancer.

The World Health Organization has found that the consumption of processed meat, and potentially red meat, promote carcinogenesis and can increase the risk of colorectal cancer. Colorectal cancer is the second most common cause of cancer death in the world. A 2023 systematic review and meta analysis found that meat consumption was associated with an increased risk of colorectal cancer, colon cancer and rectal cancer. A meta analysis reported in 2024, provided evidence that consumption of high levels of red meat increased the risk of developing esophageal, pancreatic, liver, colon, rectal and colorectal cancers, and that consumption of processed meat (as distinct from red meat) also increased the levels of pancreatic, colon, rectal and colorectal cancers. In contrast, high consumption of fish significantly reduced the risk of colon, rectal and colorectal cancers.

A metabolic link has been suggested between a fat- and meat rich diet and cancer associated gut microbes that convert primary bile acids into secondary carcinogenic bile acids.

=== Salted fish ===
Due to the elevated levels of nitrites, consuming salted fish increases risk of stomach cancer and nasopharyngeal cancer. The International Agency for Research on Cancer classify salted fish (Chinese-style) as a Group 1 carcinogen.

=== Fiber, fruits and vegetables ===
There is strong evidence that consumption of dietary fiber reduces risk of colorectal cancer. Two 2020 meta-analyses found that a high fiber intake was associated with a lower risk of both premenopausal and postmenopausal breast cancers and a higher survival rate in patients with breast cancer.

A 2021 review found that there is moderate-quality evidence 200g of fruit intake per day is associated with a lower risk of breast cancer. Another review found that high total fruit and vegetable consumption are associated with reduced risk of breast cancer. A 2024 review found convincing evidence for high dietary fiber intake associated with lower breast cancer risk.

==== Pickled vegetables ====
In 1993, the World Health Organization listed traditional Asian pickled vegetables as possible carcinogens, and the British Journal of Cancer released an online 2009 meta-analysis of research on pickles as increasing the risks of esophageal cancer. The report, citing limited data in a statistical meta-analysis, indicates a potential twofold increased risk of esophageal cancer associated with Asian pickled vegetable consumption. Results from the research are described as having "high heterogeneity" and the study results indicated that further well-designed prospective studies were warranted. However, according to the authors, "The majority of subgroup analyses showed a statistically significant association between consuming pickled vegetables and Oesophageal Squamous Cell Carcinoma".

A 2020 meta analysis of stomach cancer risk factors also found a positive correlation between pickled vegetable consumption and stomach cancer.

The 2009 meta-analysis reported heavy infestation of pickled vegetables with fungi. Some common fungi can facilitate the formation of N-nitroso compounds, which are strong esophageal carcinogens in several animal models. Roussin red methyl ester, a non-alkylating nitroso compound with tumour-promoting effect in vitro, was identified in pickles from Linzhou, Henan (formerly Linxian) in much higher concentrations than in samples from low-incidence areas. Fumonisin mycotoxins have been shown to cause liver and kidney tumours in rodents.

A 2017 study in the Chinese Journal of Cancer has linked salted vegetables (zha cai, common in Chinese cuisine) to a fourfold increase in nasopharynx cancer. The researchers believe possible mechanisms include production of nitrosamines (a type of N-nitroso compound) by fermentation and activation of Epstein–Barr virus by fermentation products.

Historically, pickling caused health concerns for reasons associated with copper salts, as explained in the mid-19th century The English and Australian Cookery Book: "The evidence of the Lancet commissioner (Dr. Hassall) and Mr. Blackwell (of the eminent firm of Crosse and Blackwell) went to prove that the pickles sold in the shops are nearly always artificially coloured, and are thus rendered highly unwholesome, if not actually poisonous."

=== Flavonoids ===
Flavonoids (specifically flavonoids such as the catechins) are "the most common group of polyphenolic compounds in the human diet and are found ubiquitously in plants." While some studies have suggested flavonoids may have a role in cancer prevention, others have been inconclusive.

=== Methionine ===
Restriction of methionine has been suggested as a strategy in cancer growth control in cancers that depend on methionine for survival and proliferation. According to a 2012 review, the effect of methionine restriction on cancer has yet to be studied directly in humans and "there is still insufficient knowledge to give reliable nutritional advice".

Reviews of epidemiological studies have found no association between dietary methionine and breast or pancreatic cancer risk.

=== Mushrooms ===
According to Cancer Research UK, "there is currently no evidence that any type of mushroom or mushroom extract can prevent or cure cancer", although research into some species continues.

A 2020 review found that higher mushroom consumption is associated with lower risk of breast cancer.

=== Dairy products ===
There is no scientific evidence that consuming dairy products causes cancer. The British Dietetic Association have described the idea that milk promotes hormone related cancerous tumour growth as a myth, stating "no link between dairy containing diets and risk of cancer or promoting cancer growth as a result of hormones". In 2024, Cancer Research UK stated "there is no reliable evidence that casein or hormones in dairy causes cancer in people". The American Cancer Society (ACS) does not make specific recommendations on dairy food consumption for cancer prevention. Higher-quality research is needed to characterise valid associations between dairy consumption and risk of and/or cancer-related mortality.

A 2023 review found no association between consumption of dairy products and breast cancer. Other recent reviews have found that low-fat dairy intake is associated with a decreased risk of breast cancer.

=== Whole grains ===
There is strong evidence that consumption of whole grains decreases risk of colorectal cancer.

=== Soy ===
The American Cancer Society have stated that "there is some evidence from human and lab studies that consuming traditional soy foods such as tofu may lower the risk of breast and prostate cancer, but overall the evidence is too limited to draw firm conclusions".

A 2023 review found that soy protein lowers breast cancer risk.

=== Ultra-processed foods ===
A 2023 review indicated that people who consume 10% more ultra-processed foods have an increased risk of various cancers, including colorectal, breast, and pancreatic cancer. Observational studies have reported associations between higher consumption of ultra-processed foods and increased risk of certain cancers, particularly colorectal cancer and, to a lesser extent, breast cancer. However, evidence for other cancer types remains limited or inconsistent, and current findings do not establish a causal relationship. UPFs with certain additives, preservatives, and contaminants are also linked to an increase in cancer risk.

=== Other ===
- Green tea consumption has no effect on cancer risk.
- A 2016 meta-analysis showed that women and men who drank coffee had a lower risk of liver cancer. An umbrella review of meta-analyses found that coffee was associated with a lower risk of liver and endometrial cancer.
- A 2014 systematic review found, "no firm evidence that vitamin D supplementation affects cancer occurrence in predominantly elderly community-dwelling women."

== See also ==
- Alcohol and cancer
- Alcohol and breast cancer
- Acrylamide
- Bovine Meat and Milk Factors
- Food, Nutrition, Physical Activity and the Prevention of Cancer: a Global Perspective
