= Health effects of salt =

Conditions associated with the consumption of either too much or too little salt

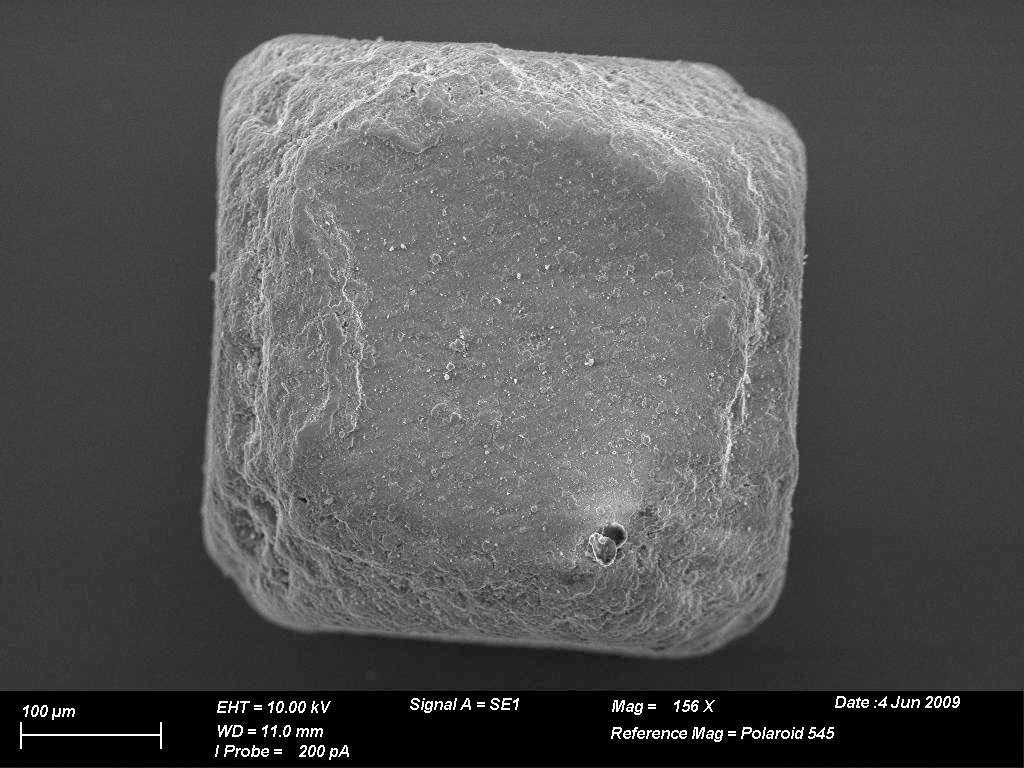
SEM image of a grain of table salt

The health effects of salt are the conditions associated with the consumption of either too much or too little salt. Salt is a mineral composed primarily of sodium chloride (NaCl) and is used in food for both preservation and flavor. Sodium ions are needed in small quantities by most living things, as are chlorine ions. Salt is involved in regulating the water content (fluid balance) of the body. Both sodium and chlorine ions are used for electrical signaling in the nervous system, among other biological roles.

Salt is usually high in ultra-processed and hyperpalatable foods. In 2020, the World Health Organization (WHO) recommended that adults consume no more than 5 grams (0.18 oz) (just under a teaspoon) of salt per day, an amount providing about 2 grams (0.071 oz) of sodium per day. The WHO further recommends that salt intake be adjusted for those aged 2 to 15 years old based on their energy requirements relative to those of adults. High sodium consumption (5 g or more of salt per day) and insufficient potassium intake (less than 3.5 grams (0.12 oz) per day) have been linked to high blood pressure and increased risk of heart disease, stroke, and kidney disease.

As an essential nutrient, sodium is involved in numerous cellular and organ functions. Several national health organizations recommend limiting sodium consumption to 2.3 g per day. However, some studies have found that sodium intake that is below 3 g per day (equivalent to about 7.5 g of salt) may increase the risk for cardiovascular disease and early death. The cardiovascular benefits of reducing salt consumption are similar to population-wide reductions in obesity, cholesterol, and tobacco use.

== Acute effects ==
Hypernatremia (high blood sodium level, above 145 mEq/L) causes thirst, and due to brain cell shrinkage may cause confusion, muscle twitching, or spasms. With severe elevation, seizures and comas may occur. Death can be caused by ingestion of large amounts of salt at a time (about 1 g per kg of body weight). Deaths have also been caused by the use of salt solutions as emetics, typically after suspected poisoning.

Hyponatremia, or blood sodium levels below 135 mEq/L, causes brain cells to swell; the symptoms can be subtle and may include altered personality, lethargy, and confusion. In severe cases, when blood sodium falls below 115 mEq/L, stupor, muscle twitching or spasms, seizures, coma, and death can result.

== Long-term effects ==
Major health organizations and recent reviews state that high consumption of salt increases the risk of several diseases in children and adults.

Excess sodium consumption increases blood pressure. Approximately 15% of adults have inverse salt sensitivity, with blood pressure increasing from eating less salt. Some studies suggest a U-shaped association between salt intake and mortality, with increased mortality associated with both excessively low and excessively high salt intake. Larger reductions in salt intake lead to larger decreases in blood pressure.

Normotensive overweight/obese patients who were salt restricted for six weeks showed an endothelin 1 (ET-1) decrease of 14% associated with a 45% increase in flow-mediated dilation (FMD). ET-1 has autocrine action on endothelial cells causing the release of nitric oxide. Another study using middle-aged or older adults with moderately elevated blood pressure taking sodium chloride tablets or placebo tablets for a few weeks showed that sodium restriction increased nitric oxide and tetrahydrobiopterin (BH4) resulting in improved FMD without affecting blood pressure. The suppression of endothelium production of nitric oxide is the result of oxidative stress on the vasculature.

Health effects associated with excessive sodium consumption include:

- Stroke and cardiovascular disease.
- High blood pressure: Evidence shows an association between salt intakes and blood pressure among different populations and age ranges in adults. Reduced salt intake also results in a small but statistically significant reduction in blood pressure.
- Left ventricular hypertrophy (cardiac enlargement): "Evidence suggests that high salt intake causes left ventricular hypertrophy. This is a strong risk factor for cardiovascular disease, independently of blood pressure effects." "...there is accumulating evidence that high salt intake predicts left ventricular hypertrophy."
- Edema (fluid retention): A decrease in salt intake has been suggested to treat edema.
- Kidney disease: Excessive salt (sodium) intake, combined with an inadequate intake of water, can cause hypernatremia. It can exacerbate renal disease. A US expert committee reported in 2013 the common recommendation by several authorities "to reduce daily sodium intake to less than 2,300 milligrams and further reduce intake to 1,500 mg among persons who are 51 years of age and older and those of any age who are African-American or have hypertension, diabetes, or chronic kidney disease", but concluded that there was no health-outcome-based rationale for reducing intake below 2,300 mg, and did not have a recommendation for an upper limit.

A meta-analysis investigated the association between sodium intake and health outcomes, including all-cause mortality and cardiovascular disease (CVD) events. Low sodium intake level was a mean of <115 mmol (2645 mg), usual sodium intake was 115–215 mmol (2645–4945 mg), and a high sodium intake was >215 mmol (4945 mg), concluding: "Both low sodium intakes and high sodium intakes are associated with increased mortality, consistent with a U-shaped association between sodium intake and health outcomes".

=== Salt-preserved foods ===
The American Institute for Cancer Research (AICR) and World Cancer Research Fund International (WCRF) have stated that there is strong evidence that consuming salted foods including salt-preserved fish and salt-preserved foods in general increases risk of stomach cancer and that the high salt content of processed meat may result in damage to the stomach mucosal lining. The American Cancer Society have stated that "stomach cancer risk is increased in people whose diets include large amounts of foods preserved by salting, such as salted fish and meat and pickled vegetables." Additionally, an excessive intake of salt has a dose-response relationship with elevated blood pressure, increasing the risk of several cardiovascular diseases.

=== Possible effects of microplastic contamination ===
Microplastic contamination in sea salt has been confirmed in all areas of the world, ranging from zero to 1,674 particles per kilogram. The most common particles are polypropylene, followed by polyethylene and nylon. Microplastic particles per kg sea salt tend to be higher when sourced from Asian countries. Salt sourced from India ranged from 115 to 560 particles/kg. Sea salt sourced from China reported more than 400/kg. Microplastics also accrue in shellfish grown or harvested in regions with microplastic contamination of seawater, and are a significant contributor to human exposure. The extent to which humans are exposed to microplastics in foods and beverages can be assessed via measuring microplastics content in feces, but the health effects, if any, are poorly understood.

== Dietary recommendations ==
Recommended intakes of salt are usually expressed in terms of sodium intake as an Adequate Intake (AI) and a Tolerable upper intake level (Upper Limit or UL). Salt (as sodium chloride) contains 39.3 percent of sodium by weight.

Country	Description	Sodium intake mg per day	Salt intake mg per day	Authority	Remarks
United Kingdom	The Reference Nutrient Intake defined for a typical adult	RNI: 1600	RNI: 4000	Scientific Advisory Committee on Nutrition (SACN) (2003)	However, average adult intake is two and a half times the RNI. SACN states, "The target salt intakes set for adults and children do not represent ideal or optimum consumption levels, but achievable population goals." The Food Safety Authority of Ireland endorses the UK targets.
Canada	An Adequate Intake (AI) and Upper Limit (UL) recommended for persons aged 4 years or more.	AI: 1200–1500; UL: 1900–2300	AI: 3000–3750; UL: 5500–5750	Health Canada (2017)	"Canadians are consuming too much sodium without understanding the risks to their health. Canadians should lower their sodium intakes, as part of maintaining a healthy lifestyle, to reduce the risk of high blood pressure, stroke and heart and kidney disease." (2017)
Australia and New Zealand	An Adequate Intake (AI) and an Upper Level of intake (UL) defined for adults	AI: 460–920; UL: 2300	AI: 1150–2300; UL: 5750	NHMRC (2006)	Not able to define a recommended dietary intake (RDI)
United States	An Adequate Intake (AI) and Upper Limit (UL) defined for adults. A different UL defined for the special group comprising people over 51 years of age, African Americans and people with hypertension, diabetes, or chronic kidney disease (regardless of age).	UL: 2300; UL for special group: 1500	UL: 5750; UL for special group: 3750	Department of Agriculture and Department of Health and Human Services (2010)	The Food and Drug Administration itself does not make a recommendation, but refers readers to the dietary guidelines given by this authority.
Sweden	An Adequate Intake (AI) and Upper Level of intake (UL) defined for adults	AI: 2000 UL: 2400	AI: 5000 UL: 6000	Swedish Food Agency (2023)	An excessive intake of sodium increases the blood pressure, which in turn can lead to increased risk of cardiovascular diseases and kidney failure. It is estimated that one forth of the adults in Sweden have high blood pressure, and almost half of all over 65 years of age. The Swedish recommendations are based on the Nordic Nutritional Recommendations (2012).
Nordic countries	An Adequate Intake (AI) and Chronic disease risk reduction (CDRR)	UL: 1500 CDRR: 2300	UL: 2500 CDRR: 5750	The Nordic Nutritional Recommendations (NNR) (2023)	Adverse effects of high intake are high blood pressure and increased mortality.

As of 2009 the average sodium consumption in 33 countries was in the range of 2,700 to 4,900 mg/day. This ranged across many cultures, and together with animal studies, this suggests that sodium intake is tightly controlled by feedback loops in the body. This makes recommendations to reduce sodium consumption below 2,700 mg/day potentially futile. Upon review, an expert committee that was commissioned by the Institute of Medicine and the Centers for Disease Control and Prevention reported that there was no health outcome-based rationale for reducing daily sodium intake levels below 2,300 milligrams, as had been recommended by previous dietary guidelines; the report did not have a recommendation for an upper limit of daily sodium intake.

The United States Centers for Disease Control and Prevention (CDC) states that excess sodium can increase blood pressure and the risk for heart disease and stroke in some individuals. Therefore, health authorities recommend limitations on dietary sodium. The United States Department of Health and Human Services recommends that individuals consume no more than 1500–2300 mg of sodium (3750–5750 mg of salt) per day.

Although sea salt is sometimes promoted as being healthier than table salt, both forms have the same sodium content.

== Labeling ==
UK: The Food Standards Agency defines the level of salt in foods as follows: "High is more than 1.5 g salt per 100 g (or 0.6 g sodium). Low is 0.3 g salt or less per 100 g (or 0.1 g sodium). If the amount of salt per 100 g is in between these figures, then that is a medium level of salt." In the UK, foods produced by some supermarkets and manufacturers have 'traffic light' colors on the front of the packet: red (high), amber (medium), or green (low).

USA: The FDA Food Labeling Guide stipulates whether a food can be labeled as "free" "low," or "reduced/less" in respect of sodium. When other health claims are made about a food (e.g., low in fat, calories, etc.), a disclosure statement is required if the food exceeds 480 mg of sodium per 'serving'.

== Campaigns ==
=== Australia ===
In Australia, the "Drop the Salt! Campaign" aimed to reduce the consumption of salt by Australians to 6g per day over the course of five years ending in 2012.

=== South Africa ===
In 2016, South Africa was the first country to legislate the maximum amount of salt in processed food. The legislation was aimed at addressing the fact that 60% of salt in the diet was contributed to by processed foods, with 65% of all ethnic groups consuming sodium in excess of 6g/day, and 40% of young adults in excess of 9g/day.

=== United Kingdom ===
Consensus Action on Salt and Health (CASH) established in the United Kingdom in 1996, actively campaigns to raise awareness of the negative health effect of high intake of salt. The 2008 focus includes raising awareness of high levels of salt hidden in sweet foods that are marketed towards children. In 2004, Britain's Food Standards Agency started a public health campaign called "Salt – Watch it", which recommends no more than 6 g of salt per day; it features a character called Sid the Slug and was criticised by the Salt Manufacturers Association (SMA). The Advertising Standards Authority did not uphold the SMA complaint in its adjudication. In March 2007, the FSA launched the third phase of their campaign with the slogan "Salt. Is your food full of it?" fronted by comedian Jenny Eclair.

=== United States ===
==== Federal programs ====
From around 2010 to 2022, as part of the Sodium Reduction in Communities Program (SRCP), the United States Centers for Disease Control and Prevention funded local communities across the United States to implement a variety of policy, systems, and environmental change strategies focused on increasing access to lower sodium foods in a variety of settings such as hospitals, congregate meal sites, and university settings.

==== Voluntary initiatives ====
In January 2010, New York City launched the National Salt Reduction Initiative (NSRI). It was the only coordinated, voluntary effort to reduce sodium in the United States, an effort supported by the Institute of Medicine as an interim goal in advance of federal action on sodium reduction.

As of 2013, over 90 state and local health authorities and health organizations had signed on as partners of the NSRI. Together, the NSRI partnership encouraged food manufacturers and chain restaurants to voluntarily commit to NSRI sodium reduction targets for 2012 and 2014. The NSRI aimed to reduce sodium in the food supply by 25 percent in five years and reduce population sodium intake by 20 percent in the same time, thereby reducing risk for heart attacks and strokes.

==== Taxation ====
In the United States, taxation of sodium has been proposed as a method of decreasing sodium intake and thereby improving health in countries where typical salt consumption is high. Taking an alternative view, the Salt Institute, a salt industry body based in North America, is active in promoting the use of salt, and questioning or opposing the recommended restrictions on salt intake.

=== Sweden ===
In 1989 the Swedish Food Agency launched the symbol Nyckelhålet (The Green Keyhole). The symbol is a public health campaign that aims to help consumers to find healthier food alternatives, and the requirements for using the symbol differs between food categories. Apart from salt, the requirements include fat content, fat quality, fibre content and sugar. It is voluntary for food manufacturers to apply for the symbol on food items that fulfill the requirements, and the application is usually reviewed by the municipal environment and health protection board. Since June 2009, the symbol is also used in Norway and Denmark.

== Dietary reduction ==
A low sodium diet reduces the intake of sodium by the careful selection of food. The use of a salt substitute can provide a taste offsetting the perceived blandness of low-salt food; potassium chloride is widely used for this purpose. The World Health Organization (WHO) recommends daily potassium intake of not less than 3,510 mg. Government interventions such as food product reformulation and food procurement policy have the potential to reduce the population salt intake.

Studies found that excessively low sodium intake, below about three grams (3,000 mg) of salt per day, is associated with increased mortality and higher risk for cardiovascular disease.

A 2020 Cochrane systematic review concluded that, for white people with hypertension, reducing salt intake results in a decrease of about 4 mmHg (about 3.5%) of their blood pressure; in white participants without hypertension, the reduction was instead 0.4 mmHg. Low-quality evidence indicates a greater reduction of blood pressure in black (4.02 mmHg normotensive; 6.64 mmHg hypertensive) and Asian (1.50 mmHg normotensive; 7.75 mmHg hypertensive) people. The review also indicated that reduced salt intake has more consistent potential side effects on hormones and lipid levels in people with normal blood pressure.

In people with chronic kidney disease, including those on dialysis, there is high-certainty evidence that dietary salt restriction may help to lower systolic and diastolic blood pressure, as well as albuminuria. The risk of hypotensive symptoms, such as dizziness, may also increase in some people, with moderate certainty. It is unclear whether this affects the dosage required for anti-hypertensive medications. The effect of salt restriction on extracellular fluid, oedema, and total body weight reduction is also uncertain.
