= Animal source foods =

Food that comes from animals

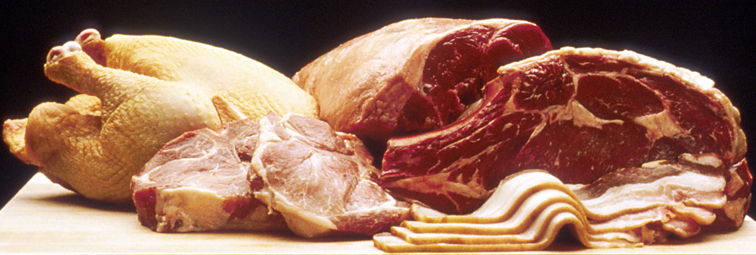
Various raw meats

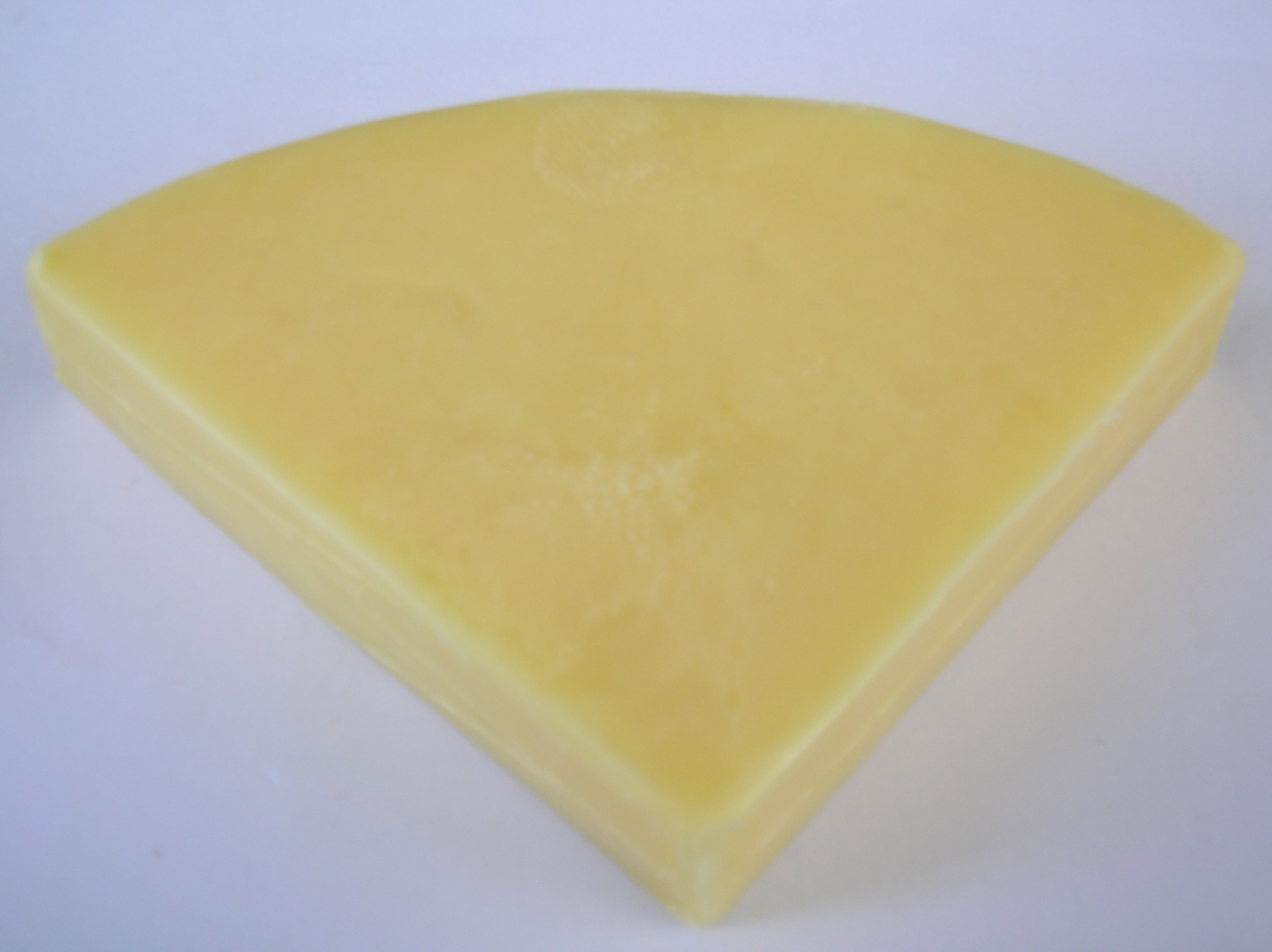
Dunlop cheese from Ayrshire, Scotland.

Animal source foods (ASF) include many food items that come from an animal source such as fish, meat, dairy, eggs and honey. Many individuals consume little ASF or even none for long periods of time by either personal choice or necessity, as ASF may not be accessible or available to these people.

== Nutrients in animal source foods ==
Six micronutrients are richly found in ASF: vitamin A, vitamin B_{12}, riboflavin (also called vitamin B_{2}), calcium, iron and zinc. They play a critical role in the growth and development of children. Inadequate stores of these micronutrients, either resulting from inadequate intake or poor absorption, is associated with poor growth, anemias (iron deficiency anemia and macrocytic anemia), rickets, night blindness, impaired cognitive functioning, neuromuscular deficits, diminished work capacity, psychiatric disorders and death. Some of these effects, such as impaired cognitive development from an iron deficiency, are irreversible.

Micronutrient deficiency is associated in poor early cognitive development. Programs designed to address these micronutrient deficiencies should be targeted to infants, children, and pregnant women. To address these significant micronutrient deficiencies, some global health researchers and practitioners developed and piloted a snack program in Kenya school children.

== Animal source food production ==
According to a 2006 United Nations study, the livestock industry sector emerges as one of the top two or three most significant contributors to the most serious environmental problems, at every scale from local to global." As such, using plant-derived foods is typically considered better for the interests of the environment. Despite this, the raising of certain animals can be more environmentally sound than others. According to the Farralones Institute's report from 1976, raising rabbits, and chickens (on a well-considered approach) for food can still be quite sustainable. As such, the production of meat and other produce, such as eggs, may still be considered environmentally friendly (if this is done in an industrial, high-efficiency manner). In addition, raising goats (for goat milk and meat) can also be environmentally quite friendly and has been favored by certain environmental activists, such as Mahatma Gandhi.

The planetary diet of the EAT-Lancet commission has advised substantial reductions in consumption of ASF on the basis that these diets threaten sustainability because of their environmental footprint and negative health impacts. This report was challenged by Adegbola T. Adesogan and colleagues in 2020 who stated that it "fail[ed] to adequately include the experience of marginalized women and children in low- and middle-income countries whose diets regularly lack the necessary nutrients" and ASF offer the best source of nutrient rich food for children aged 6–23 months.

Between 1990–2018, global intakes (servings per week) increased for processed meat, unprocessed red meat, cheese, eggs, milk and seafood.

== Health effects ==
Animal-source foods are a diverse group of foods that are rich in bioavailable nutrients including calcium, iron, zinc, vitamins B12, vitamin D, choline, DHA, and EPA. Animal-source and plant-based foods have complimentary nutrient profiles and balanced diets containing both reduce the risk of nutritional deficiencies. Animal-source foods such as eggs, fish, red meat and shellfish increase circulating TMAO concentrations. Excess consumption of processed meat, red meat, and saturated fat increases non-communicable disease risk.

Animal-source foods have been described as a suitable complementary food to improve growth in 6 to 24-month-old children in low and middle-income countries.

A 2022 review of animal-source foods found that red meat but not fish or eggs increases risk of type 2 diabetes. A 2023 review found that substituting animal-source with plant-based foods is associated with a lower risk of cardiovascular disease and all-cause mortality. A 2024 review found that plant-based meat alternatives have the potential to be healthier than animal-source foods and have smaller environmental footprints. A 2025 review found that replacing animal-source foods with plant-based foods was associated with a reduced cancer risk.

== See also ==
- Animal product
