= Salting (food) =

Preservation of food using salt

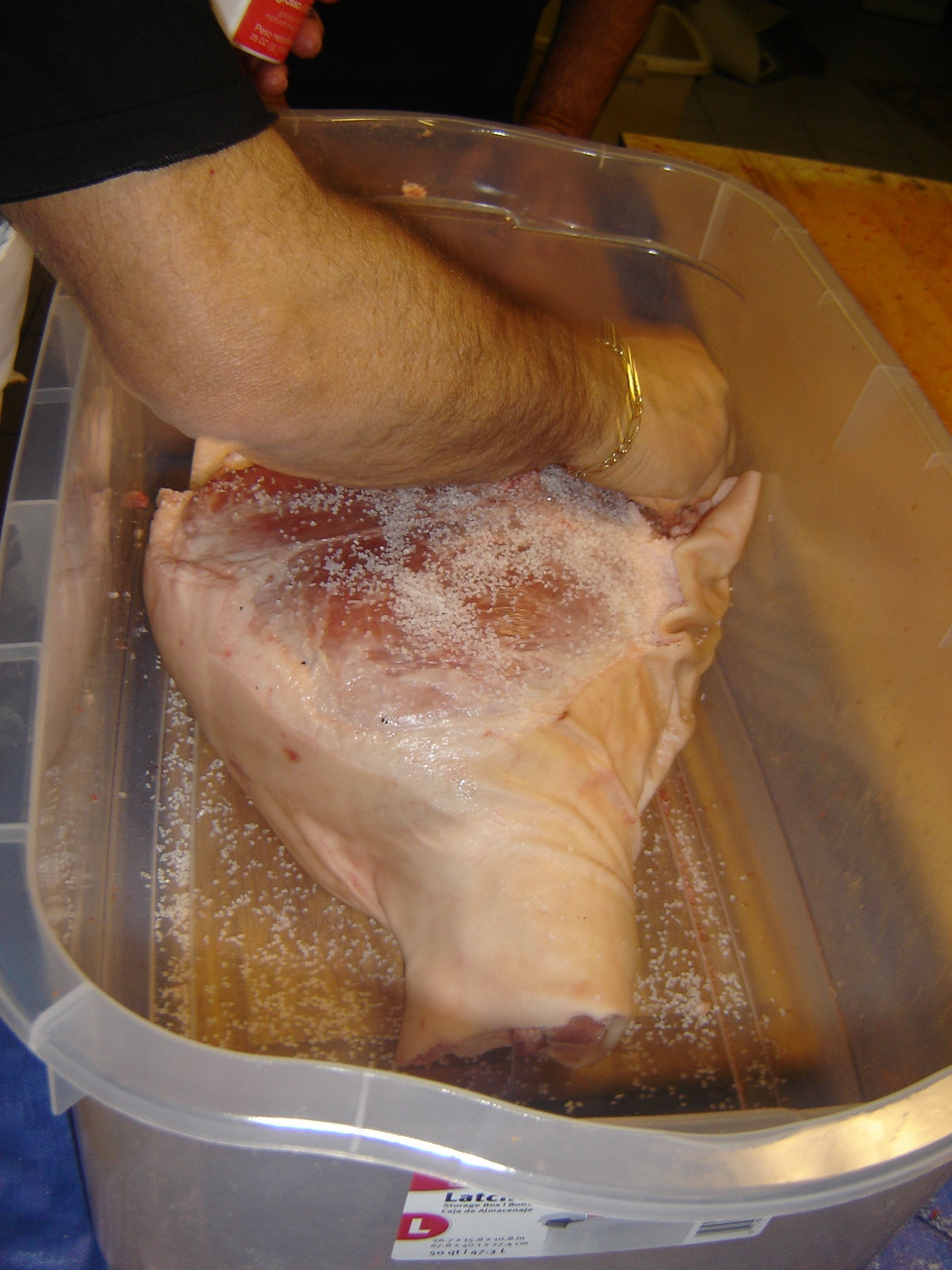
Sea salt being added to raw ham to make prosciutto

Salting is the preservation of food with dry edible salt. It is related to pickling in general and more specifically to brining (preparing food with brine, that is, salty water), and is one form of curing. It is one of the oldest methods of preserving food, and two historically significant salt-cured foods are salted fish (usually dried and salted cod or salted herring) and salt-cured meat (such as bacon). Vegetables such as runner beans and cabbage are also often preserved in this manner.

Salting is used because most bacteria, fungi and other potentially pathogenic organisms cannot survive in a highly salty environment, due to the hypertonic nature of salt. Any living cell in such an environment will become dehydrated through osmosis and die or become temporarily inactivated. Fine grained salts were more expensive but also absorbed moisture faster than coarse salt.

== History ==
=== Pre-modern ===
Salting could be combined with smoking to produce bacon in peasant homes. Instructions for preserving (salting) freshly killed venison in the 14th century involved covering the animal with bracken as soon as possible and carrying it to a place where it could be butchered, boiled in brine, and dry salted for long term preservation in a barrel. People in the 14th century also put salt on vegetables for taste.

Salted meat was a staple of the mariner's diet in the Age of Sail. It was stored in barrels, and often had to last for months at sea. The basic Royal Navy diet consisted of salted beef, salted pork, ship's biscuit, and oatmeal, supplemented with smaller quantities of peas, cheese and butter. Even in 1938, Eric Newby found the diet on the tall ship Moshulu to consist almost entirely of salted meat. The lack of refrigeration left little choice as the ship made voyages which could exceed 100 days passage between ports.

=== Modern ===
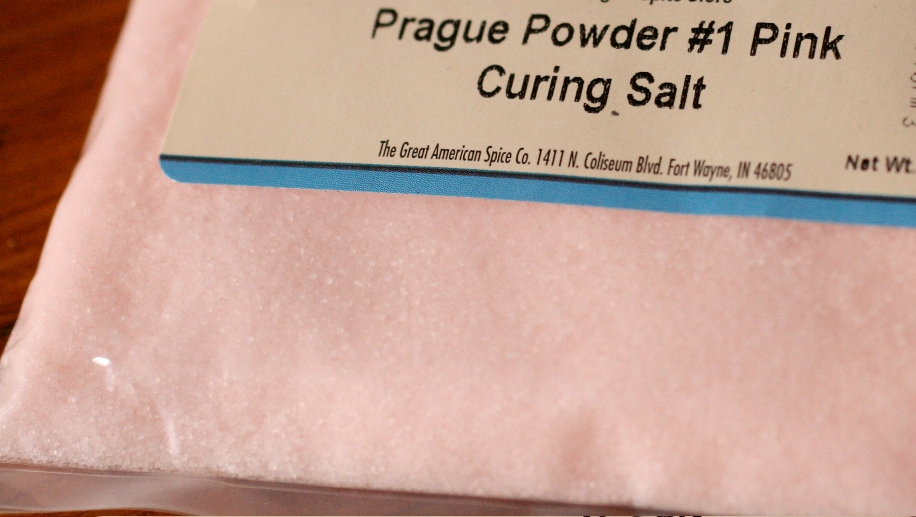
Bag of Prague powder #1, also known as "curing salt" or "pink salt." It is typically a combination of salt and sodium nitrite, with the pink color added to distinguish it from ordinary salt.

It was discovered in the 19th century that salt mixed with nitrates (such as saltpeter) would color meats red, rather than grey, and consumers at that time then strongly preferred the red-colored meat. The food hence preserved stays healthy and fresh for days avoiding bacterial decay.

== Salting in foods ==
=== Meat ===
Salting, either with dry salt or brine, was a common method of preserving meat until the middle of the 20th century, becoming less popular after the advent of refrigeration. Meat that had been preserved in this way was frequently called "junk" or "salt horse". One early method of salt-curing meat was corning, or applying large, coarse pellets of salt, which were rubbed into the meat to keep it from spoiling and to preserve it. This term originates from Old English and references the large corns or grains of salt used (see wiktionary:corn). Corned beef retains this name, although it is typically brined today.

Salt inhibits the growth of microorganisms by drawing water out of microbial cells through osmosis. Concentrations of salt up to 20% are required to kill most species of unwanted bacteria. Smoking, often used in the process of curing meat, adds chemicals to the surface of meat that reduce the concentration of salt required.

Various types of salted meat are staples of the diets of people in North Africa, Southern China, Scandinavia, coastal Russia, and in the Arctic. Some of those salted meats (or foods that contain salted meat) are bacon, biltong, cecina, corned beef, ham, jamón, jerky, pastrami, and salt pork.

=== Fish ===
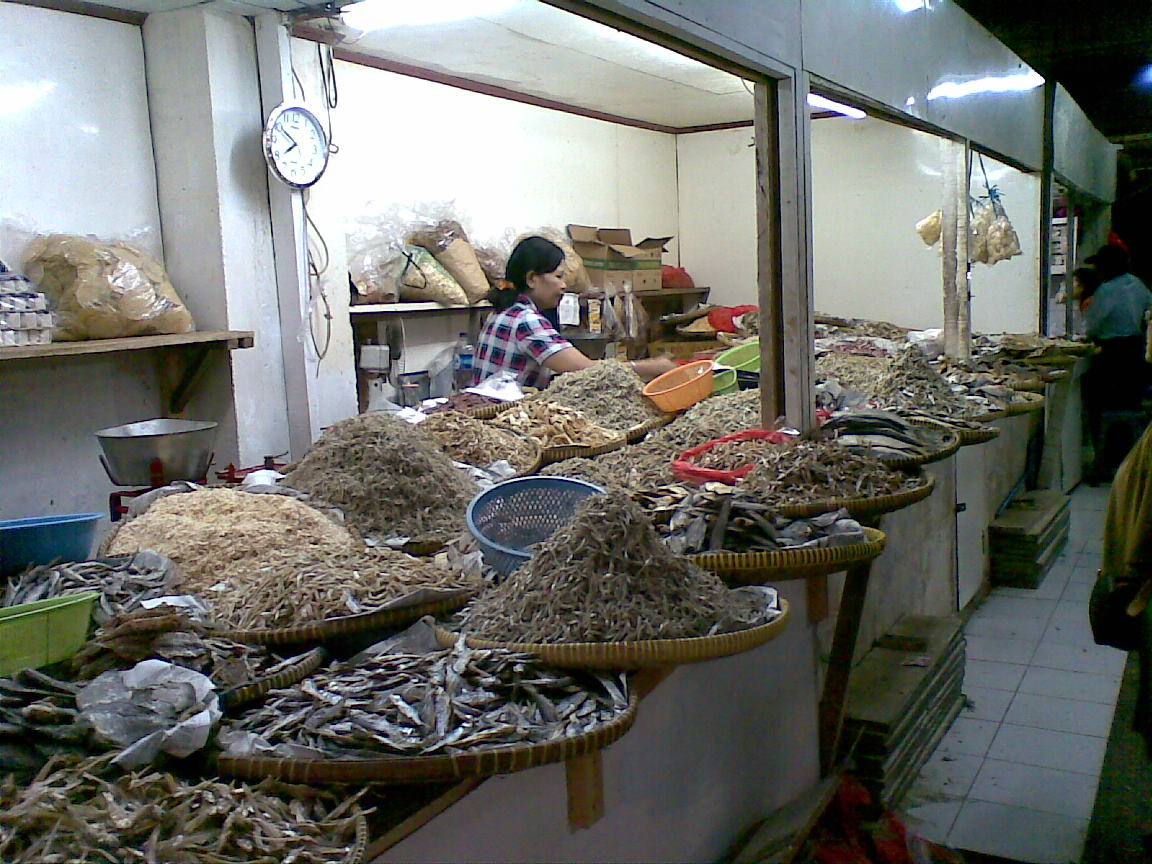
Various salted fish sold in a marketplace in a suburb of Jakarta, Indonesia

Drying or salting, either with dry salt or with brine, was the only widely available method of preserving fish until the 19th century. Dried fish and salted fish (or fish both dried and salted) are a staple of diets in the Caribbean, West Africa, North Africa, South Asia, Southeast Asia, the islands of Hawaii, Southern China, Scandinavia, parts of Canada including Newfoundland, coastal Russia, and in the Arctic. Like other salt-cured meats, it provides preserved animal protein even in the absence of refrigeration.

In more recent times, freeze-drying, water binding humectants, and fully automated equipment with temperature and humidity control have been added. Often a combination of these techniques is used.

== Religious customs ==
Jewish and Muslim dietary laws require the removal of blood from freshly slaughtered meat. Salt and brine are used for the purpose in both traditions, but salting is more common in Kosher Shechita (where it is all but required) than in Halal Dhabiha (as in most cases, draining alone will suffice).

== Health effects ==
The American Institute for Cancer Research (AICR) and World Cancer Research Fund International (WCRF) have stated that there is strong evidence that consuming salted foods including salt-preserved fish and salt-preserved foods in general increases risk of stomach cancer and that the high salt content of processed meat may result in damage to the stomach mucosal lining. The American Cancer Society have stated that "stomach cancer risk is increased in people whose diets include large amounts of foods preserved by salting, such as salted fish and meat and pickled vegetables." Additionally, an excessive intake of salt has a dose-response relationship with elevated blood pressure, increasing the risk of several cardiovascular diseases.

== See also ==
- Canning
- Curing (food preservation)
- Food preservation
- Food storage
- List of dried foods
