= Food, Nutrition, Physical Activity and the Prevention of Cancer: a Global Perspective =

Report by the World Cancer Research Fund

Food, Nutrition, Physical Activity and the Prevention of Cancer: a Global Perspective, also known as the Expert Report, was an expert report published by the World Cancer Research Fund global network in 2007. It reviewed all the evidence about the links between cancer and diet, physical activity and body fat and contains 10 recommendations for reducing cancer risk. Dietary and lifestyle patterns and cancer prevention: evidence and recommendations from CUP Global is the April 2025 publication of the series.

== The findings of the report ==
The overall findings of the report were that people can reduce their risk of cancer by eating healthily, being regularly physically active and maintaining a healthy weight. The report’s findings on the links between body fat and cancer were stronger than previously thought.

The Panel’s 10 recommendations for cancer prevention are:

Body Fatness: Be as lean as possible within the normal range of body weight

Physical Activity: Be physically active as part of everyday life. Regular activity and movement has been reported to keep hormone levels healthy. Some hormones when at a high level can increase your cancer risk. Physical activity can improve the immune system. This can effectively lower cancer risk even further. Scientists recommend that people “aim for 60 minutes or more of moderate activity every day, or 30 minutes or more of vigorous activity.”

Foods and drinks that promote weight gain: Limit consumption of energy-dense foods; Avoid sugary drinks. As calorie consumption is one of the harder tasks when it comes to monitoring weight-gain, it is a very important component in reducing the risk of cancer. Foods that have been processed heavily tend to contain more sugar and fat. This method usually increases the “taste” of those foods. As a result of the processing, the calorie level in those foods tends to spike. Monitoring the size and how many portions you are consuming each day of the processed foods tends to help reduce the risk of cancer. Foods that are typically low in calorie density tend to contain higher amounts of healthy fiber and water content.

Plant Foods: Eat mostly foods of plant origin

Animal Foods: Limit intake of red meat and avoid processed meat. According to the Report in reducing cancer risks, people should not consume more than 18 ounces or 500 grams (cooked weight) per week of red meats. Heme iron is a compound that gives red meat its color. If consumed in very high amounts, it has been shown to damage the colon lining. Preserved (smoking, curing, or salting) meats has been shown to include carcinogens.

Alcoholic Drinks: Limit alcoholic drinks. AICR, although recommending that alcohol should completely be avoided, they do notice that very small amounts can have a good effect on reducing coronary heart disease. Men and women should limit their daily alcohol consumption to 2 drinks and 1 drink, respectively. Continuing from the mid-1990s, evidence has grown stronger in suggesting that alcoholic drinks can risk certain types of mouth cancer. This includes pharynx, larynx, and esophagus. Scientific studies also suggest that colorectal cancer is reduced for men as well.

Preservation, processing, and preparation: Limit consumption of salt; Avoid mouldy cereals (grains) or pulses (legumes). It has been found that high levels of salt content can increase the risk of stomach cancer. According to the report, “Most people in the United States currently consume more than 2,400 mg.” Although most foods have a high salt content they may not taste “salty” to the consumer, further increasing the risk of stomach cancer. It is recommended that sodium levels in canned goods be checked before purchase. Sodium levels should also be checked in cereals and frozen meals.

Dietary supplements: Aim to meet nutritional needs through diet alone

Breastfeeding (Special Recommendation): Mothers to breastfeed; children to be breastfed

Cancer survivors (Special Recommendation): Follow the recommendations for cancer prevention

== Publishing the report ==
The Report took six years to produce and is thought to be the most comprehensive report of its kind. In the initial sweep, 500,000 studies were found, which were screened down to 22,000. Eventually, 7,000 were deemed relevant and met the rigorous quality criteria for definitive conclusions on cancer prevention to be drawn.

This information was then presented to an Expert Panel of 21 world-renowned scientists, which was chaired by Professor Sir Michael Marmot. The Panel reviewed the evidence and made 10 recommendations for cancer prevention.

== The impact of the Expert Report ==
New Scientist magazine called the report a “landmark in our understanding of diet and cancer”, while The Economist called it “the most rigorous study so far on the links between food, physical activity and cancer”. In the UK, it was the front page of six national newspapers, including The Times, which described the report’s recommendations as “The new rules for defeating cancer”.

It has also been referenced in prestigious publications such as the British Medical Journal and was also cited in a Cabinet Office report setting out a framework for food policies in the UK.

Project Director of the report Professor Martin Wiseman said: “Our recommendations are based on the best science available. They are recommendations, not commandments. The whole point of them is to give people the information they need to make their everyday choices informed ones.” Cancer Research UK has said that “it would be grossly irresponsible of charities like Cancer Research UK and the WCRF to not talk about things that we know make people more likely to get cancer.”

The report has affected behaviour. A YouGov survey, commissioned by WCRF UK a year after the launch, revealed that since the launch 23 per cent of people had tried to eat more fruit and vegetables as a result of the report; 18 per cent of people had tried to watch their weight and 18 per cent of people had tried to be more physically active.

In May 2009, the report was criticised by University College London pharmacologist David Colquhoun on his blog Improbable Science. Colquhoun questioned the Expert Panel's conclusion that there is convincing evidence that processed meat is a cause of cancer, claiming that although the studies mentioned in the report show some correlation between consumption of processed meat and increased incidence of colorectal cancer, they do not demonstrate a causal relationship.

== See also ==
- American Institute for Cancer Research
- Diet and cancer
- World Cancer Research Fund
- World Cancer Research Fund UK
