= National Heart Foundation of New Zealand =

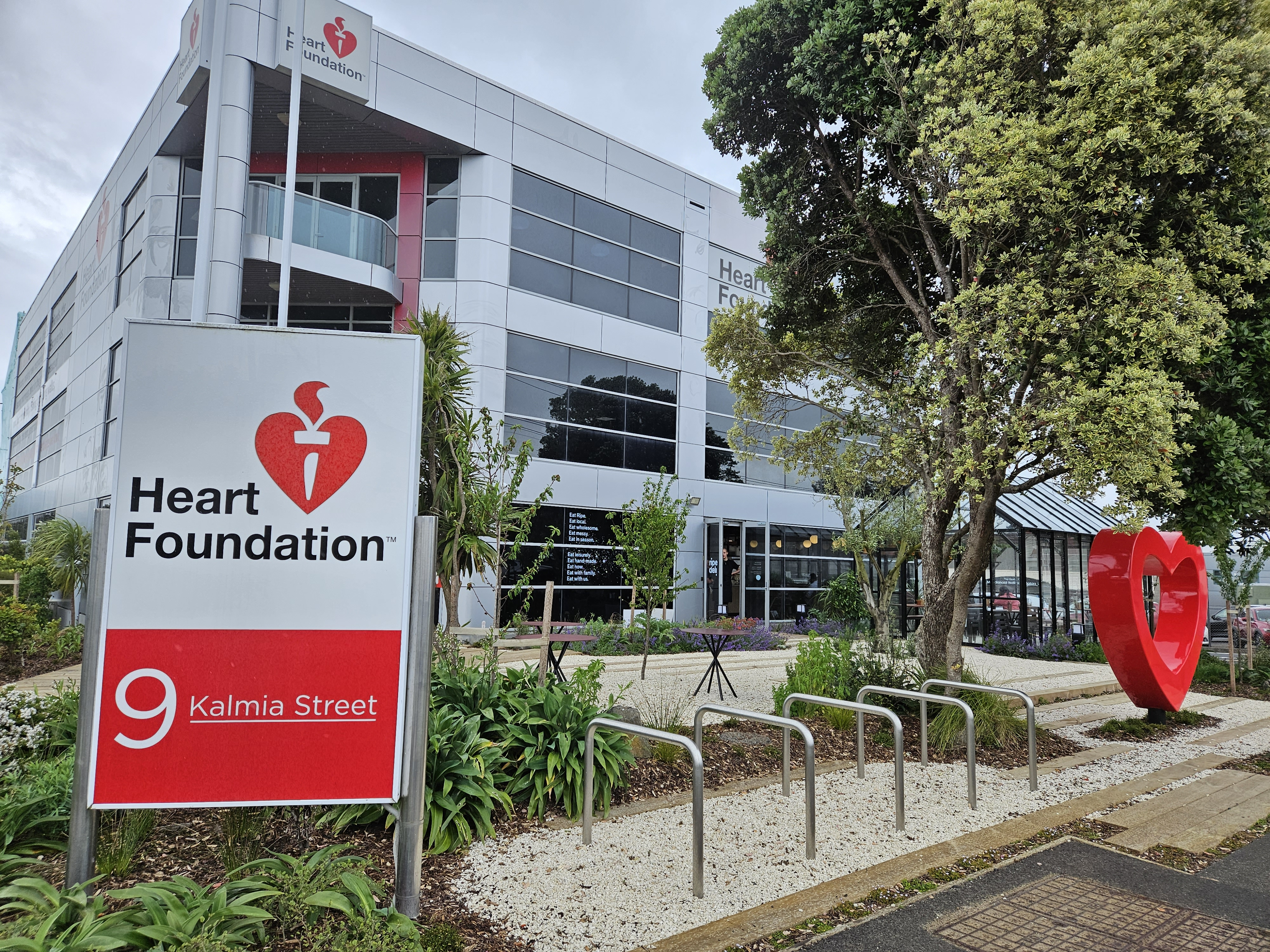
- Registration no.: CC23052
- Headquarters: 9 Kalmia Street, Ellerslie, Auckland
- Location: New Zealand
- Key people: Chief Executive; Clive Nelson
- Website: www.heartfoundation.org.nz

The National Heart Foundation of New Zealand (known as the Heart Foundation) is a registered New Zealand heart health charity established in 1968. It funds research into heart disease, and provides education to promote healthy lifestyles to prevent heart disease. It has awarded over $99 million to fund research and specialist training for cardiologists since 1970. The funding has provided over 1,800 research and training grants awarded in New Zealand.

The Heart Foundation's work includes:

- funding research into the treatment, cure and prevention of heart disease
- funding training and grants for New Zealand's cardiologists and researchers
- developing and implementing heart disease prevention programmes for schools and communities
- educating New Zealanders on how to live heart healthy lifestyles
- championing care for those at risk of, or living with, heart disease in New Zealand

== History ==
In 1968, a group of cardiologists established the National Heart Foundation with the aim of making an impact on New Zealand's heart disease epidemic. New Zealand's death rates due to heart disease were among the highest in the world at the time.

== Advertising campaigns ==
In 2015 the foundation released a television advertisement asking viewers "who gives the most realistic performance of a heart attack?", and showing several people acting as if they are experiencing a heart attack. In the end, the advertisement points to a person sitting in the background. It was designed to teach people that heart attacks are not as dramatic as what are portrayed in cinema. The advertisement received multiple awards.

In 2021, the Heart Foundation launched "Make the Right Call", an awareness campaign designed to help New Zealanders recognise the warning signs of a possible heart attack and call 111 immediately.

== Dietary advice ==
The foundation recommends a diet low in saturated fat and high in unsaturated fats (monosaturated and polyunsaturated) from nuts, seeds, plant oils, avocado and oily fish to reduce heart disease risk. They advise that 40% of the food trolley should be filled with fruit and vegetables. The foundation recommends people to replace refined grains with whole grains and consume at least three servings of whole grains per day for heart health.

In 2017, the foundation published a Dairy and Heart Health umbrella review which found an "overall neutral effect of dairy on cardiovascular risk for the general population". Their position paper stated that "the evidence overall suggests dairy products can be included in a heart-healthy eating pattern and choosing reduced-fat dairy over full-fat dairy reduces risk for some, but not all, cardiovascular risk factors".

In 2020, the foundation's Expert Nutrition Policy (ENP) issued a position statement that concluded that high consumption of red meat increases risk of heart disease and stroke by 16% therefore one should aim to reduce consumption of red meat below 350g per week and replace meat with plant sources of protein.

In 2022, the Heart Foundation released an updated position statement on sodium, concluding that reducing sodium intake lowers blood pressure and cardiovascular risk. The statement recommends that adults limit sodium intake to less than 2,000mg per day – the equivalent of 5 grams or 1 teaspoon of salt – to reduce the risk of heart disease and stroke.

In 2023, the Heart Foundation issued a position statement on alcohol, noting that any level of consumption can increase the risk of high blood pressure, heart disease and stroke, including conditions such as atrial fibrillation. The statement clarifies that there is no safe level of alcohol consumption for heart health and advises that people who do not drink should not start, while those who do drink should reduce their intake to minimise cardiovascular risk.

== Research ==
The Heart Foundation is New Zealand's leading independent funder of heart research. Their funding enables medical researchers and cardiologists to undertake research projects and specialist training.

=== A World-first Pacemaker ===
A outcome of research the Heart Foundation has helped fund is the development of a world-first "natural" or "bionic" pacemaker at the University of Auckland. Unlike traditional steady-beat devices, this pacemaker mimics the heart's natural rhythm by syncing with the person’s breathing.

=== Heart Foundation Chair of Heart Health ===
Heart Foundation donors funded a Chair of Heart Health position at Auckland University. The Chair, filled by Professor Rob Doughty, was established to create a research hub to focus on improving understanding of heart disease, and to help improve heart health for New Zealanders.

=== Heart disease and mental illness study ===
In 2017 the Heart Foundation funded a two-year study into the link between heart disease and mental illness, to be carried out by Professor Bart Ellenbroek and his research team at Victoria University, Wellington.

=== Polypill study ===
The Heart Foundation of New Zealand, with other organisations including the British Heart Foundation and the Wellcome Trust, funded research published in 2011 into the use of a polypill to reduce the risk of heart attack and stroke.

== Care and support ==
The Heart Foundation holds heart-help sessions that offer support and advice from guest speakers including health professionals. These sessions are run by regionally-based Heart Foundation staff.

== Heart Foundation Home Lottery ==
The Heart Foundation runs a house lottery as a fundraiser. It began on 26 December 1993. Jennian Homes is the partner of the Heart Foundation Home Lottery.

== Heart Foundation Tick ==
The Heart Foundation Tick programme was used to help New Zealanders find healthy food choices. The programme ran for 25 years and was retired in 2016. An achievement of the Tick programme was its success in working with food companies to reduce the amount of salt in processed food products.

== Modern Digital Health Tools ==
The Heart Foundation launched My Heart Check in 2020, an online tool developed using New Zealand-specific data to help individuals assess their heart age and risk of having a heart attack or stroke. By early 2025, over 51,000 risk assessments had been completed via the platform.

== Heart Foundation Food Reformulation Programme ==
The Heart Foundation’s Food Reformulation Programme, established in 2007, is a voluntary initiative that collaborates with the food industry to reduce sodium and sugar levels in everyday foods in New Zealand. As of 2025, the Programme is estimated to remove approximately 335 tonnes of salt and 760 tonnes of sugar from targeted food categories each year. Notable achievements include a 29% reduction in the average salt content of packaged bread and a 39% reduction in sugar across top-selling yoghurt brands.

== Funded treatment for heart failure patients ==
The Heart Foundation's call for wider access to a heart medication was successful, with Pharmac announcing in November 2024 that it will fund a drug used in the treatment of chronic heart failure, a move that will benefit more than 18,000 New Zealanders over the next 12 months.

== Tohu Manawa Ora | Healthy Heart Award ==
The Heart Foundation runs the Tohu Manawa Ora | Healthy Heart Award programme, which has been shown to significantly impact the health and wellbeing of hundreds of thousands of pre-schoolers across New Zealand. A recent report highlighted a significant social return on investment (SROI) for the programme, showing that for every dollar invested in the programme there is a social return of $4.50.

== See also ==
- National Heart Foundation of Australia
