= Red meat =

Meat from mammals such as beef, pork, and lamb

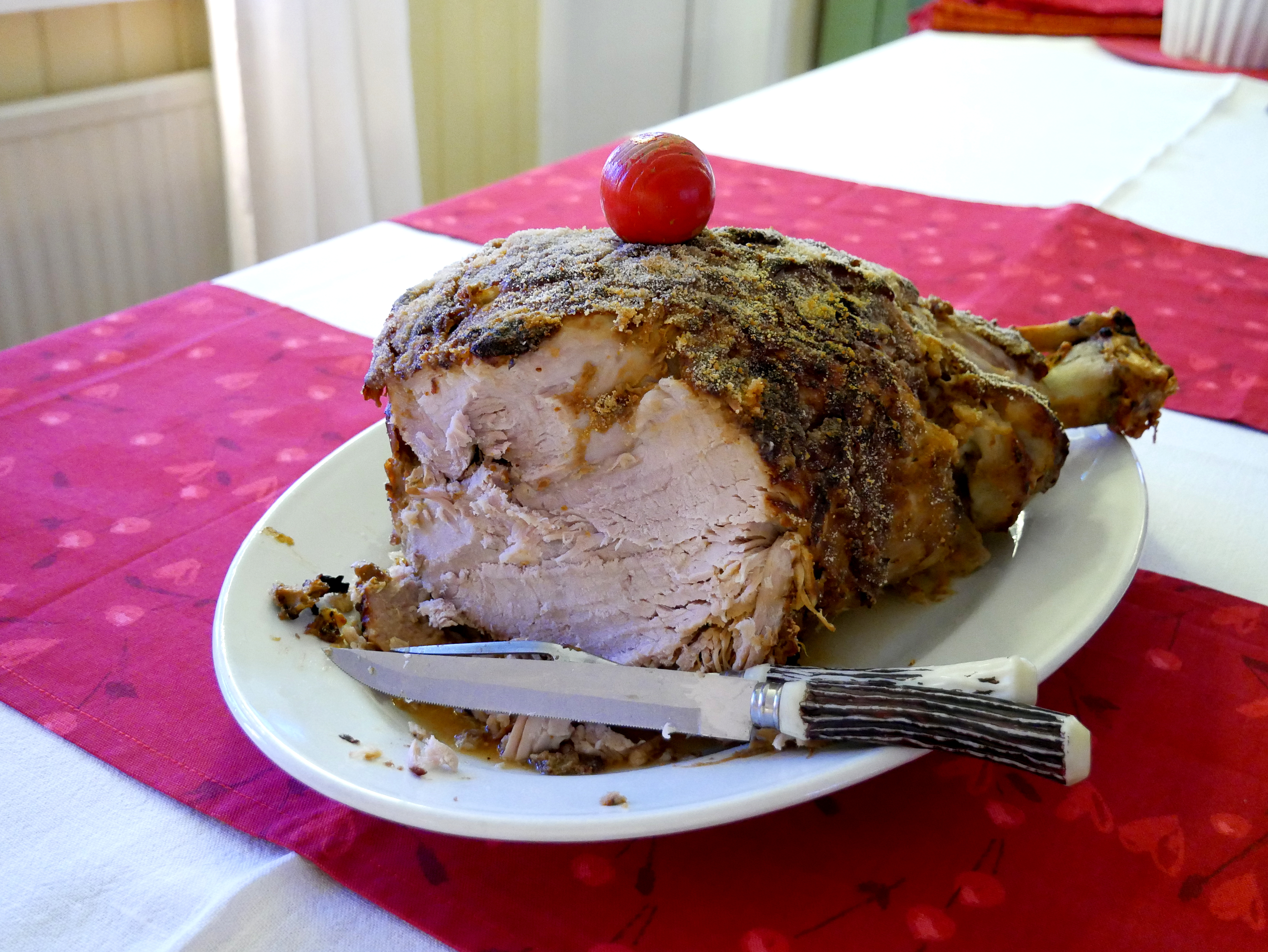
Pork is a type of red meat even though it can appear white or pink.

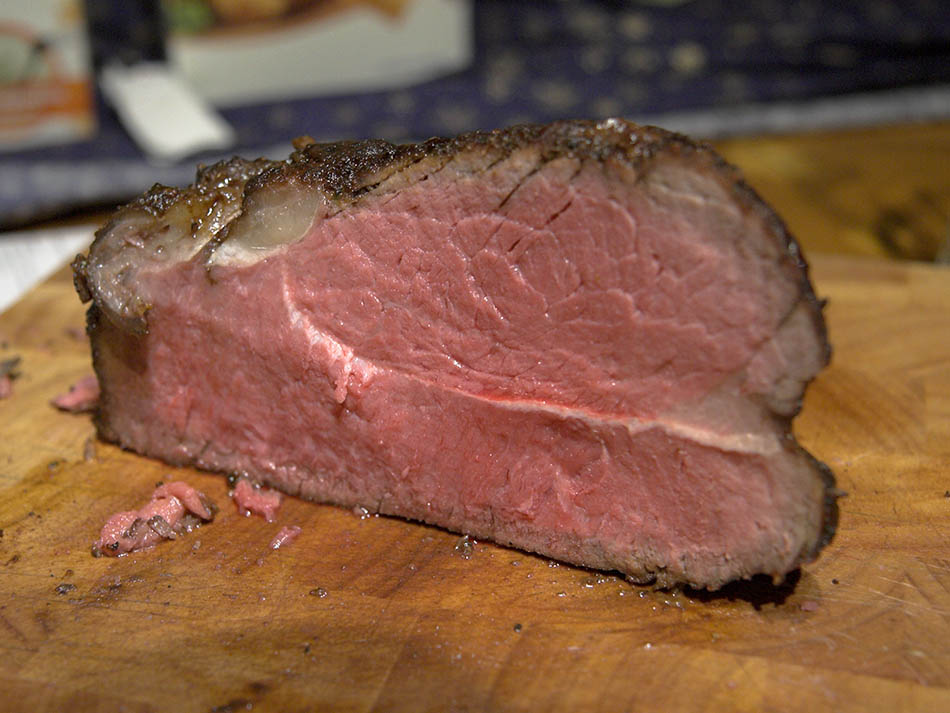
Roast beef is a darker brown color.

In the context of nutrition, red meat is defined as meat obtained from mammals, including beef, pork, lamb/mutton, veal, and venison. Red meat does not necessarily appear red in color. In culinary contexts, the term red meat is used more loosely to refer to meat that is red when raw.

From a nutritional perspective, red meat can be a good source of protein, iron, zinc, and vitamins B1, B2, B6, and B12. However, red meat has been associated with a number of non-nutritional health impacts. According to the International Agency for Research on Cancer (IARC), unprocessed red meat probably causes cancer, particularly colorectal cancer. Studies have also linked red meat with higher risks of cardiovascular disease and type 2 diabetes. If meat is processed, such as by salting, curing, or smoking, health risks further increase. Processed meat is known to cause colorectal cancer. The World Cancer Research Fund recommends minimizing consumption of processed meat and limiting red meat to no more than three portions per week, which is equivalent to about 350–500g (12–18oz) cooked weight.

Most red meat comes from farmed animals, such as cattle, sheep and pork, which are produced as part of industrial agriculture. Increased demand for red meat, especially in wealthy and emerging economies, has been a major driver of many of the negative environmental impacts of animal agriculture. Most research on the impact of food on health and environment recommends a significant reduction in meat consumption is essential to mitigate climate change and avoid the worst impacts of the biodiversity loss.

== Definition ==
Concentration of myoglobin by percentage of mass
| Name | Myoglobin | USDA category |
|---|---|---|
| Aged beef | 1.50 – 2.00% | Red meat |
| Beef | 0.40 – 1.00% | Red meat |
| Pork | 0.10 – 0.30% | Red meat |
| Veal | 0.10 – 0.30% | Red meat |
| Turkey thigh | 0.25 – 0.30% | Dark meat |
| Chicken thigh | 0.18 – 0.20% | Dark meat |
| Turkey breast | 0.008% | White meat |
| Chicken breast | 0.005% | White meat |

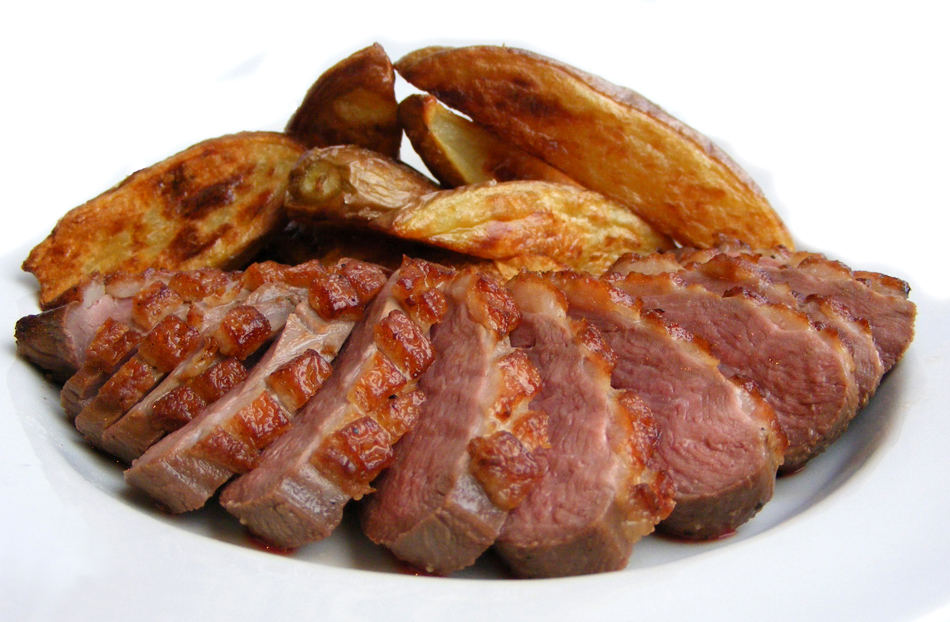
Duck can have a red appearance. However, studies on the health effects of red meat do not consider duck or any type of poultry to be red meat.

In the context of nutritional science, red meat is defined as meat obtained from mammals, including beef, pork, lamb, mutton, veal, venison, and goat. Some sources also specify that the meat must be muscle meat, as opposed to organ meat. Red meat does not necessarily appear red in color.

In culinary contexts, the term red meat is used more loosely to refer to meat that is red when raw. The term is used to refer to adult or "gamey" mammals, while that from young mammals (rabbit, veal, lamb) is white. Most poultry is white. Game is sometimes put in a separate category altogether (French: viandes noires 'dark meats'). The redness of meat comes from its myoglobin content.

Some cuts of pork are considered white under the gastronomic definition, but all pork is considered red meat in nutritional studies. The National Pork Board has positioned it as "the other white meat", profiting from the ambiguity to suggest that pork has the nutritional properties of white meat, which is considered more healthful.

Ostrich, emu, and rhea meat are sometimes referred to as types of red meat or "alternatives to red meat" . However, their nutritional characteristics differ significantly from the characteristics of other types of red meat.

== Nutrition ==
Red meat contains large amounts of iron, creatine, minerals such as zinc and phosphorus, and B-vitamins: (niacin, vitamin B_{12}, thiamin and riboflavin). Red meat is a source of lipoic acid.

Red meat contains small amounts of vitamin D. Offal such as liver contains much higher quantities than other parts of the animal.

== Health effects ==
Overall, diets high in red and processed meats are associated with an increased risk of type 2 diabetes (T2D), cardiovascular disease (CVD), cancer (particularly colorectal cancer), and all-cause mortality. The body of epidemiological data showing their associations with T2D, CVD, and cancer is large and consistent.

The associations are strongest for processed meat, which is meat that has undergone salting, curing, fermentation, smoking, or other processes to enhance flavor or improve preservation, such as bacon, ham, salami, pepperoni, hot dogs, and some sausages.

A 2025 umbrella review found that a high intake of red meat is associated with an increased all-cause mortality risk.

There are no long-term randomized controlled trials that have investigated red meat consumption and disease outcomes, and such trials are unlikely to be conducted due to ethical, financial and practical reasons. Most of the data on red meat and health effects is from long-term epidemiological studies.

=== Cancer ===
In 2015, the International Agency for Research on Cancer (IARC) classified unprocessed red meat as "probably carcinogenic to humans (Group 2A)". To make this classification, the IARC Working Group assessed over 800 epidemiological studies in addition to other types of studies such as animal bioassays. When assessing whether substances are carcinogenic to humans, it is rare for data from randomized trials to be available.

The Working Group found "limited" epidemiological evidence linking unprocessed red meat to colorectal, pancreatic, and prostate cancer. Additionally, it found "strong mechanistic evidence" that unprocessed red meat is carcinogenic. Mechanistic evidence is evidence of plausible biological pathways in which a substance could cause cancer. For instance, studies had found that participants who had recently eaten red meat had higher levels of carcinogenic N-nitroso compounds in their guts and feces.

For processed red meat, evidence of harm is stronger. The IARC classified processed meat as carcinogenic to humans (Group 1), based on "sufficient evidence in humans that the consumption of processed meat causes colorectal cancer."

The American Institute for Cancer Research, Cancer Research UK and World Cancer Research Fund International have supported these conclusions. More recent meta-analyses have further supported the finding that high consumption of red meat is associated with increased risk of gastrointestinal cancer.

==== Increase in cancer risk ====
The IARC concluded that if unprocessed red meat does cause cancer, there is a 17% higher risk of colorectal cancer for every 100 g of unprocessed red meat consumed daily. It found an 18% higher risk of colorectal cancer for every 50 g of processed red meat consumed daily.

A 2021 umbrella review reported an increase of 11–51% risk of multiple cancer per 100g/d increment of red meat, and an increase of 8–72% risk of multiple cancer per 50g/d increment of processed meat.

A 2022 Burden of Proof study analyzed data from epidemiological evidence (not mechanistic evidence) and found that each 100 g of unprocessed red meat consumed per day would increase colorectal cancer risk by at least 6% and breast cancer by at least 3%. The Burden of Proof methodology was later criticized for systematically under-estimating levels of risk.

==== Mechanisms ====
Heme iron (or "haem iron”) in red meat has been associated with increased colorectal cancer risk. The American Institute for Cancer Research and World Cancer Research Fund have commented that "haem iron, which is present at high levels in red meat, has been shown to promote colorectal tumorigenesis by stimulating the endogenous formation of carcinogenic N-nitroso compound." N-Glycolylneuraminic acid (Neu5Gc) has also been suggested as a mechanism.

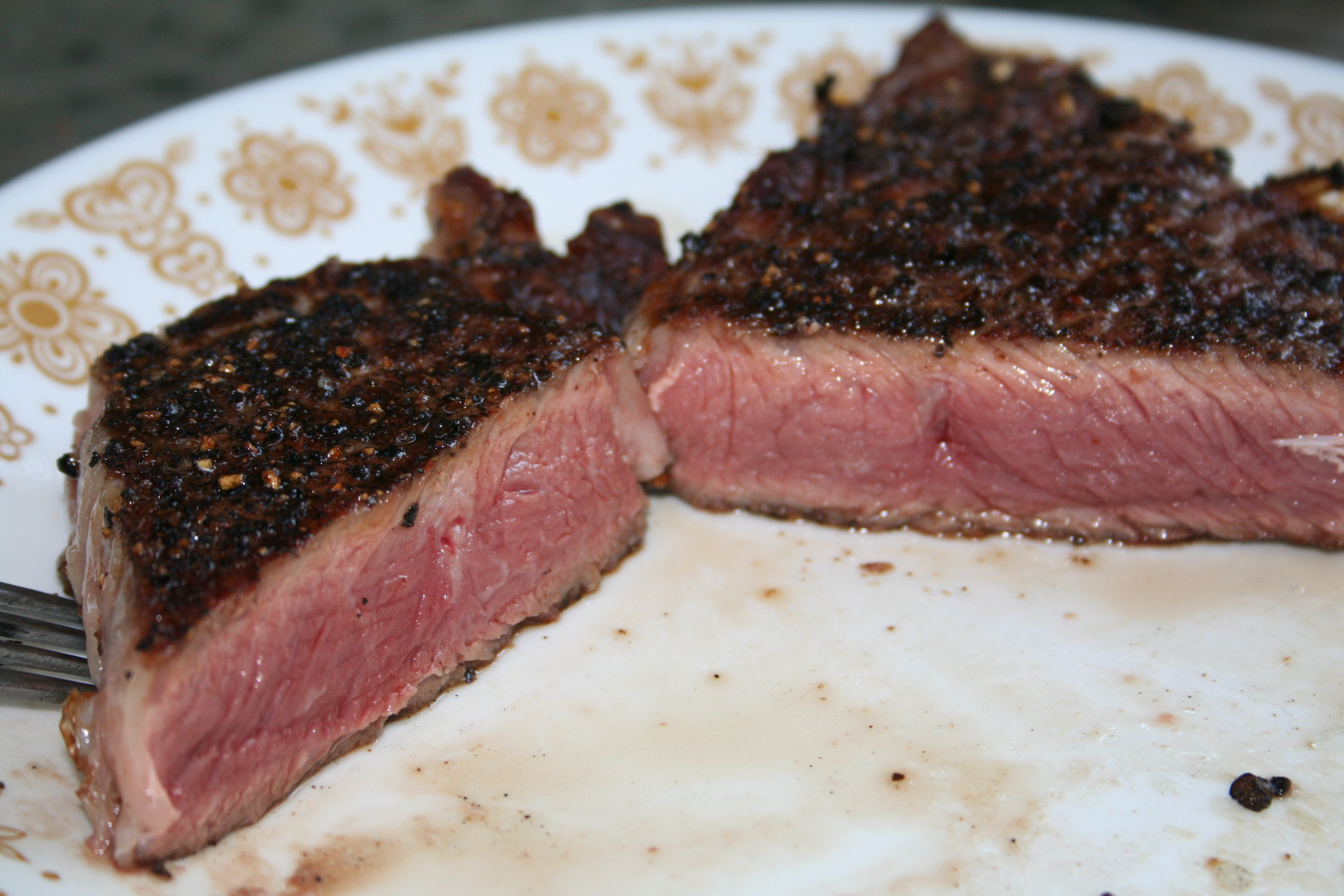
Meat with a dark exterior, common in high temperature cooking

A 2017 literature review indicated there are numerous potential carcinogens of colorectal tissue in red meat, particularly those in processed red meat products, such as N-nitroso compounds, polycyclic aromatic hydrocarbons (PAHs), and heterocyclic amines (HCAs). Cooking meat with "high-temperature methods, such as pan frying or grilling directly over an open flame", also causes formation of PAHs and HCAs.

==== Cooking methods ====
Meats cooked at high temperatures, especially above 300 °F (149 °C) (as in grilling or pan frying), or that are cooked for a long time tend to form more HCAs. Cooking methods that expose meat to smoke contribute to PAH formation. Using a microwave oven to cook meat prior to exposure to high temperatures can substantially reduce HCA formation by reducing the time that meat must be in contact with high heat to finish cooking.

Meat that is cooked longer and at higher temperatures is associated with a 4.62 times greater risk of breast cancer compared with rare or medium-done meat.

=== Cardiovascular disease ===
Red meat consumption is associated with an increased risk of coronary heart disease, high blood pressure and stroke. Factors associated with increased stroke risk from consuming red meat include saturated fats that increase levels of blood cholesterol, LDL cholesterol, triglycerides, and heme iron, which may precipitate atherogenesis in cerebral arteries, leading to stroke. While it was thought that saturated fat was to blame, more recent research indicates that atherosclerosis is largely mediated by trimethylamine N-oxide (TMAO). This is produced by gut bacteria from compounds such as choline and carnitine in the meat. TMAO is also associated with colorectal cancer.

In 2020, the National Heart Foundation of New Zealand Expert Nutrition Policy (ENP) issued a position statement that concluded that high consumption of red meat increases risk of heart disease and stroke by 16%.

=== Diabetes ===
Processed and unprocessed red meat consumption is a risk factor for developing type 2 diabetes across populations.

A 2017 review found that daily consumption of 85 grams of red meat and 35 grams of processed red meat products by European and American consumers increased their risk of type 2 diabetes by 18–36%, while a diet of abstinence of red meat consuming whole grains, vegetables, fruits, and dairy was associated with an 81% reduced risk of diabetes. One study estimated that "substitutions of one serving of nuts, low-fat dairy, and whole grains per day for one serving of red meat per day were associated with a 16–35% lower risk of type 2 diabetes". A 2022 umbrella review found that consuming an additional 100g of red meat per day was associated with a 17% increased risk of type 2 diabetes.

=== Inflammatory bowel disease ===
High red and processed meat consumption is associated with an increased risk of inflammatory bowel disease. The American Gastroenterological Association have stated that a diet low in red and processed meat may reduce ulcerative colitis flares.

== Lobbying ==
=== Industry research funding ===
A 2025 review found that nutritional studies on red meat consumption funded by the meat industry reported favorable (20.7%) or neutral (79.3%) cardiovascular outcomes for red meat intake. This was in opposition to independent studies that reported unfavourable (73.3%) or neutral (26.7%) cardiovascular outcomes. The review concluded that "most studies without conflicts of interest with the red meat industry suggested an unfavorable effect of unprocessed red meat consumption on risk factors for cardiovascular disease".

== Guidelines ==
=== International guidelines ===
The World Cancer Research Fund recommends limiting red meat to no more than three servings per week.

The European Association for the Study of Diabetes recommends that diabetics minimise the consumption of red meat.

=== National guidelines ===
In 2011, the USDA launched MyPlate, which did not distinguish between kinds of meat, but did recommend eating at least 8 oz (230 g) of fish each week. In 2011, the Harvard School of Public Health launched the Healthy Eating Plate in part because of the perceived inadequacies of the USDA's recommendations. The Healthy Eating Plate encourages consumers to avoid processed meat and limit red meat consumption to twice a week because of links to heart disease, diabetes, and colon cancer. To replace these meats it recommends consuming fish, poultry, beans, or nuts.

The National Heart Foundation of New Zealand recommends that one should aim to reduce consumption of red meat below 350g per week and replace meat with plant sources of protein.

=== Environmental guidelines ===
Acknowledgement of the role of red meat in land use, agricultural pollution, biodiversity loss and climate change has led to multiple guidelines that combine environmental and human health. The planetary health diet based on the EAT-Lancet commission recommends a significant reduction of red meat in favor of vegetarian proteins and more sustainable meats.
