= Thomas Nelson Page House =

Historic house in Washington, D.C., United States

- U.S. National Register of Historic Places
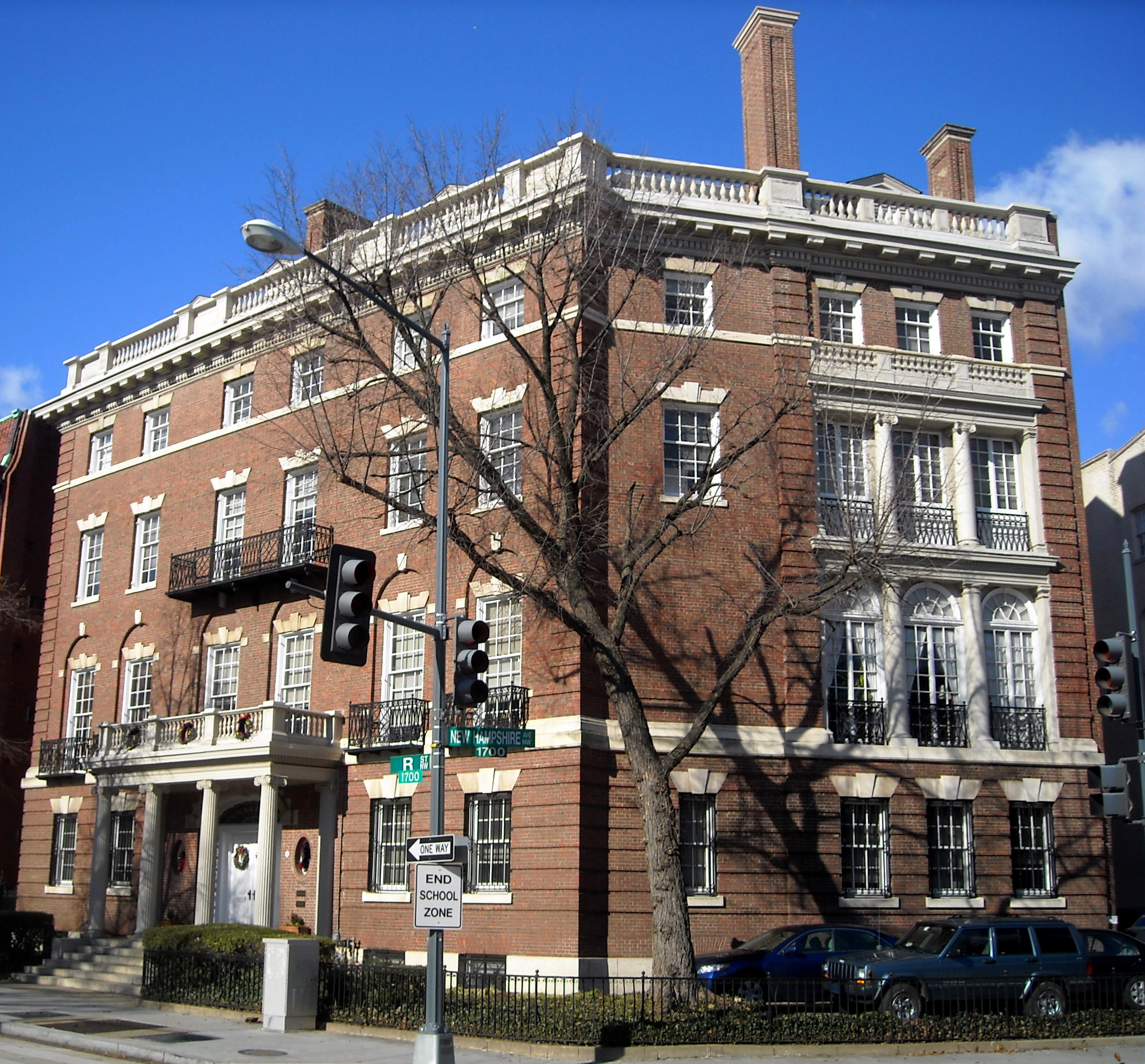

- Location within Washington, D.C.
- Location: 1759 R Street N.W. Washington, D.C.
- Coordinates: 38°54′46″N 77°2′28″W
- Built: 1896; 130 years ago
- Architect: Stanford White
- Architectural style: Georgian Revival
- NRHP reference No.: 75002053
- Added to NRHP: September 5, 1975

The Thomas Nelson Page House is an historic house located in the Dupont Circle neighborhood of Washington, D.C. It has been listed on the National Register of Historic Places since 1975. The building currently serves as headquarters for the American Institute for Cancer Research.

== History ==
The Georgian Revival mansion was designed by Stanford White of the prominent architectural firm of McKim, Mead & White. It is a notable example of an adaptation of 18th century English-American residential architecture with consideration given to late-19th century needs of space, scale and function. The residence was completed in 1896 for writer Thomas Nelson Page and his second wife, heiress Florence Lathrop Field Page. It was the center of Washington's literary and social life in late 19th and early 20th centuries. The contents of the house were put up for auction by C.G. Sloan & Co. of Washington, D.C. in 1923.

== Architecture ==
The 4 1/2-story mansion is situated on a polygonal corner site along a street with other imposing residences. The facades of the building are composed of Harvard brick timed in limestone and white-painted wood. The exterior features an Ionic portico, a fanlight doorway, a side loggia, a piano nobile with iron balconies and arcaded windows. The ceremonial interiors are arranged around an open stair hall. White was also the architect when the loggia was enclosed in 1903 to create vaulted garden room with lattice ceiling.

== See also ==
- National Register of Historic Places listings in the upper NW Quadrant of Washington, D. C.
