= Planetary health diet =

Flexitarian diet

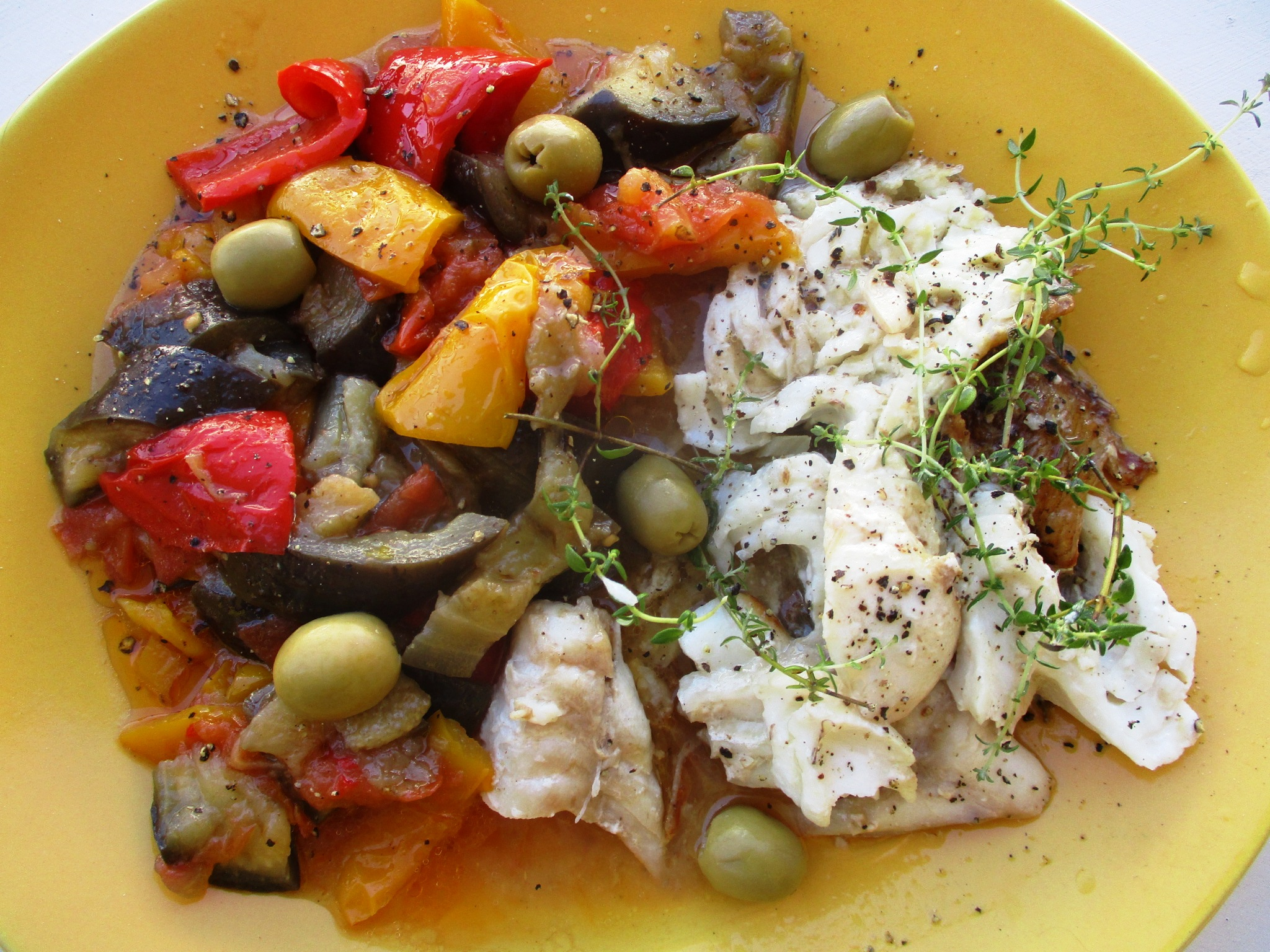
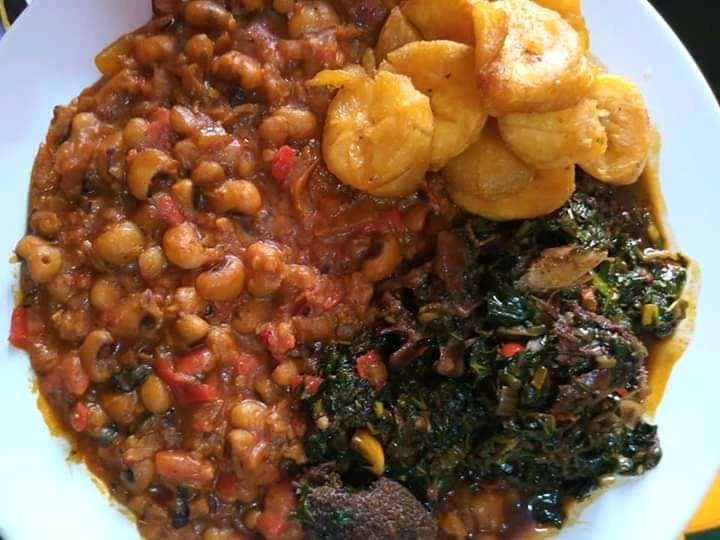
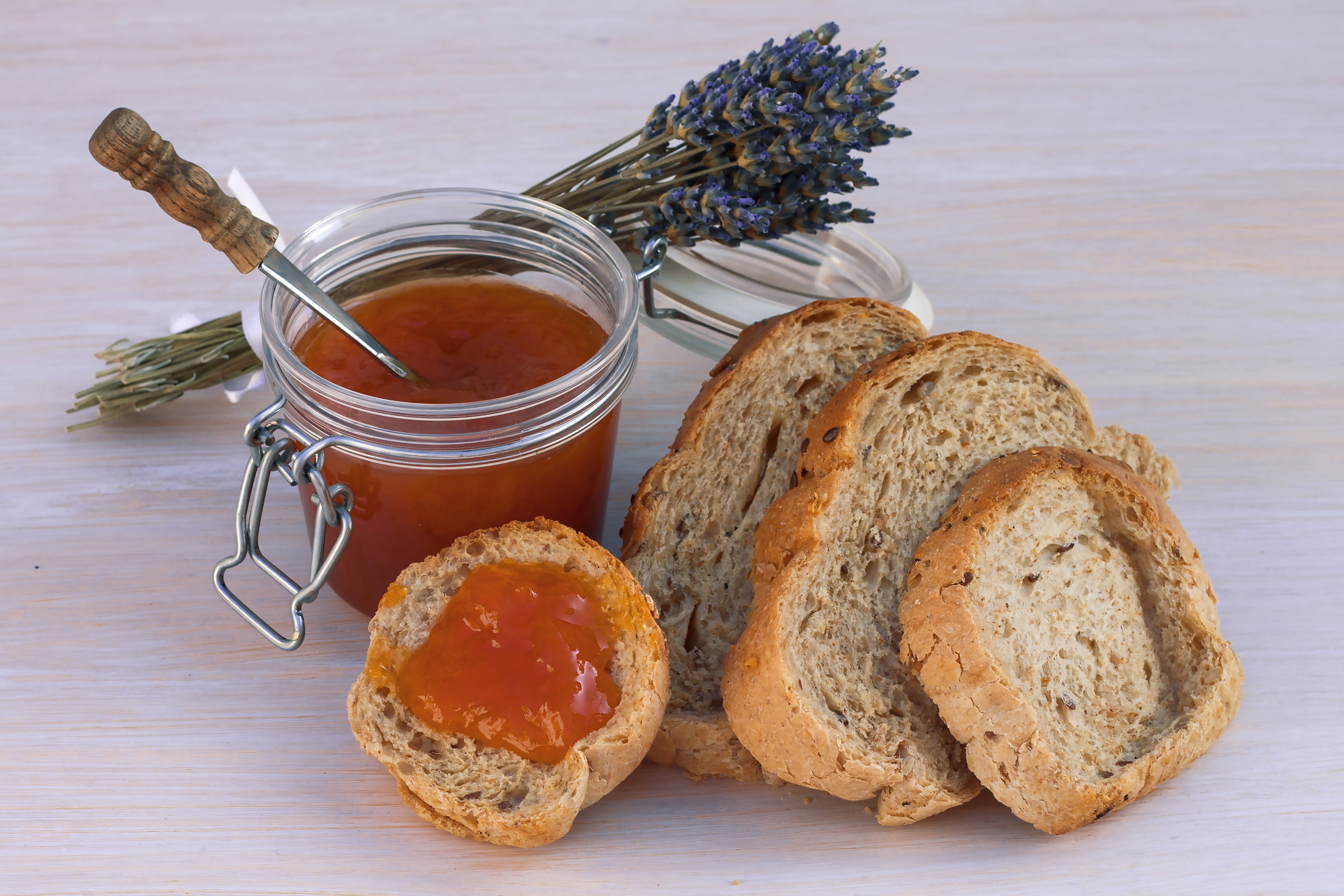
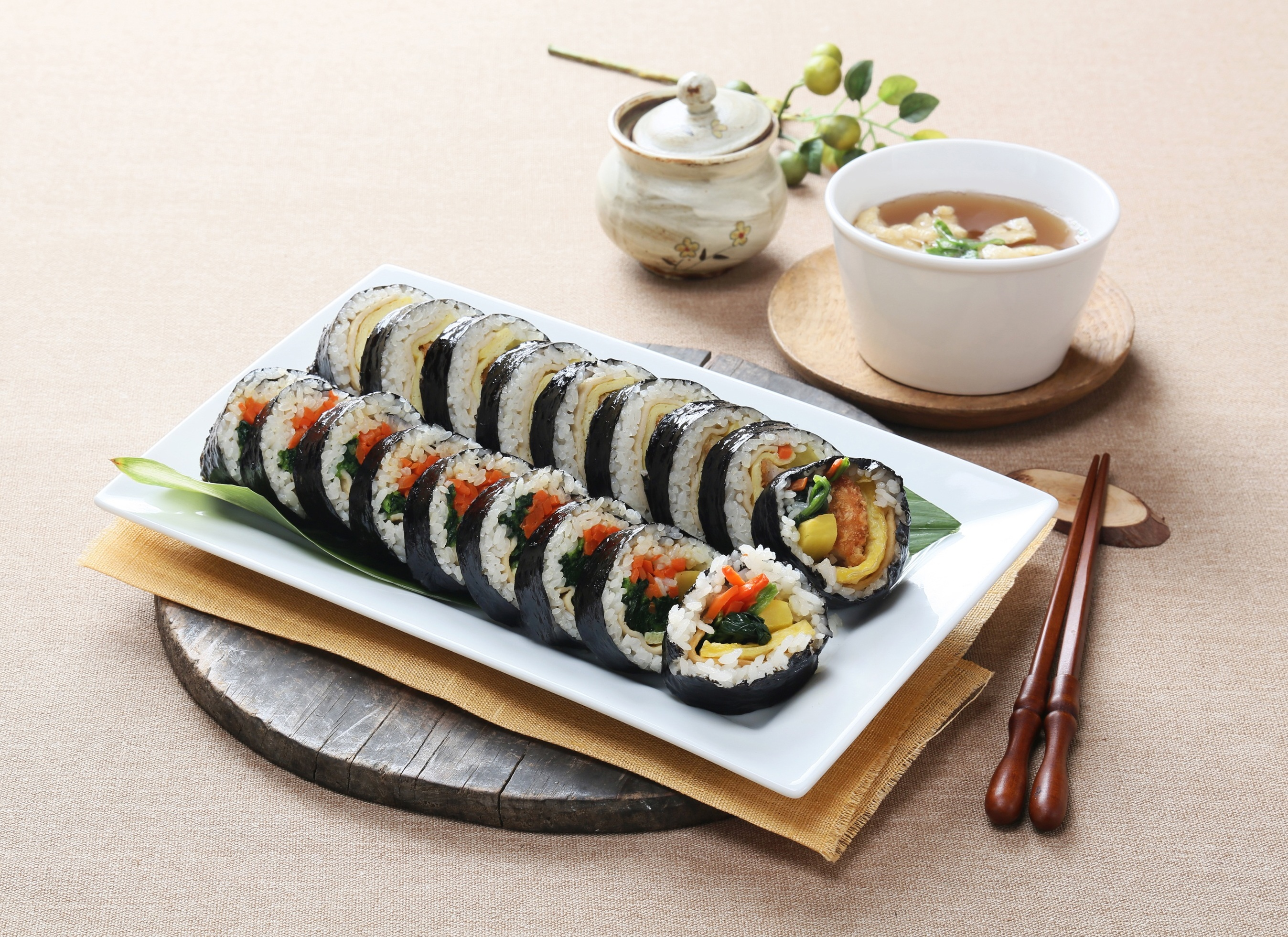
The planetary health diet can include a wide range of whole foods and cooking traditions. Shown here: Provençal ratatouille and fish, Nigerian beans and spinach with plantain, Macedonian whole wheat bread with apricot jam, Korean gimbap.

The planetary health diet (PHD), also called the EAT-Lancet diet, Lancet diet, planetary diet, or planetarian diet, is a diet designed to be healthy, adaptable to diverse cultures, and environmentally sustainable for a world population of up to 10 billion people.

The PHD is a flexitarian diet consisting largely of plant-based foods: vegetables, fruits, whole grains, legumes, nuts, and unsaturated oils. It includes moderate amounts of fish and shellfish, poultry, dairy, and eggs. Red meat (beef, lamb, and pork) is included in small quantities. Processed meat, highly processed foods, added sugars, refined grains, and starchy vegetables are minimized.

Since poor diets are a major cause of health problems and death, the report estimated that universal adoption of the PHD would prevent 11 million deaths per year, largely by preventing coronary heart disease, stroke, type-2 diabetes, some cancers, and other diseases. In high-income countries the PHD is generally affordable and studies indicate that it does not need to cost more than typical diets for those countries. However, it has been estimated that at least 1.58 billion people in low- and middle-income countries would not be able to afford the PHD.

The diet was created by the EAT-Lancet commission as part of a report released in The Lancet on 16 January 2019. An update to the diet was published in 2025. The PHD was largely well-received by the academic community. In social media discussion and in the media, responses to the report were highly polarised and the report became framed as a culture war issue. Evidence later emerged that a public relations firm working with the Animal Agricultural Alliance had organised a backlash against the PHD.

== Definition, composition ==
The PHD is largely a plant-based diet consisting of vegetables, fruits, whole grains, legumes, nuts, and unsaturated oils (olive, soybean, canola, sunflower, and peanut oil). It optionally includes moderate amounts of fish and shellfish, poultry, dairy products, and eggs.

Red meat (beef, lamb, and pork) can be included in small quantities, which is why it is called flexitarian. Processed meat, highly processed foods, added sugars, refined grains, and starchy vegetables such as potatoes are minimized.

Globally, the report calls for a more than 50% reduction in "unhealthy foods, such as red meat and sugar." Red meat is associated with higher risk of cardiovascular disease, diabetes, and some cancers. Global adoption of the diet would entail more than doubling the global consumption of nuts, fruits, vegetables, and legumes.

A 2020 comparison study found agreements between the planetary diet and the 2015-2020 Dietary Guidelines for Americans. The differences are in the recommended amounts of fruit, nuts, red meat, seeds, starchy vegetables and whole grains.

As of 2023 several studies have proposed variations of the PHD that are adapted to different cultures and regions. For instance, a variation of the PHD has been created for Denmark and a different one for Italy. In 2024, lower-calorie versions of the diet have also been created for those who are trying to lose weight.

Scientific targets for a planetary health diet, with possible ranges, for an intake of 2500 kcal/day.
Food	Macronutrient intake (grams per day) (possible range)	Caloric intake (kcal per day)	Example
Whole grains	232	811	
Unsaturated oils	40 (20–80)	354	
Dairy foods	250 (0–500)	153	One cup of milk per day
Fruits	200 (100–300)	126	
Added sugars	31	120	Two tablespoons of honey per day
Vegetables	300 (200–600)	78	
Palm oil	6.8 (0–6.8)	60	
Tubers or Starchy vegetables	50 (0–100)	39	Two medium-sized potatoes or servings of cassava per week
Lard or tallow	5 (0 to 5)	36	
Protein sources:
Legumes	75 (0–100)	284	
Nuts	50 (0–75)	291	
Chicken and other poultry	29	62	One boneless, skinless chicken thigh every other day
Fish	28	40	
Beef, lamb and pork	14	30	One medium-size hamburger per week
Eggs	13	19	One egg every third day (e.g., poached, made into pancakes, etc.)

Comparison of current intake by world region compared with the recommended planetary health diet. In the SVG file, tap or hover over a bar to show its corresponding value in grams.

== History ==
The EAT-Lancet Commission was an independent scientific body consisting of 19 commissioners and 18 co-authors. Commission members came from 16 countries, working in the fields of health, agriculture, political science, and environmental science.

The commission was tasked with using the best available evidence to determine a universal reference diet that is healthy for both humans and the planet, minimising chronic disease risks and maximising human wellbeing. The diet is intended for individuals aged 2 years and above who are generally healthy, and is designed to be adaptable for all regions and culinary traditions of the world.

Combined with improved agricultural production practices and a 50% reduction in food waste and loss, the Commission estimated that this diet would provide healthy nutrition to 10 billion people, the projected population of the Earth in 2050, and be environmentally sustainable. The report assessed environmental sustainability using the planetary boundaries framework, considering the effects of the food system on climate change, land systems change, freshwater use, biodiversity loss, and nitrogen and phosphorus cycling. The global food system is responsible for 25% to 30% of greenhouse gas emissions. Agriculture takes up 70% of global freshwater use and half of the world's habitable land surface.

== Health effects ==
The EAT-Lancet report estimated that if the PHD were universally adopted, 11.1 million deaths per year would be prevented. This would be accomplished largely by preventing coronary heart disease, stroke, type-2 diabetes, some cancers, and other diseases. The PHD would also reduce rates of child stunting, which is common in low-income countries.

A 2024 review of 28 studies found that the PHD was significantly associated with lower rates of diabetes, cardiovascular disease, cancer and all-cause mortality. Some studies found that a PHD could be deficient in certain micronutrients. Vitamin and mineral supplements are not explicitly part of the PHD, but the report indicates they can sometimes be necessary. For instance, the report recommends iron supplements for adolescent girls who do not eat meat.

A 2025 meta-analysis found that higher adherence to the PHD was associated with lower all-cause mortality and a reduced cancer risk in participants from NHANES and UK Biobank.

== Present dietary situation ==
Eat lancet diet comparison

Poor diets are a major cause of health problems and death, due to both inadequate consumption of nutritious foods and excess consumption of harmful ones. Globally, approximately 800 million people are undernourished, around 2 billion adults are overweight or obese, and over 2 billion people have micronutrient deficiencies.

== Cost ==
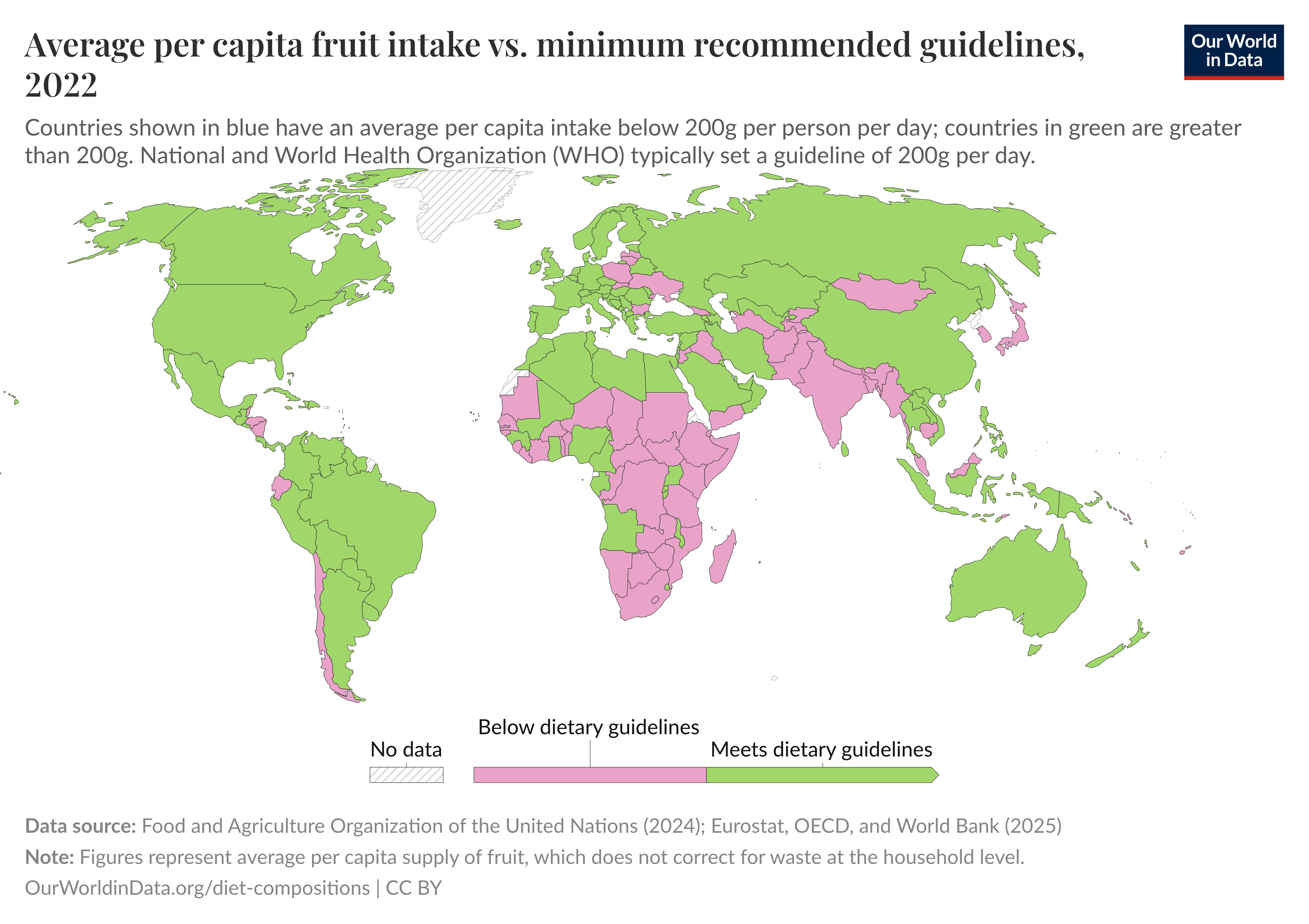
The countries shown in pink consume less fruit than recommended by the PHD and other dietary guidelines. Fruit is often difficult to afford for people with low incomes.

An IFPRI and Tufts University study found that based on 2011 food prices, the minimum daily cost of the PHD would range from around $2.42 in low-income countries to $2.66 in high-income countries.

These costs are affordable for most of the world, but exceed household income for at least 1.58 billion people. The PHD recommends larger quantities of relatively expensive food groups such as dairy, eggs, meat, fish, fruits, and vegetables in place of the high-starch foods that typically dominate the diets of the very poor. The study also found that the PHD was about 60% more expensive than the cheapest diet that would provide adequate nutrition.

In high-income countries, the minimum daily cost of the PHD is less than that of a typical diet for those countries. However, in high-income countries, the cost and availability of healthy food varies significantly between regions. In Mexico, a study found that people who followed PHD-like diets tended to have lower food costs.

The EAT-Lancet report spurred discussions on how changes to government policies could be used to make healthy diets more affordable. In India, for instance, nearly all food subsidies target rice and wheat, but could be shifted or broadened to cover more nutrient-dense foods.

== Response ==
Social media discussion of the EAT-Lancet report was polarised. Analysis of Twitter activity indicates that opposition to the EAT-Lancet report was organized before the report's release in January 2019. The online counter-movement used the hashtag #yestomeat and focused on the report's recommendation to reduce global meat consumption. The #yestomeat hashtag was not used at all until January 14, 2019. At that point, which was three days before the EAT-Lancet report was released, the hashtag started to appear in hundreds of tweets each day.

Evidence later emerged that the Twitter backlash against the EAT-Lancet report had been instigated by a public relations company called Red Flag on behalf of the Animal Agriculture Alliance. Red Flag also encouraged academics, journalists, and the Institute of Economic Affairs to portray the EAT-Lancet report as "radical", "out of touch" and "hypocritical". Environmental scientist Jennifer Jacquet commented that "Red Flag turned EAT-Lancet into a culture war issue."

Media coverage was also divided. The UK newspaper The Guardian and the US news outlet CNN have given the diet positive coverage. Harry Harris, writing in New Statesman, was wary of claims that the diet could transform the world's food system.

The World Health Organization withdrew its sponsorship of an EAT-Lancet event following criticism from Gian Lorenzo Cornado, Italy's Permanent Representative to the United Nations Office at Geneva. Cornado said that adopting one dietary approach for the whole planet would destroy traditional diets and cultural heritage, and that reducing meat and candy consumption would cause the loss of millions of jobs.

Sixteen cities from the C40 Cities Climate Leadership Group, including New York, Seoul, and Milan, have committed to using the PHD to guide municipal food policies.

Academic reception of the 2019 EAT-Lancet report was generally positive. Studies praised the report for providing quantified science-based recommendations that could guide the development of food policies. The most common criticism was the report's lack of attention to socioeconomic issues such as cultural food preferences and agricultural jobs.
