= Sid the Slug =

Advertising character

A poster from the advertising campaign

Sid the Slug is an advertising character created by the Food Standards Agency (FSA) in the United Kingdom in 2004 as the mascot of the "Salt - Watch it" campaign to warn the public of the risks of excessive salt consumption.

The multimedia campaign, including advertising hoardings, television commercials and Internet coverage, was based on the premise that salt kills slugs, and can harm humans too. The Salt Manufacturers' Association filed a complaint to the Advertising Standards Authority, their complaint being that the information presented was misleading. The Advertising Standards Authority did not uphold the SMA complaint in its adjudication.

The ASA had to deal with another complaint from a member of the public, that the use of the name "Sid" was offensive; this was also rejected, with the ASA instead arguing that most people would find it "humorous".

A member of the public complained to the FSA that the Welsh subtitles in the "Sid the Slug" TV advertisements meant the FSA was not treating English and Welsh equally, as is required by the FSA Welsh Language Scheme. The FSA replied that the animation could not have been dubbed into Welsh successfully, hence the subtitles. However, the FSA accepted that it had not complied with advertising conduct, as set by the Welsh Language Board.
