= Processed meat =

Type of meat

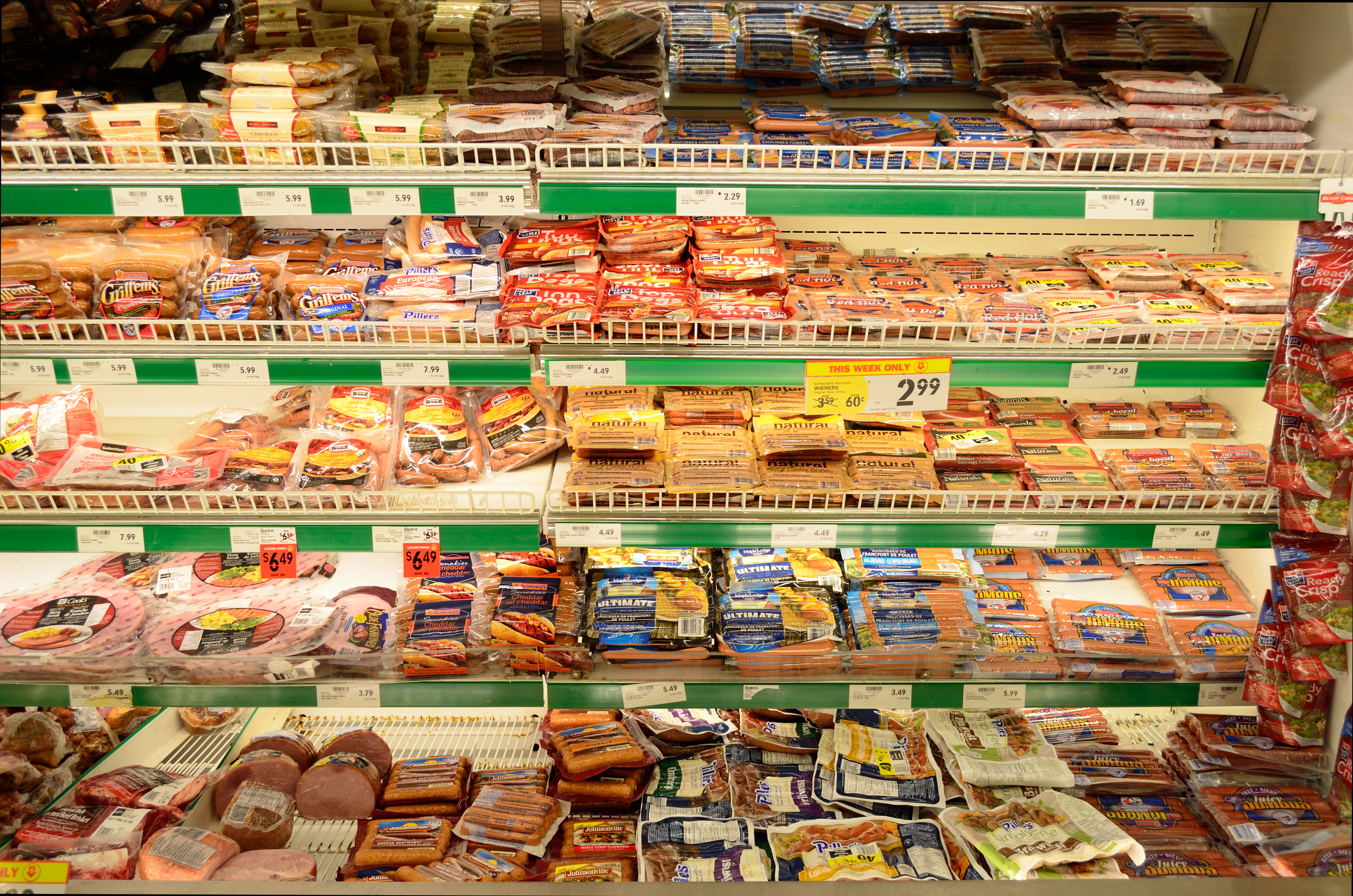
Various types of processed meat for sale at a supermarket

Processed meat is considered to be any meat that has been modified in order to either improve its taste or to extend its shelf life. Methods of meat processing include salting, curing, fermentation, smoking, and the addition of chemical preservatives. Processed meat is frequently made from pork or beef, but also poultry and others. It can contain meat by-products such as blood. Processed meat products include bacon, ham, sausages, salami, corned beef, jerky, hot dogs, lunch meat, canned meat, chicken nuggets, and meat-based sauces. Meat processing includes all the processes that change fresh meat, with the exception of simple mechanical processes such as cutting, grinding or mixing.

Meat processing began as soon as people realized that cooking and salting helps to preserve fresh meat. It is not known when this took place; however, the process of salting and sun-drying was recorded in Ancient Egypt, while using ice and snow is credited to early Romans, and canning was developed by Nicolas Appert who in 1810 received a prize for his invention from the French government. Medical health organizations advise people to limit processed meat consumption as it increases risk of some forms of cancer, cardiovascular disease, and Alzheimer's disease.

== Definition ==
The American Institute for Cancer Research and World Cancer Research Fund define processed meat as "meat preserved by smoking, curing or salting, or addition of chemical preservatives".

The Encyclopedia of Meat Sciences defined processed meat as "any meat preserved by smoking, curing, or salting, or with the addition of chemical preservatives; examples include bacon, salami, sausages, hot dogs, or processed deli, or luncheon meats".

== Preservatives ==
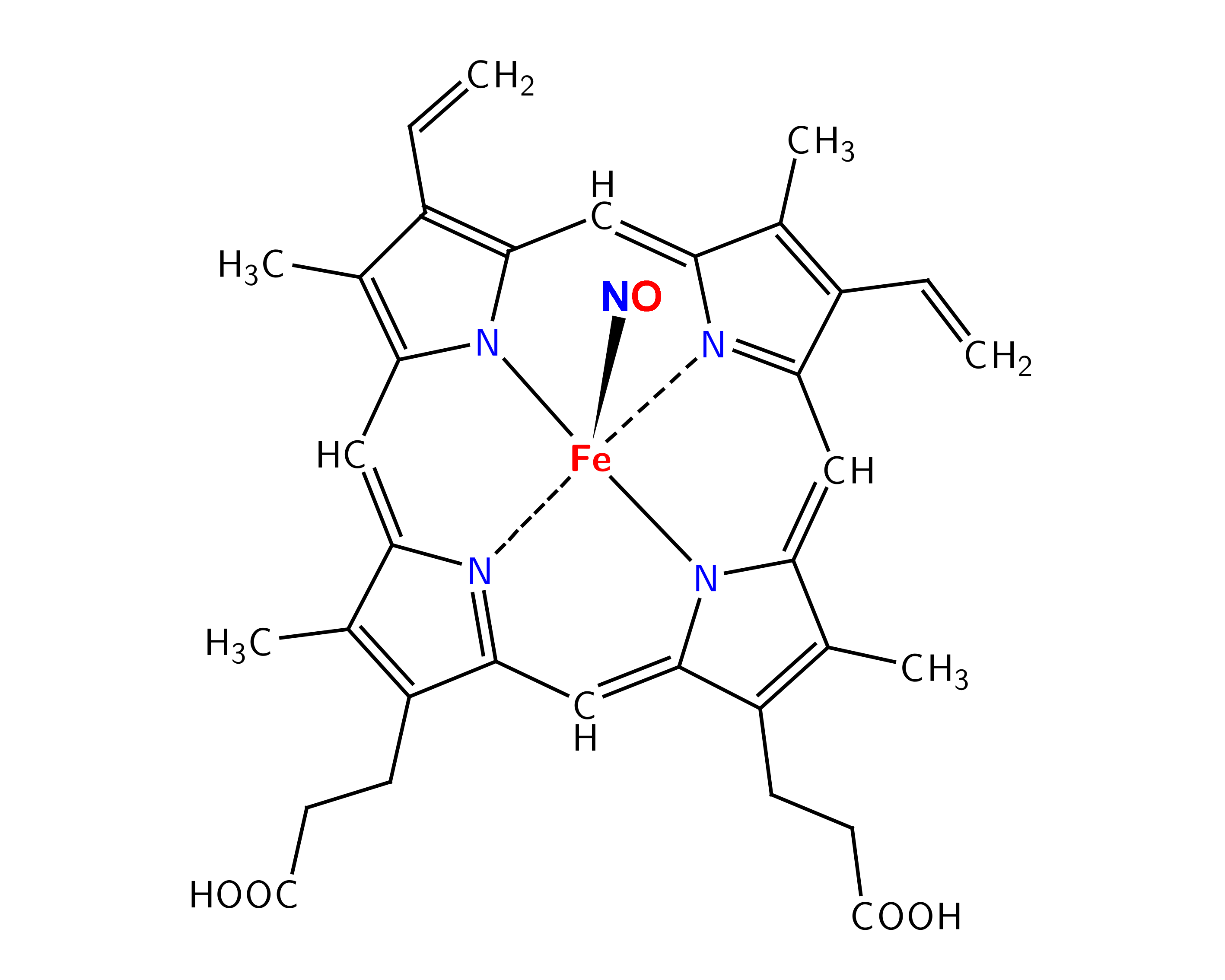
Nitrosyl-heme

Nitrate and sodium nitrite found in processed meats can be converted by the human body into nitrosamines that can be carcinogenic, causing mutation in the colorectal cell line, thereby causing tumorigenesis and eventually leading to cancer. Processed meat is more carcinogenic compared to unprocessed red meat because of the abundance of potent nitrosyl-heme molecules that form N-nitroso compounds.

A principal concern about sodium nitrite is Nitrosation/nitrosylation, the formation of carcinogenic nitroso-compounds in meats containing sodium nitrite or potassium nitrate, especially nitrosyl heme. In addition to nitrosyl-heme, carcinogenic nitrosamines can be formed from the reaction of nitrite with secondary amines under acidic conditions (such as occurs in the human stomach) as well as during the curing process used to preserve meats.

Nitrate and nitrite are consumed from plant foods as well as animal foods, with 80% of a typical person's nitrate consumption coming from vegetables, especially leafy and root vegetables such as spinach and beets. Some nitrate is converted to nitrite in the human body. Nitrate and nitrite are classified as generally recognized as safe (GRAS) by the U.S. Food and Drug Administration, and are not directly carcinogenic. Yet, when nitrate or nitrite interacts with certain components in meat, such as heme iron, amines, and amides, it can form nitroso compounds, which may contribute to the association between consumption of processed meats and higher incidence of colorectal cancer.

== Health effects ==
The International Agency for Research on Cancer (IARC) at the World Health Organization (WHO) classifies processed meat as Group 1 (carcinogenic to humans), because the IARC has found sufficient evidence that consumption of processed meat by humans causes colorectal cancer.

A 2016 report by the American Institute for Cancer Research and the World Cancer Research Fund found that processed meat consumption also increases the risk of stomach cancer.

In 2020, the American Cancer Society stated that "it is not known if there is a safe level of consumption for either red or processed meats. In the absence of such knowledge, while recognizing that the amount of increased risk isn't certain, the ACS recommends choosing protein foods such as fish, poultry, and beans more often than red meat, and for people who eat processed meat products to do so sparingly, if at all."

Reviews of epidemiological studies have also found that processed meat consumption is associated with an increased risk of Alzheimer's disease, cardiovascular disease, gastric cancer, oral cancer, rectal cancer, stroke, and type-2 diabetes.

A systematic review and meta-analysis of 148 published articles was carried out on studies of the consumption of red meat and processed meat in relation to cancer incidence. Processed meat consumption was significantly correlated with a 6% greater risk of breast cancer, an 18% greater risk of colorectal cancer, a 21% greater risk of colon cancer, a 22% greater risk of rectal cancer and a 12% greater risk of lung cancer. A 2025 umbrella review found that a high intake of processed meat is associated with an increased all-cause mortality risk.
