= World Cancer Research Fund =

British charity

- Formation: 1990; 36 years ago
- Type: Charitable organization
- Purpose: Cancer prevention, diet and cancer
- Headquarters: United Kingdom
- Website: www.wcrf.org

World Cancer Research Fund (WCRF UK) (Note: The World Cancer Research Fund's working name is WCRF UK.) is a cancer prevention charity in the United Kingdom that is part of the World Cancer Research Fund International network.

The World Cancer Research Fund funds scientific research into how diet, physical activity and weight affect cancer risk and also funds health information programmes to raise awareness so people can reduce their cancer risk by eating a healthy diet, being physically active and maintaining a healthy weight.

== History ==
WCRF UK is a cancer prevention charity that was founded in 1990. WCRF UK is an active member of the World Cancer Research Fund International network. The network comprises WCRF UK, American Institute for Cancer Research, Wereld Kanker Onderzoek Fonds in the Netherlands and World Cancer Research Fund Hong Kong.

WCRF UK creates awareness of the relationship between diet, physical activity, weight and cancer risk. It focuses on funding research into diet and cancer prevention and to consolidate and interpret global research to create practical messages on reducing risk of cancer. The World Cancer Research Fund International (global network) has published several expert reports with research from WCRF UK.

The first expert report, Food, Nutrition and the Prevention of Cancer: a Global perspective was published in 1997 and examined all the available evidence on the links between cancer and diet. In November 2007, the WCRF global network published Food, Nutrition, Physical Activity and the Prevention of Cancer: a Global Perspective. Also known as the Second Expert Report. Following an initial sweep of half a million research studies eventually, 7,000 were deemed relevant and met the quality criteria for definitive conclusions to be drawn about cancer prevention. A panel of 21 experts then made 10 recommendations for reducing cancer risk. WCRF recommendations are developed by an independent expert panel based on the systematic evidence reviewed.

The launch of the Second Expert Report was a big news story in the UK. The report was described by the New Scientist magazine as a “landmark in our understanding of diet and cancer” while The Economist said: “It is the most rigorous study so far on the links between food, physical activity and cancer”. Project Director of the report Professor Martin Wiseman said: “Our recommendations are based on the best science available. They are recommendations, not commandments. The whole point of them is to give people the information they need to make their everyday choices informed ones.”

In February 2009, the WCRF global network published Policy and Action for Cancer Prevention, a companion document to the Second Expert Report. It included 48 recommendations for changes that different groups in society can make to help prevent cancer. It also included a preventability study that estimated that a third of the most common cancers in the UK could be prevented through diet, physical activity and weight management.

In 2018, the World Cancer Research Fund International published its Third Expert Report which concluded that diet, nutrition, obesity and low physical activity are modifiable risk factors for cancer. The report was published on behalf of WCRF UK, WCRF Netherlands and the American Institute for Cancer Research.

WCRF UK is registered with the Charity Commission for England and Wales and around 95% of their funding comes from the UK public.

== Research ==
WCRF UK spends about £6.2 million per year on scientific research, health policy and education programmes. WCRF International manages and administers the research programme on behalf of WCRF UK. UK researchers can apply for Investigator Initiated grants for a maximum of £250,000 for up to four years or for Seed grants for a maximum of £60,000 for two years.

=== Global Cancer Update Programme ===
In 2006, WCRF International, WCRF UK, American Institute for Cancer Research (AICR) and Wereld Kanker Onderzoek Fonds (Netherlands) established the Continuous Update Project. It was renamed the Global Cancer Update Programme in 2022. CUP Global includes the largest global cancer prevention and survivorship database in the world with over 12,000 academic publications. It is based at the School of Public Health at Imperial College London. The programme is designed to keep the evidence on diet and cancer current as new evidence emerges. The CUP Global team at Imperial has conducted over 22 systematic reviews. Research from CUP Global helped to underpin the development of WCRF International's Third Expert Report, which assessed the evidence of 17 cancer types and included updates to their recommendations.

=== Independent reviews ===
A 2025 systematic review of the 2007 and 2018 WCRF/AICR guidelines found that significant risk reductions were consistently observed for breast cancer, colorectal cancer, esophageal cancer, kidney cancer, lung cancer, obesity-related cancers and uterus cancer.

A 2025 umbrella review found that adherence to the 2007 WCRF/AICR dietary recommendations lowers risk of all cancers.

A 2026 systematic review using WCRF criteria found that vegetarian diets are associated with a lower colorectal, colon and breast cancer risk.

== Health Information programmes ==
WCRF UK's Great Grub Club programme is aimed at four to seven-year-olds and their parents. According to its website, its aim is to encourage healthy eating and an active lifestyle in a fun and informative way.

WCRF UK produces publications that aim to translate scientific research into language that is easy to understand, providing information about the links between lifestyle and cancer and advice on how to make healthy changes.

A newsletter for supporters is published four times a year that includes information about scientific findings and gives practical advice about making healthy lifestyle changes.

WCRF UK provides information for health professionals to help them educate their patients. This includes publishing Informed, a newsletter aimed at health professionals. There is also a specific section for health professionals on the WCRF UK website.

== Selected publications ==
- Vieira AR, Abar L, Chan DSM, Vingeliene S, Polemiti E, Stevens C, Greenwood D, Norat T (2017). "Foods and beverages and colorectal cancer risk: a systematic review and meta-analysis of cohort studies, an update of the evidence of the WCRF-AICR Continuous Update Project". Annals of Oncology. 28 (8): 1788–1802. doi:10.1093/annonc/mdx171. PMID 28407090.
- "Diet, Nutrition, Physical Activity and Cancer: A Global Perspective" (PDF). World Cancer Research Fund. 2018. Archived (PDF) from the original on December 4, 2024.
- "Meat, fish and dairy products and the risk of cancer" (PDF). World Cancer Research Fund. 2018. Archived (PDF) from the original on December 27, 2024.
- Papadimitriou N, Markozannes G, Kanellopoulou A, Critselis E, Alhardan S, Karafousia V, Kasimis JC, Katsaraki C, Papadopoulou A, Zografou M, Lopez DS, Chan DS, Kyrgiou M, Ntzani E, Cross AJ, Marrone MT, Platz EA, Gunter MJ, Tsilidis KK (2021). "An umbrella review of the evidence associating diet and cancer risk at 11 anatomical sites". Nature Communications. 12 (1) 4579. Bibcode:2021NatCo..12.4579P. doi:10.1038/s41467-021-24861-8. PMC 8319326. PMID 34321471.

== See also ==
- American Institute for Cancer Research
- Cancer in the United Kingdom
