= Umbrella review =

Review of systematic reviews or meta-analyses

In medical research, an umbrella review is a review of systematic reviews or meta-analyses. They may also be called overviews of reviews, reviews of reviews, summaries of systematic reviews, or syntheses of reviews. Umbrella reviews are among the highest levels of evidence currently available in medicine.

By summarizing information from multiple overview articles, umbrella reviews make it easier to review the evidence and allow for comparison of results between each of the individual reviews. Umbrella reviews may address a broader question than a typical review, such as discussing multiple different treatment comparisons instead of only one. They are especially useful for developing guidelines and clinical practice, and when comparing competing interventions.
