= American Institute for Cancer Research =

American non-profit organization

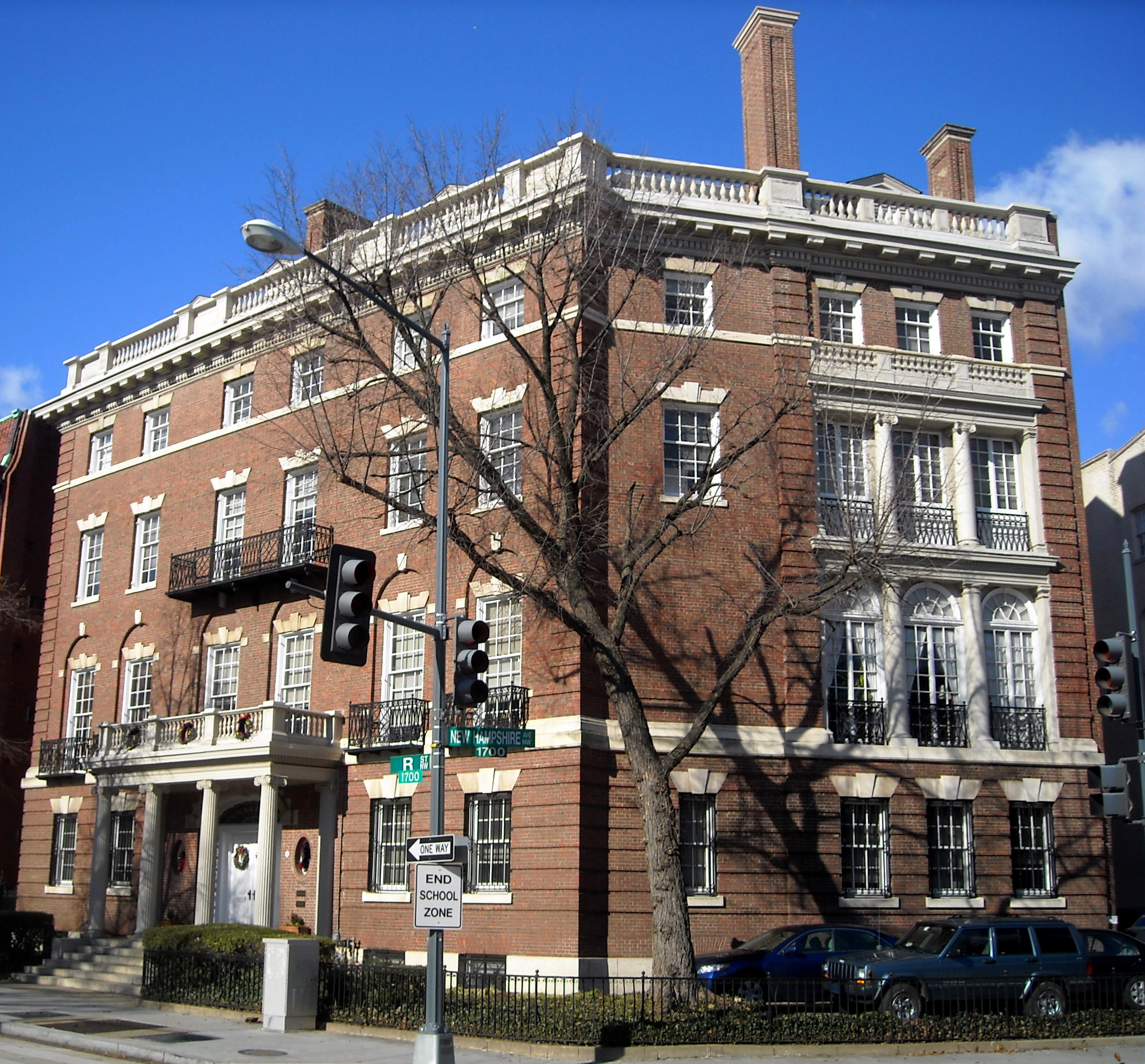
The Thomas Nelson Page House, headquarters of the American Institute for Cancer Research, in Washington, D.C.

The American Institute for Cancer Research (AICR) is a large American cancer research organization associated with the World Cancer Research Fund umbrella organization.

As of 2024, the charity has a four-star rating from Charity Navigator, with a score of 96 out of 100.

One of AICR's major initiatives is the Continuous Update Project (CUP), which is a comprehensive review of all the available scientific literature on the links between diet, physical activity, weight, and cancer risk.

Its research focus areas include the links between diet and cancer risk, the effects of physical activity on cancer prevention and treatment, and the development of new cancer therapies.
