= Nutritional epidemiology =

Field of medical research on disease and diet

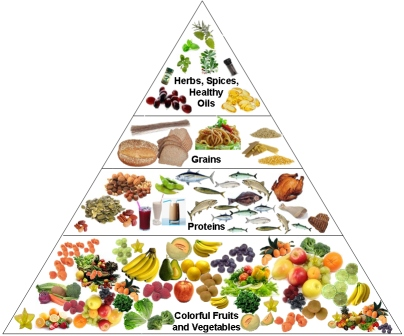
The nutrition pyramid, also known as the food pyramid

Nutritional epidemiology examines dietary and nutritional factors in relation to disease occurrence at a population level. Nutritional epidemiology is a relatively new field of medical research that studies the relationship between nutrition and health. It is a young discipline in epidemiology that is continuing to grow in relevance to present-day health concerns. Diet and physical activity are difficult to measure accurately, which may partly explain why nutrition has received less attention than other risk factors for disease in epidemiology.

Nutritional epidemiology uses knowledge from nutritional science to aid in the understanding of human nutrition and the explanation of basic underlying mechanisms. Nutritional science information is also used in the development of nutritional epidemiological studies and interventions including clinical, case-control and cohort studies. Nutritional epidemiological methods have been developed to study the relationship between diet and disease. Findings from these studies impact public health as they guide the development of dietary recommendations including those tailored specifically for the prevention of certain diseases, conditions and cancers.

It is argued by western researchers that nutritional epidemiology should be a core component in the training of all health and social service professions because of its increasing relevance and past successes in improving the health of the public worldwide. However, it is also argued that nutritional epidemiological studies yield unreliable findings as they rely on the role of diet in health and disease, which is known as an exposure that is susceptible to considerable measurement error.

== History of nutritional epidemiology ==
Nutritional epidemiology started as a subdiscipline of epidemiology in the 1980s before advancing into a core disciple in epidemiology. It deals with the role nutritional exposures play in the occurrence of impaired health conditions. The assessment of these exposures and the investigation of the association between exposure and outcome form the core of nutritional epidemiology. It is through the understanding of how nutrients and vitamins affect deficiency and disease early in the twentieth century that nutritional epidemiology became better established. Later in the twentieth century it gained further significance when the role of exposure in chronic disease became well understood. Since then, the application of information from nutritional epidemiology has led to significant scientific and social breakthroughs. Epidemiological methods have been used for centuries to study the relationship between diet and disease, yet were not considered definitive. Advancements to the ways in which dietary exposures were measured gave rise to the reliability of data. The inclusion of genetic risk factors in models of causation have made nutritional epidemiology an increasingly interdisciplinary field.

== Nutritional science ==
Various medicinal capsules and tablets

Nutritional science is a multidisciplinary study area concerned with the role of nutrition in health and disease across the human lifespan. Nutritional epidemiology and nutritional science are two fields that share knowledge about the interactions of nutrients, food consumption, and the human body. An understanding of the principles of nutritional sciences is required to understand nutritional epidemiology. The two fields explore diet-disease relationships to provide preventative measures for the public. Research in nutritional science also provides the basis for food regulations and dietary guidelines. Knowledge from Nutritional science has raised societal awareness about links between food consumption and wellbeing. Examples of some of the successes nutritional science has contributed to findings which include linking folate deficiency to a higher risk of neural tube defects, vitamin C deficiency to scurvy, consumption of trans fat to a higher risk of cardiovascular disease and linking consumption of fish during pregnancy to reduced risk of preterm birth. These occurrences continue to be discovered with increasing scientific information and evidence, leading to more opportunities for successful intervention and prevention.

== Nutritional epidemiological studies ==
Nutritional epidemiological studies form the foundation for nutrition-related discoveries. The studies reveal the relationship between nutrition and health, with a focus on aetiology of chronic disease. They provide a comprehensive view of the way in which diet affects or maintains health and wellbeing in individuals and populations. A prominent controversy lies within the ability to reliably and accurately measure exposures as they are subject to measurement errors and variation. Nutritional epidemiological study designs are required to establish a definitive relationship between diet and disease to be able to develop interventions and policies that will be implemented for the health of the public. There are observational and experimental investigations which have applicable study designs that fall under them including ecological, cross-sectional, cohort, case control, clinical and community trails.

Investigators in experimental studies have the control of assigning exposures, whereas in observational studies exposures are observed only with no intervention. Experimental studies can therefore provide stronger evidence for the effect of exposure on outcome, which would otherwise be considered unethical in an observational study as exposure could be harmful. But Observational studies are simpler to carry out and more cost effective. Observational studies are able to detect rare or unusual findings over long periods of time (diet-related diseases develop over time) which would otherwise burden subjects and be expensive in Experimental studies. In nutritional epidemiology, Experimental studies may be used to draw causal conclusions between dietary exposures and health outcomes, however for some diet-disease relations there are ethical considerations. Nutritional policy and procedure decisions are therefore guided by findings from a combination of sources to ensure accuracy, reliability and validity.

The measure of exposure is dependent on the question and study design. It can be objectively or subjectively measured on individuals or populations in the past or present. In nutritional epidemiological studies this refers to factors such as food including nutrients and non-nutrients and the social environment. The effect of these exposures is measured as outcomes. In nutritional epidemiological the outcome is commonly referred to as the disease state or the anthropometric or physiological state under either continuous or discrete variables. The objective of nutritional epidemiological research is to provide scientific evidence to support an understanding of the role of nutrition on the causes and prevention of ill health. It is important to address the factors that affect food supply, including quality, quantity and balance and the factors that affect food after consumption. The development of a specific, feasible and relevant aim of study and target population is the first step in epidemiological research. The second step is the selection and correct use of a method that measures exposure and outcome followed by extensive analysis. Exposure and outcome of interest are measured to enable reliability of the relationship assessed. Studies that are well designed, have a strong foundation, detailed methodology and are governed by ethical principles will have the derived conclusions used to improve health care. All steps require knowledge of past and current literature.

The different nutritional epidemiological study designs offer advantages and limitations in different circumstances.

=== Ecological study ===
An ecological study is an observational study that studies risk-modifying factors on health outcomes of populations based on their geographical and/or temporal ecological state. Ecological studies are useful in studying patterns of disease in large populations however may not accurately reflect true associations between individuals within those large populations. Ecological studies use geographical information to examine spatial framework of disease and exposure but there is potential for systemic difference in classification language.

=== Cross-sectional study ===
A cross-sectional study is an observational-individual study that measures exposure and outcome in the present. In examining the relationship between disease and diet, cross sectional studies provide a snapshot of the frequency of disease in a population at a given point in time. Cross-sectional studies offer advantages such as the ability to measure multiple outcomes and exposures and, in the planning, and allocation of health resources as it assesses the burden of disease in a specified population. The measure of the outcome is however heavily reliant on population responses. Non-response results in responder bias and therefore unreliable results.

=== Case control study ===
A case-control study is an observational-individual study that is defined by the outcome (i.e. measures outcomes in the present and past exposure is established). It involves two groups controls and cases (diseased), both which have two treatments; exposed and unexposed. Case-control studies can be used to study diseases that are rare and over long periods of time however are limited to examining one outcome and are also susceptible to the effects of bias if selected control groups are no representative of the population, so give rise to misleading results.

=== Cohort study ===
A cohort study is an observational-individual study that measures exposure in the present over long periods of time and the outcome is determined in the future. Cohort studies allow for multiple outcomes to be measure per one exposure. In nutritional epidemiological studies it is advantageous in measuring outcomes that occur after exposure and can measure both incidence and prevalence. Cohort studies are however costly and time consuming. As outcome is determined in the future, any issues pertaining to the collection of information or confounders cannot be resolved back in time.

=== Clinical and community trails ===
Clinical and community trails are experimental studies that involve active intervention in either individuals (clinical) or populations (community). Clinical trials often involve test and procedures carried on subjects placed in different treatment groups. Clinical trials allow for the evaluation of new therapies, drugs and procedures. Clinical trials however risk subject to experience side effects and inadvertent harm from the intervention therefore should only be considered when supporting evidence is strong. Community trials involve assigning groups of individuals with and without disease to different interventions. This allows for larger scale findings however does not account for individual variability.

== Social impact ==
The impact nutritional epidemiology had in the past has led to social, physical and economic changes. Nutritional epidemiological findings guide dietary recommendations including the prevention of certain disease and cancers. They play a role in policies on diet and health given the works are published based on grounding evidence. The observational findings allowed for health interventions such as the fortification of foods and limits/bans of certain substances from food. These implemented changes have since enhanced human health and wellbeing by means of prevention and improvement. Research suggest its impact specifically on cancer patients has been promising. The nutritional support to some provides relief of side effects, improves response to therapy and reduces the risk of cancer reoccurring, all of which enhance the quality of life for cancer patients. Progressive impacts have also been seen on a variety of infectious diseases, chronic disease, and congenital malformations, ultimately elevating the burden on the healthcare system and striving for optimal function.

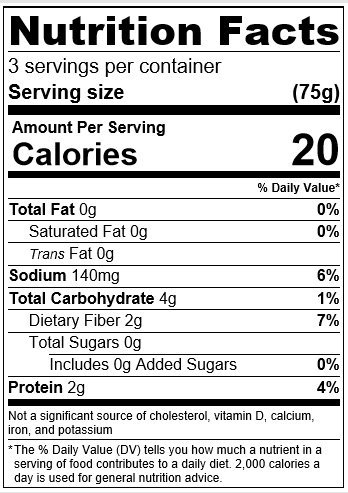
A Nutritional Label on Food Package

Nutritional epidemiology is the scientific basis upon which public health nutrition is built. Nutritional epidemiology aims to deliver knowledge on how to cope with an imbalance between nutrients that causes illness such as anaemia, goitre wasting and stunting. The understanding of the characteristics of exposures require measurement to understand the diet–disease relationship. The ability to relate exposure to steps in the causal pathway improves the value of findings in relation to public health recommendations.

== See also ==
- Malnutrition
- Nutrition and cognition
- Nutrition and pregnancy
- Nutritional anthropology
- Epidemiology
- Over-nutrition
