= FOOD Programme =

European health project

FOOD programme
- Mission statement: Fighting Obesity through Offer and Demand
- Commercial?: No
- Type of project: Funded project from 2009 to 2011. Independent programme since 2012.
- Location: Austria, Belgium, Czech Republic, France, Italy, Portugal, Romania, Slovakia, Spain and Sweden
- Established: January 2009
- Funding: Funded by DG SANCO through the Executive Agency for Health and Consumers
- Status: Active
- Website: www.food-programme.eu

FOOD (Fighting Obesity through Offer and Demand) started in 2009 in six countries as a European project co-funded by the European Commission and gathering public and private partners to promote balanced nutrition. Since 2012, it has become an independent programme existing in 10 countries: Austria, Belgium, Czech Republic, France, Spain, Italy, Portugal, Romania, Slovakia and Sweden.

The FOOD Project celebrated its 10 anniversary in 2019.

== Project rational ==
The EU Platform for Action on Diet, Physical Activity and Health provided the policy framework for the project with DG SANCO of the European Commission securing the funding through their Executive Agency for Health and Consumers (EAHC).

== Objectives ==
The two main objectives of the project are:

- To improve the nutritional habits of employees by raising their awareness to health issues.
- To improve the nutritional quality of the food offered in restaurants.

The specific objectives are:

- To evaluate the needs and expectations regarding nutrition information of restaurants and employees in companies
- To collect experts' recommendations after the understanding of the needs
- To adapt the recommendations into practical messages and communication tools
- To adapt the offer in restaurants to the demand of the consumers
- To organize useful trainings according to the countries
- To enable a large access to detailed information to the targets.

=== Methodology ===
To meet the objectives, the FOOD project has created essential channels of communication between the companies and the restaurants using its unique network of contacts through the Ticket Restaurant® solution, following five complementary sets of actions:

1. An inventory of existing health promotion programmes in the workplace and in restaurants was followed by two questionnaires. The first was a quantitative survey, addressing employees (52,000) and restaurants (5,000) to better understand the project's needs. The second, a qualitative study, was conducted by Dauphine Junior Consulting, conducting 60 interviews in restaurants in 12 countries.
2. Following a comparative study of the surveys' results, recommendations were made by the partners.
3. Simple tools were developed, adapted and piloted for restaurants and companies.
4. Pilots were evaluated.
5. Following the evaluation, tools were adapted and best practices disseminated.

== Partners ==
=== Partners of the project ===
- Main partner: Edenred S.A.

Associated partners:

- Information and Research Centre for Food Intolerances and Hygiene (CIRIHA)
- National Food and Health Plan of the Belgian Health Ministry (PNNS - SPF SP)
- Hravě žij zdravě o. s. (Healthy Living the Easy Way) and Project STOB (Stop Obesity) (STOB)
- Institut Paul Bocuse
- The University of Perugia
- Spanish Agency of Food Security and Nutrition (AESAN)
- Mediterranean Diet Foundation (FDM)
- Karolinska Institutet (KI)
- And 6 Edenred Units

Collaborating partners:

- Prevent
- NutriChallenge
- Professor Ambroise Martin
- Ministry of Agriculture in France
- Anact
- City University London
- Thalassa Sea&Spa
- Italian National Institute for the Research of Food and Nutrition (INRAN)
- Balearic Government (FOOD PRO-FIT)
- Generalitat de Catalunya
- Public Health Authority of the Slovak Republic (PHA SR)
- Edenred in Slovakia
- Keyhole Restaurant Association
- International Labour Organization (ILO)
- Eurotoques
- European Network for Workplace Health Promotion (ENWHP)
- The European project Guidelines for the Prevention of Obesity at the Workplace (GPOW)

=== Partners of the programme ===
- Coordinator: Edenred S.A.

The partners:

- Bundesministerium für Arbeit, Soziales, Gesundheit und Konsumentenschutz
- L'Institut de Recherche LABIRIS
- National Food and Health Plan of the Belgian Health Ministry (PNNS - SPF SP)
- Prevent
- NutriChallenge
- Project STOB (Stop Obesity) (STOB)
- The University of Perugia
- Rete Città Sane (WHO Healthy Cities Network)
- Italian Institute of Health (ISS)
- Spanish Academy of Nutritionists (La Academia de Nutricion)
- City University London
- General Direction of Health in Portugal (DGS)
- University of Porto
- Romanian Health Ministry
- Romanian National Institute of Public Health (INSP)
- AmCham Romania
- Romanian National Society of Family Medicine
- Public Health Authority of the Slovak Republic (PHA SR)
- International Labour Organization (ILO)
- European Network for Workplace Health Promotion (ENWHP)
- And 10 Edenred Units

== The programme ==
The partners have decided to continue developing and disseminating the project after the end of the funding period and the support from the European Commission. The partners are motivated to take advantage of the actions, experience and results of the project and create an adaptable programme.

A new consortium agreement linking 23 partners in 8 countries was signed in Brussels on December 14, 2011. The Consortium agreement was renewed first in 2015, and a second time for another 3 years with 28 partners in 10 countries in December 2018.

The programme is meant to be developed with new partners and in new countries.

== Yearly FOOD Barometers ==
As part of the evaluation of the European FOOD programme, barometers have been launched every year since 2012 in order to understand and analyse needs and opinions about healthy eating of the two main target groups: employees and restaurants.

Main trends and findings from the 2019 Barometers available here.

Country-by-country figures and analysis since 2012 available on the FOOD EU website.

== Activities ==
=== The FOOD Road Show ===
In October 2009, a double-decker bus customised with the FOOD colours drove through the main cities of the six participating countries, officially launching the communication campaign to the target audiences. The tour enabled the partners, with the collaboration of nutritionists, dietitians and chefs, to explain the FOOD project and to show the first communication tools created. The journey started in Paris and then continued on to Brussels, Stockholm, Prague, and Milan ending in Madrid.

=== The conferences at the European Parliament ===
Following the wish of the partners to continue the FOOD project by adapting it into a programme, a conference had been organised to mark the transition. The conference was held on 31 May 2011, at the European Parliament, during the Hungarian Presidency of the European Union.

A second conference was organised at the European Parliament in October 2017, entitled New technologies supporting the promotion of healthy eating in the workplace. It gathered 115 participants from the European institutions, the WHO Europe, national Health Ministries, research centres and private companies.

=== The FOOD restaurants network ===
A network of dedicated restaurants that adhere to the national FOOD recommendations was created in the participating countries, thought as the most effective way to reconnect the offer and the demand sides of balanced nutrition. The network is composed of more than 4500 restaurants.

=== The Alimentação Inteligente Book ===
One of the communication tools produced in the framework of the FOOD programme by the Portuguese partners, the Alimentação Inteligente - Coma melhor, poupe mais book [translation: Smart Food - Eat better, save more], won the Portuguese Food and Nutrition Awards 2013 in the Mobilization Initiative category.

=== The Spanish FOOD Guides for Restaurants and Employees ===
The Spanish partners of the FOOD programme edited and published two handy Guides: providing healthy and easy cooking/eating tips for both target groups - restaurants and employees.

FOOD Guide for restaurants.

FOOD Guide for employees.

=== Italian Roadshow for Restaurants ===
In 2019, a press conference hosted by the Ministry of Health introduced an itinerant training roadshow for restaurants. A partnership with Fipe – Italian Federation of Public Exercises, ISS – National Institute of Health and Healthy Cities Network OMS, was presented in Rome. The training sessions aim at sensitizing chefs about healthy and balanced lunch breaks.

Three cooking shows took place in three different Italian locations (Rome, Milan and Palermo), and gathered 250 restaurant owners and chefs.

The events were structured in three different modules:

→ food safety: avoid food contamination

→ nutritional safety: identify a healthy diet and balanced menus during lunch breaks

→ correct management of allergens

== Recent awards and recognitions (EU and international) ==
June 2019: The FOOD programme was awarded a Best practice certificate by the European Commission for its contribution towards promoting Healthy Lifestyles

September 2019: the Belgian Federal Public Service Health, Food Chain Safety and Environment (SPF SP) received an award from the United Nations Inter-Agency Task Force on the Prevention and Control of Non-communicable Diseases. This award recognises the FOOD programme's "outstanding contribution to achieving NCD-related Sustainable Development Goals".
