= FACR =

FACR may refer to:

- fat adaptation carbohydrate restoration, in preventive nutrition
- fellow of the American College of Radiology (ACR)
- FAČR, Football Association of the Czech Republic (Czech: Fotbalová asociace České republiky)

== See also ==
- fac^{r}, a medieval abbreviation, standing for faciliter.
