= Mediterranean Diet Foundation =

Spanish-based dietary non-profit organization

- Fundación Dieta Mediterránea
- Abbreviation: FDM
- Location: Barcelona, Spain
- President: Lluís Serra Majem
- Website: http://dietamediterranea.com/en/

The Mediterranean Diet Foundation (Fundación Dieta Mediterránea, F.D.M.) is a non-profit organization based in Barcelona that aims to promote the study, investigation, and dissemination of the Mediterranean diet.

== Objectives ==
The Foundation’s mission is to promote investigation of the health, historical, cultural, and gastronomical aspects of the Mediterranean diet. Another of the Foundation’s objectives is the dissemination of scientific findings about the diet and the promotion of its healthful use among different population groups.

== History ==
A group of companies from the food and agriculture sector wished to alert the public of the risks of abandoning healthy eating patterns, especially for children. They decided to create the Association for the Advancement of the Mediterranean Diet in 1995, with the mission of encouraging the consumption of traditional Mediterranean products.

The ADDM, jointly with other institutions such as the Barcelona City Council, created the Foundation in 1996.

The Mediterranean Diet Foundation is registered under the Spanish Agriculture, Food and Environment Ministry (Ministerio de Agricultura, Alimentación y Medio Ambiente), with the Registry Number 6/2006.

== Leadership ==
The president of the FDM is Lluís Serra Majem, a professor of preventative medicine and public health at the University of Las Palmas in Gran Canaria.

Other board members include vice president Francisco Sensat Alemany, director Joan Castells Gómez, science coordinators Anna Bach and Blanca Roman, and nutritionist Isabel Bertomeu.

The FDM Scientific Secretariat is located in the Parc Científic of Barcelona, a science park that houses various research groups and organizations, both independent and affiliated with the University of Barcelona.

=== Scientific committee ===
The scientific committee consists of twenty-three recognized international investigators from twelve different Mediterranean and non-Mediterranean countries. It advises the FDM on scientific matters and is presided over by the president of the foundation, Lluís Serra Majem.

== Activities ==
The FDM has been involved in a variety of activities, including:

- Dissemination of research findings through biennial conferences that take place during one of the biggest international food exhibitions, Alimentaria. At the first conference (1996), the Barcelona Declaration on the Mediterranean Diet was signed by the Food and Agriculture Organization, the Spanish Ministry of Agriculture, Fish and Food (MAPA), the Barcelona City Council and FDM.
- Creation of the Grande Covián award in 1996, with the objective of recognizing professionals who have contributed to the study of the health benefits of the Mediterranean diet.
- The granting of Honorary Diplomas since 2002 in recognition of individuals who have excelled in the cultural and social sphere with their contribution to the promotion of the Mediterranean culture. These diplomas are awarded at the same ceremony as the Grande Covián award, at each biennial conference. Individuals recognized in this way so far include Ferran Adrià, Georges Moustaki, Joan Manuel Serrat, Bigas Luna and Juan Antonio Corbalán.
- Development of distance education courses that cover the nutritional history, gastronomy and various other aspects of the Mediterranean diet.
- Publishing of books about the Mediterranean diet directed toward professionals as well as the general public.
- Establishment of institutional collaborations with the objective of promoting educational initiatives around the Mediterranean diet.
- Partnership with the FOOD Programme, that seeks to influence the workplace, aimed specifically at fighting obesity at the offer and demand channel.
- Mediterranean diet workshops in schools.
- A Mediterranean diet bus in Valencia and Catalonia to create awareness and educate children on the benefits of consuming a Mediterranean diet.
- Creation of the Mediterranean Diet Observatory in collaboration with the Barcelona City Council.
- Participation in the update of the Mediterranean Diet Pyramid.
