= Ikaria Study =

The Ikaria Study is a small-scale survey by the University of Athens School of Medicine of the diet and lifestyle of Greek people over age 80 on the island of Ikaria. The study found that the Ikarian diet includes olive oil, red wine, fish, coffee, herbal tea, honey, potatoes, garbanzo beans, black-eyed peas, lentils, and a limited amount of meat, sugar and dairy products, except goat milk.

The data showed that people on Ikaria achieved successful aging by reducing emotional and cognitive dysfunction while sustaining physical activities throughout old age. It also hypothesized that noon siesta and engagement in social activities are factors that contributed to the Ikarians' longevity.

== See also ==
- Mediterranean diet
- Ikarian coffee
