= Nutritional neuroscience =

Scientific discipline

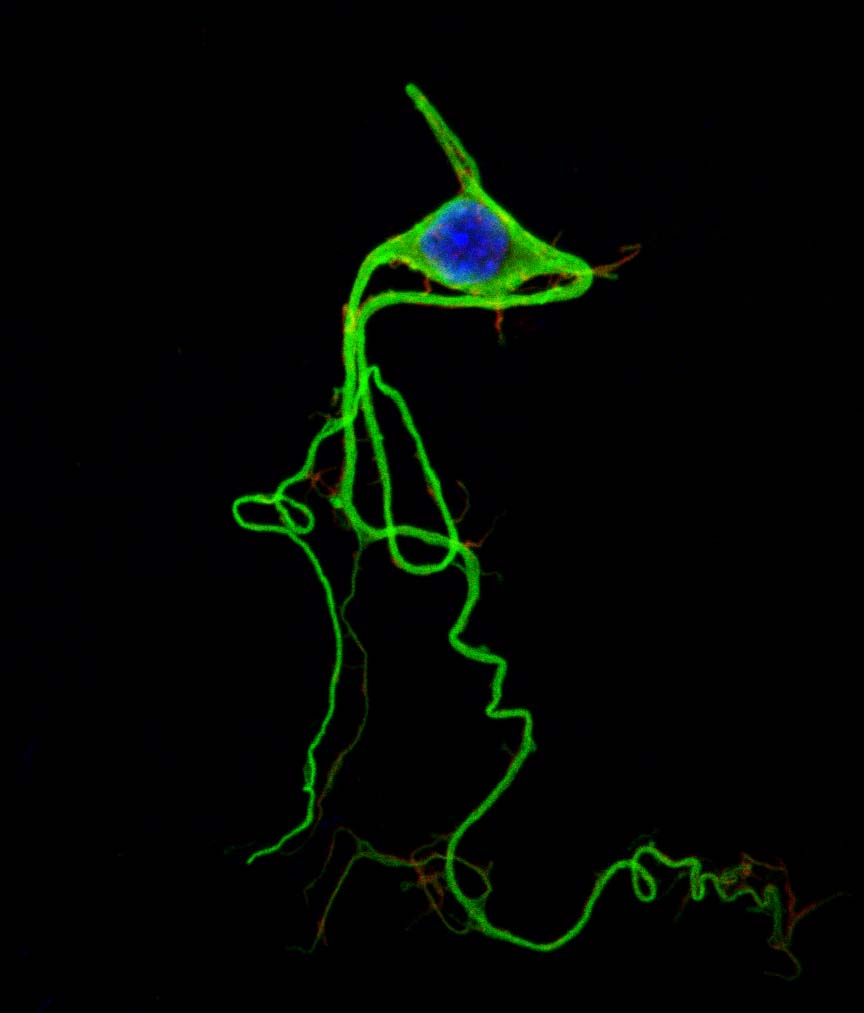
Poor diet in early childhood affects the number of neurons in parts of the brain.

Nutritional neuroscience is the scientific discipline that studies the effects various components of the diet such as minerals, vitamins, protein, carbohydrates, fats, dietary supplements, synthetic hormones, and food additives have on neurochemistry, neurobiology, behavior, and cognition.

Research on nutritional mechanisms and their effect on the brain shows they are involved in almost every facet of neurological functioning, including alterations in neurogenesis, neurotrophic factors, neural pathways and neuroplasticity, throughout the life cycle.

Relatively speaking, the brain consumes an immense amount of energy in comparison to the rest of the body. The human brain is approximately 2% of the human body mass and uses 20–25% of the total energy expenditure. Therefore, mechanisms involved in the transfer of energy from foods to neurons are likely to be fundamental to the control of brain function. Insufficient intake of selected vitamins, or certain metabolic disorders, affect cognitive processes by disrupting the nutrient-dependent processes within the body that are associated with the management of energy in neurons, which can subsequently affect neurotransmission, synaptic plasticity, and cell survival.

== Minerals ==
Deficiency or excess of essential minerals (e.g. iron, zinc, copper, and magnesium) can disrupt brain development and neurophysiology to affect behavior. Furthermore, minerals have been implicated in the pathophysiology of neurodegenerative diseases including Alzheimer's dementia.

=== Iron ===
Iron is essential for several critical metabolic enzymes and a deficiency of this mineral can disrupt brain development. For, example chronic marginal iron affects dopamine metabolism and myelin fatty acid composition and behavior in mice. In rats a marginal iron deficiency that does not cause anemia disrupted axon growth in the auditory nerve affecting auditory brainstem latency without major changes in myelination. In rhesus macaques, prenatal iron deficiency disrupts emotional behavior and polymorphisms that reduce the expression of monoamine oxidase interact with gestational iron deficiency to exacerbate the response to a stressful situation leading to increased aggressiveness. Inexpensive and effective iron supplementation is an available preventive strategy recommended by the World Health Organization. However, iron supplementation can exacerbate malaria infection. Therefore, individuals receiving iron supplementation in malaria-endemic areas must be carefully monitored.

=== Zinc ===
Zinc is essential for the structure and function of thousands of proteins critical for the function of every cell. Zinc can also serve as a neurotransmitter in the brain, thus a deficiency of this mineral can clearly disrupt development as well as neurophysiology. For example, zinc deficiency during early development impairs neurogenesis leading to memory impairments. However, zinc deficiency later in life can disrupt appetite and cause depression-like behavior. However, it is important to consider copper intake relative to zinc supplementation because excess zinc can disrupt copper absorption.

==== Deficiency ====
Conservative estimates suggest that 25% of the world's population is at risk of zinc deficiency.

Hypozincemia is usually a nutritional deficiency, but can also be associated with malabsorption, diarrhea, acrodermatitis enteropathica, chronic liver disease, chronic renal disease, sickle cell disease, diabetes, malignancy, pyroluria, and other chronic illnesses. It can also occur after bariatric surgery, heavy metal exposure and tartrazine.

Zinc deficiency is typically the result of inadequate dietary intake of zinc, disease states that promote zinc losses, or physiological states that require increased zinc. Populations that consume primarily plant-based diets that are low in bioavailable zinc often have zinc deficiencies. Diseases or conditions that involve intestinal malabsorption promote zinc losses. Fecal losses of zinc caused by diarrhea are one contributing factor, often common in developing countries. Changes in intestinal tract absorbability and permeability due, in part, to viral, protozoal, and bacteria pathogens may also encourage fecal losses of zinc. Physiological states that require increased zinc include periods of growth in infants and children as well as in mothers during pregnancy.

===== Anorexia =====
Zinc deficiency may cause a decrease in appetite which can degenerate into anorexia or anorexia nervosa. Appetite disorders, in turn, cause malnutrition and, notably, inadequate zinc intake. Anorexia itself is a cause of zinc deficiency, thus leading to a vicious cycle: the worsening of anorexia worsens the zinc deficiency. A 1994 randomized, double-blind, placebo-controlled trial showed that zinc (14 mg per day) doubled the rate of body mass increase in the treatment of anorexia nervosa.

===== Cognitive and motor function impairment =====
Cognitive and motor function may also be impaired in zinc deficient children. Zinc deficiency can interfere with many organ systems especially when it occurs during a time of rapid growth and development when nutritional needs are high, such as during infancy. In animal studies, rats who were deprived of zinc during early fetal development exhibited increased emotionality, poor memory, and abnormal response to stress which interfered with performance in learning situations. Zinc deprivation in monkeys showed that zinc deficient animals were emotionally less mature, and also had cognitive deficits indicated by their difficulty in retaining previously learned problems and in learning new problems. Human observational studies show weaker results. Low maternal zinc status has been associated with less attention during the neonatal period and worse motor functioning. In some studies, supplementation has been associated with motor development in very low birth weight infants and more vigorous and functional activity in infants and toddlers.

Plasma zinc level has been associated with many psychological disorders. However, the nature of this relationship remains unclear in most instances. An increasing amount of evidence suggests that zinc deficiency could play a causal role in the etiology of depression. Indeed, zinc supplementation has been reported to improve measures of depression in randomized double blind placebo controlled trials.

=== Copper ===
==== Deficiency ====
The neurodegenerative syndrome of copper deficiency has been recognized for some time in ruminant animals, in which it is commonly known as "swayback". The disease involves a nutritional deficiency in the trace element copper. Copper is ubiquitous and daily requirement is low making acquired copper deficiency very rare. Copper deficiency can manifest in parallel with vitamin B12 and other nutritional deficiencies. The most common cause of copper deficiency is a remote gastrointestinal surgery, such as gastric bypass surgery, due to malabsorption of copper, or zinc toxicity. On the other hand, Menkes disease is a genetic disorder of copper deficiency involving a wide variety of symptoms that is often fatal.

===== Neurological presentation =====
Copper deficiency can cause a wide variety of neurological problems including, myelopathy, peripheral neuropathy, and optic neuropathy.

===== Myelopathy =====
Affected individuals typically present difficulty walking (gait difficulty) caused by sensory ataxia (irregular muscle coordination) due to dorsal column dysfunction or degeneration of the spinal cord (myelopathy).

In brain MRI, there is often an increased T2 signalling at the posterior columns of the spinal cord in patients with myelopathy caused by copper deficiency. T2 signalling is often an indicator of some kind of neurodegeneration. There are some changes in the spinal cord MRI involving the thoracic cord, the cervical cord or sometimes both. Copper deficiency myelopathy is often compared to subacute combined degeneration (SCD). Subacute combined degeneration is also a degeneration of the spinal cord, but instead vitamin B12 deficiency is the cause of the spinal degeneration. SCD also has the same high T2 signalling intensities in the posterior column as copper deficient patient in MRI imaging.

===== Peripheral neuropathy =====
Another common symptom of copper deficiency is peripheral neuropathy, which is numbness or tingling that can start in the extremities and can sometimes progress radially inward towards the torso. In an Advances in Clinical Neuroscience & Rehabilitation (ACNR) published case report, a 69-year-old patient had progressively worsened neurological symptoms. These symptoms included diminished upper limb reflexes with abnormal lower limb reflexes, sensation to light touch and pin prick was diminished above the waist, vibration sensation was lost in the sternum, and markedly reduced proprioception or sensation about the self's orientation. Many people with the neurological effects of copper deficiency complain about very similar or identical symptoms as the patient. This numbness and tingling poses danger for the elderly because it increases their risk of falling and injuring themselves. Peripheral neuropathy can become very disabling, leaving some patients dependent on wheel chairs or walking canes for mobility if there is lack of correct diagnosis. Rarely can copper deficiency cause major disabling symptoms. The deficiency will have to be present for an extensive amount of time until such disabling conditions manifest.

===== Optic neuropathy =====
Some patients with copper deficiency have shown signs of vision and color loss. The vision is usually lost in the peripheral views of the eye. The bilateral vision loss is usually very gradual. An optical coherence tomography (OCT) shows some nerve fiber layer loss in most patients, suggesting the vision loss and color vision loss was secondary to optic neuropathy or neurodegeneration.

==== Toxicity ====
Copper toxicity can occur from excessive supplement use, eating acid foods cooked in uncoated copper cookware, exposure to excess copper in drinking water, or as the result of an inherited metabolic disorder in the case of Wilson's disease. A significant portion of the toxicity of copper comes from its ability to accept and donate single electrons as it changes oxidation state. This catalyzes the production of very reactive radical ions, such as hydroxyl radical in a manner similar to Fenton chemistry. This catalytic activity of copper is used by the enzymes with which it is associated, thus is only toxic when unsequestered and unmediated. This increase in unmediated reactive radicals is generally termed oxidative stress, and is an active area of research in a variety of diseases where copper may play an important but more subtle role than in acute toxicity.

Some of the effects of aging may be associated with excess copper. In addition, studies have found that people with mental illnesses, such as schizophrenia, had heightened levels of copper in their systems. However, it is unknown at this stage whether the copper contributes to the mental illness, whether the body attempts to store more copper in response to the illness, or whether the high levels of copper are the result of the mental illness.

===== Alzheimer's disease =====
Elevated free copper levels exist in Alzheimer's disease. Copper and zinc are known to bind to amyloid beta proteins in Alzheimer's disease.

=== Manganese ===
Manganese is a component of some enzymes and stimulates the development and activity of other enzymes. Manganese superoxide dismutase (MnSOD) is the principal antioxidant in mitochondria. Several enzymes activated by manganese contribute to the metabolism of carbohydrates, amino acids, and cholesterol.

Deficiency of manganese causes skeletal deformation in animals and inhibits the production of collagen in wound healing. On the other hand, manganese toxicity is associated with neurological complications.

==== Toxicity ====
Manganese poisoning is a toxic condition resulting from chronic exposure to manganese and first identified in 1837 by James Couper.

===== Presentation =====
Chronic exposure to excessive Mn levels can lead to a variety of psychiatric and motor disturbances, termed manganism. Generally, exposure to ambient Mn air concentrations in excess of 5 mg Mn/m3 can lead to Mn-induced symptoms.

In initial stages of manganism, neurological symptoms consist of reduced response speed, irritability, mood changes, and compulsive behaviors. Upon protracted exposure symptoms are more prominent and resemble those of idiopathic Parkinson's disease, as which it is often misdiagnosed, although there are particular differences in both the symptoms (nature of tremors, for example), response to drugs such as levodopa, and affected portion of the basal ganglia. Symptoms are also similar to Lou Gehrig's disease and multiple sclerosis.

===== Causes =====
Manganism has become an active issue in workplace safety as it has been the subject of numerous product liability lawsuits against manufacturers of arc welding supplies. In these lawsuits, welders have accused the manufacturers of failing to provide adequate warning that their products could cause welding fumes to contain dangerously high manganese concentrations that could lead welders to develop manganism. Companies employing welders are also being sued, for what colloquially is known as "welders' disease". However, studies fail to show any link between employment as a welder and manganism (or other neurological problems).

Manganism is also documented in reports of illicit methcathinone manufacturing. This is due to manganese being a byproduct of methcathinone synthesis if potassium permanganate is used as an oxidiser. Symptoms include apathy, bradykinesia, gait disorder with postural instability, and spastic-hypokinetic dysarthria. Another street drug sometimes contaminated with manganese is the so-called "Bazooka", prepared by free-base methods from cocaine using manganese carbonate.

Reports also mention such sources as contaminated drinking water, and fuel additive methylcyclopentadienyl manganese tricarbonyl (MMT), which on combustion becomes partially converted into manganese phosphates and sulfate that go airborne with the exhaust, and manganese ethylene-bis-dithiocarbamate (Maneb), a pesticide.

===== Pathological mechanisms =====
Manganese may affect liver function, but the threshold of acute toxicity is very high. On the other hand, more than 95% of manganese is eliminated by biliary excretion. Any existing liver damage may slow this process, increasing its concentration in blood plasma. The exact neurotoxic mechanism of manganese is uncertain but there are clues pointing at the interaction of manganese with iron, zinc, aluminum, and copper. Based on a number of studies, disturbed iron metabolism could underlie the neurotoxic action of manganese.

It participates in Fenton reactions and could thus induce oxidative damage, a hypothesis corroborated by the evidence from studies of affected welders. A study of the exposed workers showed that they have significantly fewer children. This may indicate that long-term accumulation of manganese affects fertility. Pregnant animals repeatedly receiving high doses of manganese bore malformed offspring significantly more often compared to controls. Manganism mimics Schizophrenia. It is found in large quantities in paint and steelmaking.

===== Treatment =====
The current mainstay of manganism treatment is levodopa and chelation with EDTA. Both have limited and at best transient efficacy. Replenishing the deficit of dopamine with levodopa has been shown to initially improve extrapyramidal symptoms, but the response to treatment goes down after 2 or 3 years, with worsening condition of the same patients noted even after 10 years since last exposure to manganese. Enhanced excretion of manganese prompted by chelation therapy brings its blood levels down but the symptoms remain largely unchanged, raising questions about efficacy of this form of treatment.

Increased ferroportin protein expression in human embryonic kidney (HEK293) cells is associated with decreased intracellular Mn concentration and attenuated cytotoxicity, characterized by the reversal of Mn-reduced glutamate uptake and diminished lactate dehydrogenase (LDH) leakage.

===== Locations =====
The Red River Delta near Hanoi has high levels of manganese or arsenic in the water. Approximately 65 percent of the region's wells contain high levels of arsenic, manganese, selenium and barium. This was also published in the Proceedings of the National Academy of Sciences.

=== Magnesium ===
Magnesium is necessary for the function of many metabolic enzymes and also serves as a key regulator of calcium channels involved in neurotransmission (e.g. NMDA receptor). Magnesium supplementation facilitates nerve regeneration after injury. Although unpolished grains contain magnesium, phytic acid in grains can inhibit its absorption. Leafy greens are an excellent source of magnesium.

== Vitamins ==
Deficiency or excess intake of many vitamins can affect the brain contributing to developmental and degenerative diseases.

=== Vitamin A ===
Vitamin A is an essential nutrient for mammals which takes form in either retinol or the provitamin beta-Carotene. It helps regulation of cell division, cell function, genetic regulation, helps enhance the immune system, and is required for brain function, chemical balance, growth and development of the central nervous system and vision.

==== Learning memory ====
In an experiment by Chongqing Medical University pregnant rats were either plentiful in vitamin A or were of a vitamin A deficiency (VAD) due to their diet. The offspring of these rats were then tested in a water maze at 8 weeks old and it was found the VAD offspring had a harder time finishing the maze which helps show that these rats, even while having a deficiency from in utero, have more problems with learning memory. Young rats in a separate study by the same university also showed impaired long-term potentiation in the hippocampus when they were VAD which shows neuronal impairment. When the patient is VAD for too long, the effects of the damage to the hippocampus can be irreversible.

==== Spatial memory ====
Vitamin A affects spatial memory most of the time because the size of the nuclei in hippocampal neurons are reduced by approximately 70% when there is a deficiency which affects a person's abilities for higher cognitive function. In a study by the University of Cagliari, Italy, VAD rats had more trouble learning a Radial arm maze than rats who had normal levels of the vitamin. The healthy rats were able to correctly solve the maze within the 15-day training period and other rats that were once deficient but had vitamin A restored to normal levels were also able to solve it. Here it was found that the retinoid receptors which help transport vitamin A were of normal function.

==== Prevention, treatment and symptoms ====
Eating foods high in vitamin A or taking dietary supplements, retinol or retinal will prevent a deficiency. The foods highest in vitamin A are any pigmented fruits and vegetables and leafy green vegetables also provide beta-Carotene. There can be symptoms of fat loss and a reduction of any weight gain that would be considered normal for an individual, especially developmental weight gains such as in infants which would occur if the infant was deprived of vitamin A in utero and/or if it was deprived postnatal for an extensive period of time. The deficiency can also cause conditions such as blindness or night blindness, also known as nyctalopia. Night blindness is due to the inability to regenerate rhodopsin in the rods which is needed in dim light in order to see properly. A treatment of supplements of retinoic acid which is a part of vitamin A can help replenish levels and help bring learning to normal, but after 39 weeks this is ineffective even if the treatment is daily because it will not bring the retinoid hypo-signalling back to normal.

==== Relationship with zinc ====
Zinc is needed to maintain normal vitamin A levels in blood plasma. It also helps vitamin A become metabolized by the liver. However evidence suggests that when someone is deficient in both vitamin A and zinc, memory is more improved when just vitamin A is increased than when just zinc is increased. Of course memory has the largest improvement when both are increased. When one of these nutrients is not balanced, the other is most likely to be affected because they rely on each other for proper functioning in learning.

=== Thiamin (vitamin B1) ===
Vitamin B_{1}, also known as thiamine, is a coenzyme essential for the metabolism of carbohydrates. This vitamin is important for the facilitation of glucose use, thus ensuring the production of energy for the brain, and normal functioning of the nervous system, muscles, and heart.

Thiamine is found in all living tissues, and is uniformly distributed throughout mammalian nervous tissue, including the brain and spinal cord. Metabolism and coenzyme function of the vitamin suggest a distinctive function for thiamin within the nervous system.

The brain retains its thiamine content in the face of a vitamin-deficient diet with great tenacity, as it is the last of all nervous tissues studied to become depleted. A 50% reduction of thiamine stores in rats becomes apparent after only 4 days of being put on a thiamine-deficient diet. However, polyneuritic signs do not begin to appear until about 4 or 5 weeks have passed. Similar results have been found in human subjects.

==== Deficiencies ====
The body has only small stores of B_{1}; accordingly, there is risk of deficiency if the level of intake is reduced only for a few weeks. Thiamin deficiency during critical periods of early development can disrupts neurogenesis in animal models. Lack of thiamin later in life causes the disease known as beriberi. There are two forms of beriberi: "wet", and "dry". Dry beriberi is also known as cerebral beriberi. Characteristics of wet beriberi include prominent edema and cardiac involvement, whereas dry beriberi is mainly characterized by a polyneuritis.

In industrialized nations, thiamine deficiency is a clinically significant problem in individuals with chronic alcoholism or other disorders that interfere with normal ingestion of food. Thiamine deficiency within developed nations tends to manifest as Wernicke–Korsakoff syndrome. Chronic alcoholism can disrupt thiamin absorption and thiamin deficiency contributes to neurodegeneration and memory loss in alcoholics known as Wernicke's encephalopathy. Individuals with chronic alcoholism may fall short on minimum daily requirements of thiamine in part due to anorexia, erratic eating habits, lack of available food, or a combination of any of these factors. Thiamine deficiency has been reported in up to 80% of alcoholic patients due to inadequate nutritional intake, reduced absorption, and impaired utilization of thiamine. Alcohol, in combination with its metabolite acetaldehyde, interacts with thiamine utilization at the molecular level during transport, diphosphorylation, and modification processes. For this reason, chronic alcoholics may have insufficient thiamine for maintenance of normal brain function, even with seemingly adequate dietary intake.

==== Symptoms ====
Clinical signs of B_{1} deficiency include mental changes such as apathy, decrease in short-term memory, confusion, and irritability. Moderate deficiency in thiamine may reduce growth in young populations, in increase chronic illness in both young and middle-aged adults. In addition, moderate deficiency of thiamine may increase rates of depression, dementia, falls, and fractures in old age.

The lingering symptoms of neuropathy associated with cerebral beriberi are known as Korsakoff's syndrome, or the chronic phase of Wernicke-Korsakoff's. Wernicke encephalopathy is a neurological disorder resulting from a deficiency in thiamine, sharing the same predominant features of cerebral beriberi, as characterized by ocular abnormalities, ataxia of gait, a global state of confusion, and neuropathy. The state of confusion associated with Wernicke's may consist of apathy, inattention, spatial disorientation, inability to concentrate, and mental sluggishness or restlessness. Clinical diagnosis of Wernicke's disease cannot be made without evidence of ocular disturbance, yet these criteria may be too rigid. Korsakoff's likely represents a variation in the clinical manifestation of Wernicke encephalopathy, as they both share similar pathological origin.

Korsakoff's syndrome is often characterized by confabulation, disorientation, and profound amnesia. Characteristics of the neuropathology are varied, but generally consist of bilaterally symmetrical midline lesions of brainstem areas, including the mammillary bodies, thalamus, periaqueductal region, hypothalamus, and the cerebellar vermis.

==== Treatment ====
Immediate treatment of Wernicke encephalopathy involves the administration of intravenous thiamine, followed with long-term treatment and prevention of the disorder through oral thiamine supplements, alcohol abstinence, and a balanced diet. Improvements in brain functioning of chronic alcoholics may occur with abstinence-related treatment, involving the discontinuation of alcohol consumption and improved nutrition. Wernicke's encephalopathy is life-threatening if left untreated. However, a rapid reversal of symptoms may result from prompt administration of thiamine.

==== Prevention ====
Fortification of flour is practiced in some countries to replace the thiamine lost during processing. However, this method has been criticized for missing the target population of chronic alcoholics, who are most at risk for deficiency. Alternative solutions have suggested the fortification of alcoholic beverages with thiamine.

Ingesting a diet rich in thiamine may stave off the adverse effects of deficiency. Foods providing rich sources of thiamine include unrefined grain products, ready-to-eat cereals, meat (especially pork), dairy products, peanuts, legumes, fruits and eggs.

=== Niacin (vitamin B3) ===
Vitamin B_{3}, also known as niacin, includes both nicotinamide as well as nicotinic acid, both of which function in many biological oxidization and reduction reactions within the body. These functions include the biochemical degradation of carbohydrates, fats and proteins. Niacin is also involved in the synthesis of fatty acids and cholesterol, which are known mediators of brain biochemistry, and in effect, of cognitive function.

Sufficient niacin intake is either obtained from diet, or synthesized from the amino acid tryptophan.

==== Deficiencies ====
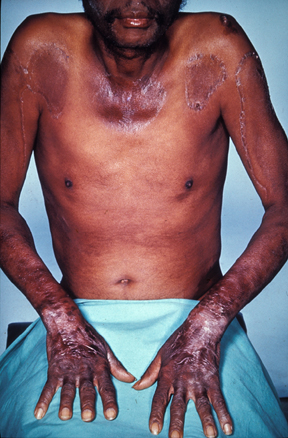
Pellagra initially presents as dermatitis

Severe niacin deficiency typically manifests itself as the disease pellagra. Synthesis of B_{3} from tryptophan involves vitamin B_{2} and B_{6}, so deficiencies in either of these nutrients can lead to niacin deficiency. An excess of leucine, an essential amino acid, in the diet can also interfere with tryptophan conversion and subsequently result in a B_{3} deficiency.

Pellagra is most common to populations within developing countries in which corn is the dietary staple. The disease has virtually disappeared from industrialized countries, yet still appears in India and parts of China and Africa. This is in part due to the bound form of niacin that unprocessed corn contains, which is not readily absorbed into the human body. The processes involved in making corn tortillas, can release the bound niacin into a more absorbable form. Pellagra is not problematic in countries which traditionally prepare their corn in this way, but is a problem in other countries where unprocessed corn is main source of caloric intake.

Though pellagra predominantly occurs in developing countries, sporadic cases of pellagra may be observed within industrialized nations, primarily in chronic alcoholics and patients living with functional absorption complications.

==== Symptoms ====
Pellagra is classically characterized by four 4 "D's": diarrhea, dermatitis, dementia, and death. Neuropsychiatric manifestations of pellagra include headache, irritability, poor concentration, anxiety, hallucinations, stupor, apathy, psychomotor unrest, photophobia, tremor, ataxia, spastic paresis, fatigue, and depression. Symptoms of fatigue and insomnia may progress to encephalopathy characterized by confusion, memory loss, and psychosis.

Those affected by pellagra may undergo pathological alterations in the nervous system. Findings may include demylenation and degeneration of various affected parts of the brain, spinal cord, and peripheral nerves.

==== Treatment ====
Prognosis of deficiency is excellent with treatment. Without, pellagra will gradually progress and lead to death within 4–5 years, often a result of malnutrition from prolonged diarrhea, or complications as caused by concurrent infections or neurological symptoms. Symptoms of pellagra can be cured with exogenous administration of nicotinic acid or nicotinamide.

Flushing occurs in many patients treated therapeutically with nicotinic acid, and as a result, nicotinamide holds more clinical value as it is not associated with the same uncomfortable flushing. The adult dose of nicotinamide is 100 mg taken orally every 6 hours until resolution of major acute symptoms, followed with oral administration of 50 mg every 8–12 hours until skin lesions heal. For children, treatment involves oral ingestion of 10–15 mg of nicotinamide, depending on weight, every 6 hours until signs and symptoms are resolved. Severe cases require 1 gram every 3–4 hours, administered parenterally.

Oral nicotinamide has been promoted as an over-the-counter drug for the treatment of Alzheimer's dementia. Conversely, no clinically significant effect has been found for the drug, as nicotinamide administration has not been found to promote memory functions in patients with mild to moderate dementia of either Alzheimer's, vascular, or fronto-temporal types. This evidence suggests that nicotinamide may treat dementia as related to pellagra, but administration does not effectively treat other types of dementia.

==== Prevention ====
The best method of prevention is to eat foods rich in B_{3}. Generally, this involves the intake of a protein-rich diet. Foods that contain high concentrations of niacin in the free form include beans and organ meat, as well as enriched grain and cereal products. While niacin is present in corn and other grains, the bioavailability of the nutrient is much less than it is in protein-rich sources. Different methods of processing corn may result in a higher degree of bioavailability of the vitamin.

Though treatment with niacin does little to alter the effects of Alzheimer's dementia, niacin intake from foods is inversely associated with the disease.

=== Folate (vitamin B9) ===
Folate deficiency can disrupt neurulation and neurogenesis. Maternal folic acid intake around the time of conception prevents neural tube defects. Furthermore, folic acid intake was recently associated with incidence of autism. Enriched white flour is fortified with folic acid in the United States and many other countries. However the European Union does not have mandatory folic acid fortification. Although the protective effects of folic acid are well documented, there remains legitimate concern that fortification could lead to toxic levels in a subset of the population. For example, elevated levels of folic acid can interact with vitamin B12 deficiency to cause neurodegeneration. Furthermore, folic acid and iron can interact to exacerbate malaria.

Folic acid is the most oxidized and stable form of folate, and can also be referred to as vitamin B_{9}. It rarely occurs naturally in foods, but it is the form used in vitamin supplements as well as fortified food products.

Folate coenzymes are involved in numerous conversion processes within the body, including DNA synthesis and amino acid interconversions. Folate and vitamin B_{12} play a vital role in the synthesis of S-adenosylmethionine, which is of key importance in the maintenance and repairment of all cells, including neurons. In addition, folate has been linked to the maintenance of adequate brain levels of cofactors necessary for chemicals reactions that lead to the synthesis of serotonin and catecholamine neurotransmitters.

Folate has a major, but indirect role in activities which help to direct gene expression and cell proliferation. These activities occur at a greatly increased rate during pregnancy, and depend on adequate levels of folate within blood plasma.

Concentrations of blood plasma folate and homocysteine concentrations are inversely related, such that an increase in dietary folate decreases homocysteine concentration. Thus, dietary intake of folate is a major determinant of homocysteine levels within the body.

Autoantibodies against folate receptor alpha have been found in up to 75% of children with autism.

==== Deficiencies ====
Folate deficiency most commonly arises from insufficient folate intake from the diet, but may also stem from inefficient absorption or metabolic utilization of folate, usually a result of genetic variation. The relationship between folate and B_{12} is so interdependent that deficiency in either vitamin can result in megaloblastic anemia, characterized by organic mental change.

The process of neural tube transformation into structures that will eventually develop into the central nervous system is known as neurulation, the success of which is dependent on the presence of folate within the body. This process begins in the human approximately 21 days after conception, and is completed by 28 days. Thus, a woman may not even be aware of her pregnancy by the time the process of neurulation is complete, potentially causing severe consequences in the development of the fetus.

Functional problems in the absorption and utilization of vitamins may also play a role in folate deficiencies within the elderly.

==== Symptoms ====
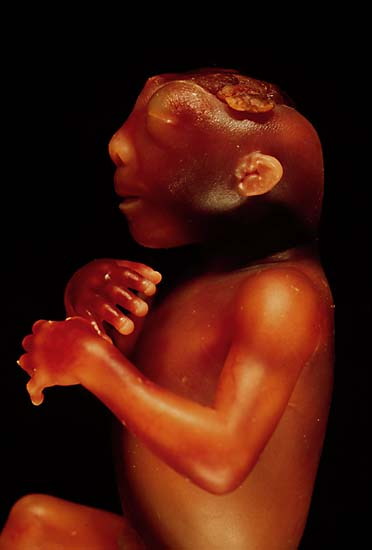
Anencephaly is the most common presentation of neural tube defects

The link between levels of folate and altered mental function is not large, but is sufficient to suggest a causal association. Deficiency in folate can cause an elevation of homocysteine within the blood, as the clearance of homocysteine requires enzymatic action dependent on folate, and to a lesser extent, vitamins B_{6} and B_{12}. Elevated homocysteine has been associated with increased risk of vascular events, as well as dementia.

Differences lie in the presentation of megaloblastic anemia induced by either folate or B_{12} deficiency. Megaloblastic anemia related to deficiency in B_{12} generally results in peripheral neuropathy, whereas folate-related anemia often results in affective, or mood disorders. Neurological effects are not often associated with folate-related megaloblastic anemia, although demyelinating disorders may eventually present. In one study, mood disturbances were recorded for the majority of patients presenting with megaloblastic anemia in the absence of B_{12} deficiency. In addition, folate concentrations within blood plasma have been found to be lower in patients with both unipolar and bipolar depressive disorders when compared with control groups. In addition, depressive groups with low folate concentrations responded less well to standard antidepressant therapy than did those with normal levels within plasma. However, replication of these findings are less robust.

The role of folic acid during pregnancy is vital to normal development of the nervous system in the fetus. A deficiency in folate levels of a pregnant woman could potentially result in neural tube disorder, a debilitating condition in which the tubes of the central nervous system do not fuse entirely. NTDs are not to be confused with spina bifida, which does not involve neural elements. Neural tube defects can present in a number of ways as a result of the improper closure at various points of the neural tube. The clinical spectrum of the disorder includes encephalocele, craniorachischisis, and anencephaly. In addition, these defects can also be classified as open, if neural tissue is exposed or covered only by membrane, or can be classified as closed, if the tissue is covered by normal skin.

Intake of the vitamin has been linked to deficits in learning and memory, particularly within the elderly population. Elderly people deficient in folate may present with deficits in free recall and recognition, which suggests that levels of folate may be related to efficacy of episodic memory.

==== Prevention ====
Because neurulation may be completed before pregnancy is recognized, it is recommended that women capable of becoming pregnant take about 400μg of folic acid from fortified foods, supplements, or a combination of the two in order to reduce the risk of neural tube defects. These major anomalies in the nervous system can be reduced by 85% with systematic folate supplementation occurring before the onset of pregnancy.

The incidence of Alzheimer's and other cognitive diseases has been loosely connected to deficiencies in folate. It is recommended for the elderly to consume folate through food, fortified or not, and supplements in order to reduce risk of developing the disease. Good sources of folate include liver, ready-to-eat breakfast cereals, beans, asparagus, spinach, broccoli, and orange juice.

=== Choline ===
Choline is an important methyl donor involved in one-carbon metabolism that also becomes incorporated into phospholipids and the neurotransmitter acetylcholine. Because of its role in cellular synthesis, choline is an important nutrient during the prenatal and early postnatal development of offspring as it contributes heavily to the development of the brain. A study found that rats that were given supplements of choline in utero or in the weeks following birth had superior memories. The changes appeared to be a result of physical changes to the hippocampus, the area of the brain responsible for memory. Furthermore, choline can reduce some of the deleterious effects of folate deficiency on neurogenesis.

While choline during development is important, adult levels of choline are also important. Choline has been shown to increase the synthesis and release of acetylcholine from neurons, which in turn increases memory. A double-blind study was conducted using normal college students (no neurological disorders). Results showed that twenty-five grams of phosphatidylcholine (another form of choline) created a significant improvement in explicit memory, measured by a serial learning task, however this improvement may be attributed to the improvement of slow learners. Another study found that a single ten-gram oral dose of choline, given to normal volunteers (again, without neurological disorders) significantly decreased the number of trials needed to master a serial-learning word test. This increase in memory is particularly beneficial to memory loss experienced by old age. A study conducted on rats who, like humans, had an age-related loss of memory were tested on how choline affected memory. The results showed that rats who had a chronic low-choline diet showed greater memory loss then their same-age control counterparts, while rats who had choline-enriched diets showed a diminished memory loss compared to both the choline-low diet and control rat groups. Furthermore, young rats who were choline-deficient performed as poorly on memory tasks as older rats while older rats that were given choline supplements performed as well as three-month-old rats.

==== Deficiencies and treatments ====
Despite the wide range of foods that choline is found in, studies have shown that the mean choline intake of men, women and children are below the Adequate Intake levels. Not enough choline is naturally produced by the body, so diet is an important factor. People who consume a large quantity of alcohol may be at an increased risk for choline deficiency. Sex and age also plays a role, with premenopausal females being less sensitive to choline deficiency than either males or postmenopausal females. This has been theorized to be a result of premenopausal women having an increased ability to synthesize choline in some form, which has been confirmed in studies on rats. In such instances of deficiency, choline supplements or (if able) dietary changes may be beneficial. Good sources of choline include liver, milk, eggs and peanuts. There is further evidence to suggest that choline supplements can be used to treat people who have neurological disorders as well we memory defects. Oral doses of CDP-choline (another form of choline) given to elderly subjects with memory deficits, but without dementia, for four weeks showed improved memory in free recall tasks, but not in recognition tests. In a second study, patients with early Alzheimer-type dementia were treated with twenty-give gram doses of phosphatidylcholine every day for six months. Slightly improvements were shown in memory tests compared to the placebo control group. Other studies conducted did not find any such improvement.

=== Cobalamin (vitamin B12) ===
Also known as cobalamin, B_{12} is an essential vitamin necessary for normal blood formation. It is also important for the maintenance of neurological function and psychiatric health. The absorption of B_{12} into the body requires adequate amounts of intrinsic factor, the glycoprotein produced in the parietal cells of the stomach lining. A functioning small intestine is also necessary for the proper metabolism of the vitamin, as absorption occurs within the ileum.

B_{12} is produced in the digestive tracts of all animals, including humans. Thus, animal-origin food is the only natural food source of vitamin B_{12} However, synthesis of B_{12} occurs in the large intestine, which is past the point of absorption that occurs within the small intestine. As such, vitamin B_{12} must be obtained through diet.

==== Deficiencies ====
Unlike other B vitamins which are not stored in the body, B_{12} is stored in the liver. Because of this, it may take 5–10 years before a sudden dietary B_{12} deficiency will become apparent in a previously healthy adult. B_{12} deficiency, also known as hypocobalaminemia, often results from complications involving absorption into the body.

B_{12} deficiency is often associated with pernicious anemia, as it is the most common cause. Pernicious anemia results from an autoimmune disorder which destroys the cells that produce intrinsic factor within the stomach lining, thereby hindering B_{12} absorption. B_{12} absorption is important for the subsequent absorption of iron, thus, people with pernicious anemia often present with typical symptoms of anemia, such as pale skin, dizziness, and fatigue.

Among those at highest risk for B_{12} deficiency are the elderly population, as 10-15% of people aged 60+ may present with some form of hypocobalaminemia. High rates of deficiency in the elderly commonly results from the decrease of functional absorption of B_{12}, as production of intrinsic factor declines with age. However, pernicious anemia is the most common cause of B_{12} deficiency in North American and European populations.

Those affected by various gastrointestinal diseases may also be at risk for deficiency as a result of malabsorption. These diseases may affect production of intrinsic factor in the stomach, or of pancreatic bile. Diseases that involve disorders of the small intestine, such as celiac disease, Crohn's disease and ileitis, may also reduce B_{12} absorption. For example, people with celiac disease may damage the microvilli within their small intestines through the consumption of gluten, thereby inhibiting absorption of B_{12} as well as other nutrients.

A diet low in B_{12}, whether voluntary or not, can also cause symptoms of hypocobalaminemia. Many rich sources of B_{12} come from animal meats and by-products. Populations in developing countries may not have access to these foods on a consistent basis, and as a result may become deficient in B_{12}. In addition, vegans, and to a lesser extent vegetarians, are at risk for consuming a diet low in cobalamin as they voluntarily abstain from animal sources of B_{12}. A combination of these two scenarios may increase prevalence of cobalamin deficit. For instance, B_{12} deficiency is problematic in India, where the majority of the population is vegetarian and the scarcity of meat consumption is common for omnivores as well.

==== Symptoms ====
An assortment of neurological effects can be observed in 75-90% of individuals of any age with clinically observable B_{12} deficiency. Cobalamin deficiency manifestations are apparent in the abnormalities of the spinal cord, peripheral nerves, optic nerves, and cerebrum. These abnormalities involve a progressive degeneration of myelin, and may be expressed behaviourally through reports of sensory disturbances in the extremities, or motor disturbances, such as gait ataxia. Combined myelopathy and neuropathy are prevalent within a large percentage of cases. Cognitive changes may range from loss of concentration to memory loss, disorientation, and dementia. All of these symptoms may present with or without additional mood changes. Mental symptoms are extremely variable, and include mild disorders of mood, mental slowness, and memory defect. Memory defect encompasses symptoms of confusion, severe agitation and depression, delusions and paranoid behaviour, visual and auditory hallucinations, urinary and fecal incontinence in the absence of overt spinal lesions, dysphasia, violent maniacal behaviour, and epilepsy. It has been suggested that mental symptoms could be related to a decrease in cerebral metabolism, as caused by the state of deficiency. All of these symptoms may present with or without additional mood changes.

Mild to moderate cases of pernicious anemia may show symptoms of bleeding gums, headache, poor concentration, shortness of breath, and weakness. In severe cases of pernicious anemia, individuals may present with various cognitive problems such as dementia, and memory loss.

It is not always easy to determine whether B_{12} deficiency is present, especially within older adults. Patients may present with violent behaviour or more subtle personality changes. They may also present with vague complaints, such as fatigue or memory loss, that may be attributed to normative aging processes. Cognitive symptoms may mimic behaviour in Alzheimer's and other dementias as well. Tests must be run on individuals presenting with such signs to confirm or negate cobalamin deficiency within the blood.

==== Treatment ====
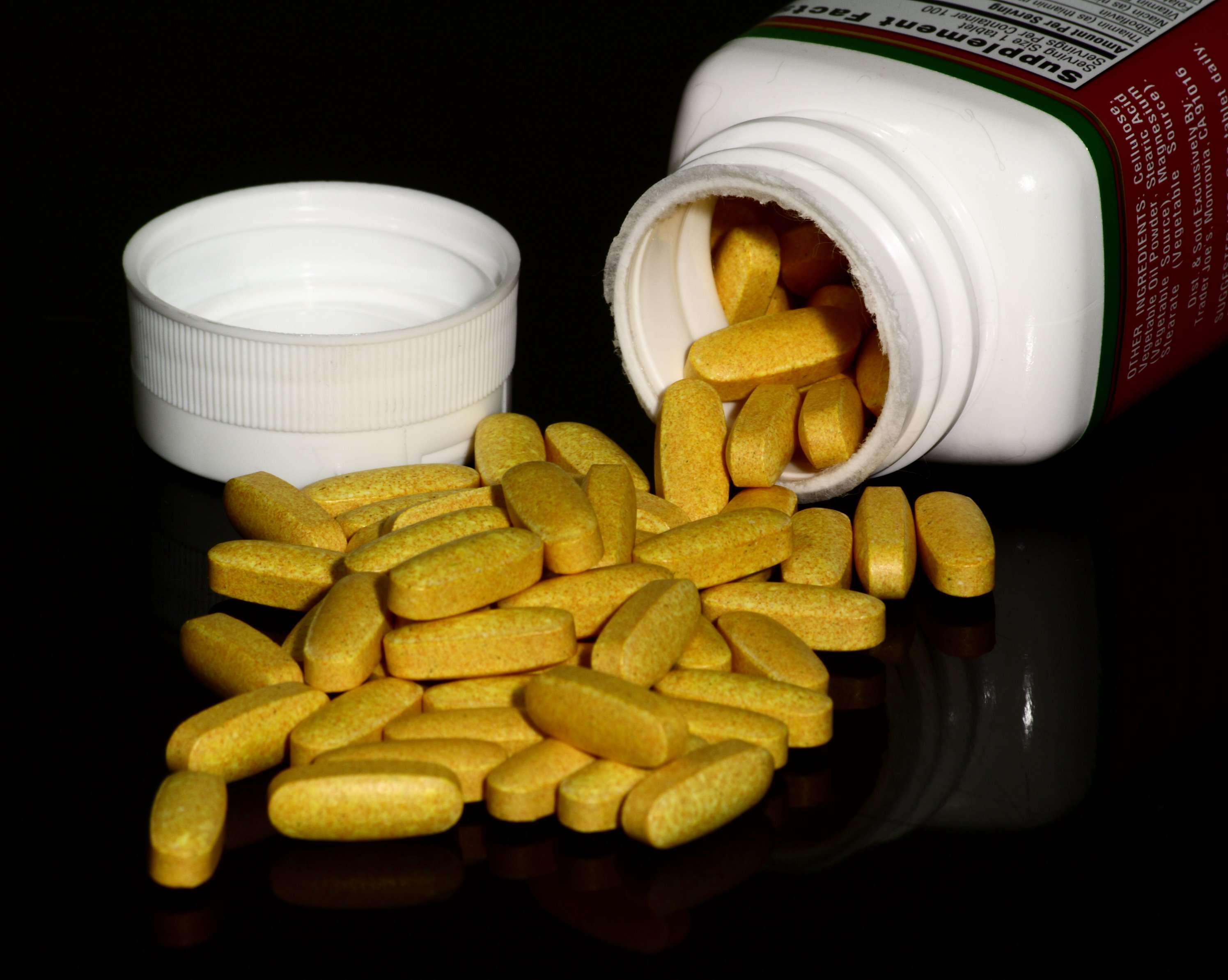
Individuals with absorption disorders, or those who abstain from animal products should supplement their diet with B_{12} regularly

Patients deficient in B_{12} despite normal absorption functionality may be treated through oral administration of at least 6 mg of the vitamin in pill form. Patients who have irreversible causes of deficiency, such as pernicious anemia or old age, will need lifelong treatment with pharmacological doses of B_{12}. Strategy for treatment is dependent on the patient's level of deficiency as well as their level of cognitive functioning. Treatment for those with severe deficiency involves 1000 mg of B_{12} administered intramuscularly daily for one week, weekly for one month, then monthly for the rest of the patient's life. Daily oral supplementation of B_{12} mega-doses may be sufficient in reliable patients, but it is imperative that the supplementation be continued on a lifelong basis as relapse may occur otherwise.

The progression of neurological manifestations of cobalamin deficiency is generally gradual. As a result, early diagnosis is important or else irreversible damage may occur. Patients who become demented usually show little to no cognitive improvement with the administration of B_{12}.

A deficiency in folate may produce anemia similar to the anemia resulting from B_{12} deficiency. There is risk that folic acid administered to those with B_{12} deficiency may mask anemic symptoms without solving the issue at hand. In this case, patients would still be at risk for neurological deficits associated with B_{12} deficiency-related anemia, which are not associated with anemia related to folate deficiency.

==== Prevention ====
In addition to meeting intake requirements through food consumption, supplementation of diet with vitamin B_{12} is seen as a viable preventive measure for deficiency. It has been recommended for the elderly to supplement 50 mcg a day in order to prevent deficit from occurring.

Animal protein products are a good source of B_{12}, particularly organ meats such as kidney or liver. Other good sources are fish, eggs, and dairy products. It is suggested that vegans, who consume no animal meat or by-products, supplement their diet with B_{12}. While there are foods fortified with B_{12} available, some may be mislabelled in an attempt to boost their nutritional claims. Products of fermentation, such as algae extracts and sea vegetables, may be labelled as sources of B_{12}, but actually contain B_{12} analogues which compete for the absorption of the nutrient itself. In order to get adequate amounts of the vitamin, orally administered pills or fortified foods such as cereals and soy milk, are recommended for vegans.

=== Vitamin D ===
Vitamin D is an essential regulator of the vitamin D receptor that controls gene transcription during development. The vitamin D receptor is strongly expressed in the substantia nigra. Accordingly, vitamin D deficiency can disrupt neurogenesis leading to altered dopamine signaling and increased exploratory behavior in rats. This is considered a rodent model of the schizophrenia phenotype and vitamin D deficiency has been proposed as an explanation for the increased incidence of schizophrenia among children that were conceived during winter months. A Finnish study found that vitamin D supplement use is associated with reduced risk of schizophrenia.

Vitamin D deficiency may also have downstream effects on neurosteriod synthesis. Vitamin D supplementation appears to increase both free and total testosterone levels in healthy men, with serum vitamin D levels between 70-80 nmol/L having been shown to maximize testosterone production in overweight men. 5a-Androstanediol, a metabolite of testosterone, is a potent positive allosteric modulator of the GABA_{A} receptor. The synthesis of 5a-Androstanediol is generally correlated with that of testosterone production.

== Lipids ==
=== Fat ===
Fatty acids are necessary for the synthesis of cell membranes neurotransmitters and other signaling molecules. While excessive fat intake can be harmful, deficiency of essential fatty acids can disrupt neurodevelopment and synaptic plasticity.

==== Saturated fat ====
Consuming large amounts of saturated fat can negatively affect the brain. Eating foods with saturated fats elevates the level of cholesterol and triglycerides in the body. Studies have shown that high levels of triglycerides strongly link with mood problems such as depression, hostility and aggression. This may occur because high triglyceride levels decrease the amount of oxygen that blood can carry to the brain. The American Heart Association recommends that people consume no more than 16g of saturated fat daily. Common sources of saturated fat are meat and dairy products.

==== Essential fatty acids ====
There are two kinds of essential fatty acids that people must consume (omega-3 and omega-6). Many academics recommend a balanced amount of omega-3s and omega-6s. However, some estimate that Americans consume twenty times more omega-6s than omega-3s. There is a theory that an imbalance of essential fatty acids may lead to mental disorders such as depression, hyperactivity and schizophrenia, but it still lacking evidences. An omega-3 deficient diet increases omega-6 levels in the brain disrupting endocannabinoid signaling in the prefrontal cortex and nucleus accumbens contributing to anxiety and depression-like behaviors in mice. Sources of omega-3 include flax seeds, chia seeds, walnuts, sea vegetables, green leafy vegetables, and cold water fish. Sources of omega-6 include walnuts, hazelnuts; sunflower, safflower, corn, and sesame oils.

=== Cholesterol ===
While cholesterol is essential for membranes and steroid hormones, excess cholesterol affects blood flow impairing cognitive function in vascular dementia.

== Carbohydrates ==
Studies have shown that learning and memory improve after consuming carbohydrates. There are two kinds of carbohydrates people consume: simple and complex. Simple carbohydrates are often found in processed foods and release sugar into the bloodstream quickly after consumption. Complex carbohydrates are digested more slowly and therefore cause sugar to be released into the bloodstream more slowly. Good sources of complex carbohydrates are whole-grain breads, pasta, brown rice, oatmeal, and potatoes. It is recommended that people consume more complex carbohydrates because consuming complex carbohydrates will cause the level of sugar in the bloodstream to be more stable, which will cause less stress hormones to be released. Consuming simple carbohydrates may cause the levels of sugar in the bloodstream to rise and fall, which can cause mood swings.

=== Low carbohydrate ketogenic diets ===
The ketone body beta-hydroxybutyrate is a fuel source for the brain during times of fasting when blood glucose levels fall. Although the mechanism is not understood, it is well established that eating a diet low in carbohydrates can be therapeutic for children with epilepsy. This is likely a result of ketone bodies providing an alternative fuel source to glucose for neuronal function. Furthermore, a ketogenic diet can be beneficial for dementia patients. Medium-chain triglycerides can stimulate ketone synthesis and coconut oil is a rich source of medium chain triglycerides that several anecdotal reports suggest can improve cognitive function in Alzheimer's type dementia patients.

== Protein ==
When protein is consumed, it is broken down into amino acids. These amino acids are used to produce many things like neurotransmitters, enzymes, hormones, and chromosomes. Proteins known as complete proteins contain all eight of the essential amino acids. Meat, cheese, eggs, and yogurt are all examples of complete proteins. Incomplete proteins contain only some of the eight essential amino acids and it is recommended that people consume a combination of these proteins. Examples of incomplete proteins include nuts, seeds, legumes, and grains. When animals are fed a diet deficient in essential amino acids, uncharged tRNAs accumulate in the anterior piriform cortex signaling diet rejection [105]. The body normally interconverts amino acids to maintain homeostasis, but muscle protein can be catabolized to release amino acids during conditions of amino acid deficiency. Disruption of amino acid metabolism can affect brain development and neurophysiology to affect behavior. For example, fetal protein deficiency decreases the number of neurons in the CA1 region of the hippocampus.

=== Glutamate ===
Glutamate is a proteinogenic amino acid and neurotransmitter, though it is perhaps publicly best known in its sodium salt form: monosodium glutamate (MSG). It is also a flavor on its own, producing the umami or savory flavor found in many fermented foods such as cheese. As an amino acid it acts as a source of fuel for various cellular functions and as a neurotransmitter. Glutamate operates as an excitatory neurotransmitter and is released when a nerve impulse excites a glutamate producing cell. This in turn binds to neurons with glutamate receptors, stimulating them.

==== Deficiencies and treatments ====
Glutamate is a nutrient that is extremely difficult to be deficient in, as, being an amino acid, it is found in every food that contains protein. Additionally it is found, as previously mentioned, in fermented foods and in foods containing monosodium glutamate. As such, good sources of glutamate include meat, fish, dairy products and a wide array of other foods. Glutamate is also absorbed extremely efficiently by the intestines. However, there are instances of glutamate deficiency occurring, but only in cases where genetic disorders are present. One such example is Glutamate formiminotransferase deficiency and can cause either minor or profound physical and intellectual disabilities, depending on the severity of the condition. This disorder is extremely rare however, as only twenty people have so far been identified with this condition. Glutamate, while critically important in the body also acts as an excitotoxin in high concentrations not normally found outside of laboratory conditions, although it can occur following brain injury or spinal cord injury.

=== Phenylalanine ===
L-Phenylalanine is biologically converted into L-tyrosine, another one of the DNA-encoded amino acids, and beta-phenethylamine. L-tyrosine in turn is converted into L-DOPA, which is further converted into dopamine, norepinephrine (noradrenaline), and epinephrine (adrenaline). The latter three are known as the catecholamines. Phenethylamine is further converted into N-methylphenethylamine. Phenylalanine uses the same active transport channel as tryptophan to cross the blood–brain barrier, and, in large quantities, interferes with the production of serotonin.

==== Phenylketonuria ====
Toxic levels of phenylalanine accumulate in the brains of patients with phenylketonuria leading to severe brain damage and intellectual disability. To prevent brain damage, these individuals can restrict dietary phenylalanine intake by avoiding protein and supplementing their diet with essential amino acids.

== See also ==
- Nutrition and cognition
- Impact of nutrition on intelligence
- Orthomolecular psychiatry
