= Preventive nutrition =

Branch of nutrition science

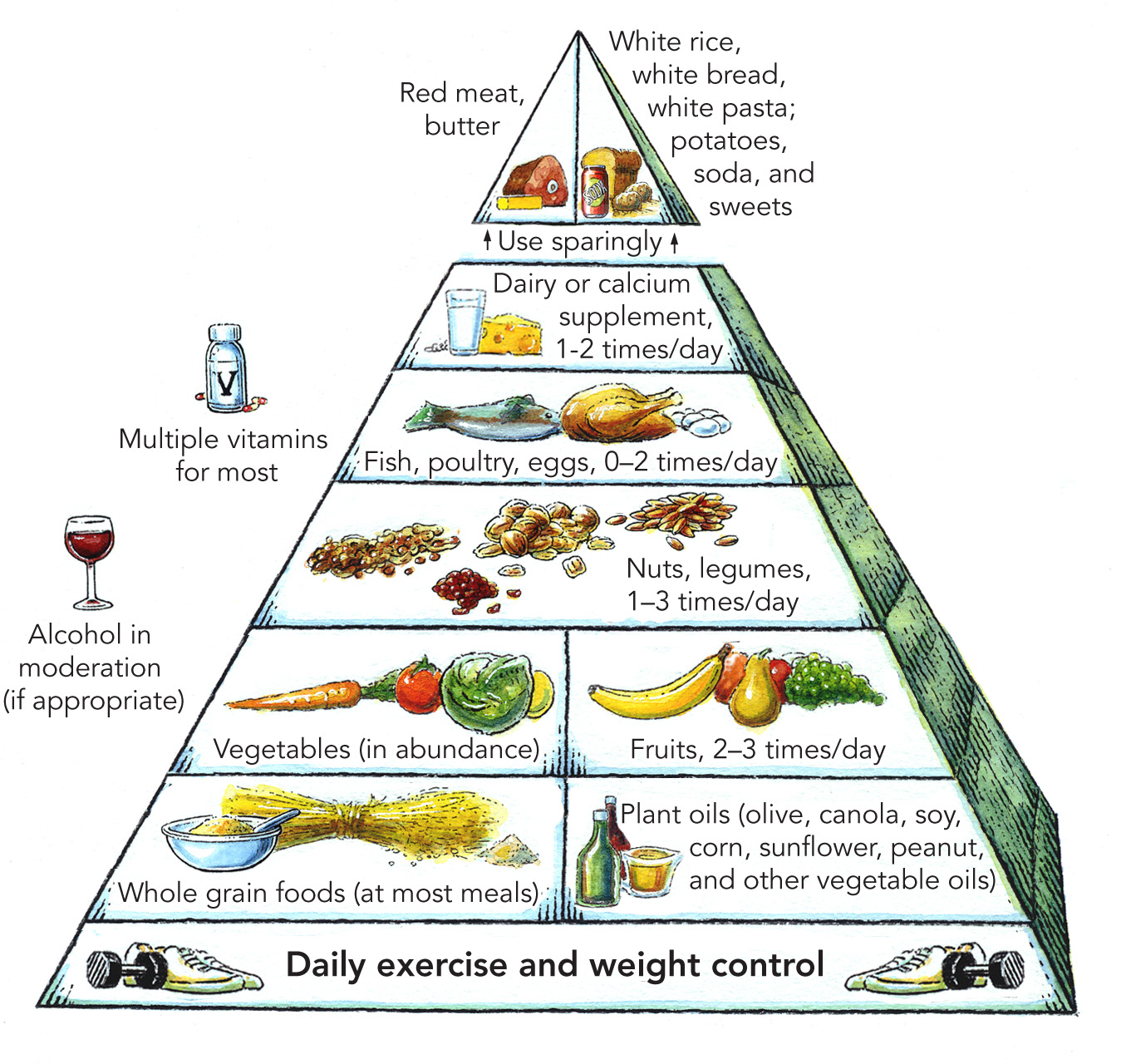
Mediterranean Diet Pyramid

Preventive nutrition is a branch of nutrition science with the goal of preventing, delaying, and/or reducing the impacts of disease and disease-related complications. It is concerned with a high level of personal well-being, disease prevention, and diagnosis of recurring health problems or symptoms of discomfort which are often precursors to health issues. The overweight and obese population numbers have increased over the last 40 years and numerous chronic diseases are associated with obesity. Preventive nutrition may assist in prolonging the onset of non-communicable diseases and may allow adults to experience more "healthy living years." There are various ways of educating the public about preventive nutrition. Information regarding preventive nutrition is often communicated through public health forums, government programs and policies, or nutritional education. For example, in the United States, preventive nutrition is taught to the public through the use of the food pyramid or MyPlate initiatives.

== History ==
Preventive nutrition has been known about for a long time. The philosopher Hippocrates (460-377 BC) believed that nutrition had a significant impact on maintaining health and that the best way to prevent diseases was to "let food be your medicine and medicine be your food." Meyer-Abich (2005) also believed that nutrition was foundational to a healthy life. He took a holistic approach to health and discussed the essential role of nutrition in his paper, "Human health in nature - towards a holistic philosophy of nutrition."

Since the early 1980s, food trends have changed. The introduction of processed foods gained fast popularization. During the commercialization and industrialization of food, the demand for processed, prepackaged, convenient food such as beef in fast food increased. Farmers began to industrially farm livestock to produce more meat due to industry demand. As a result, livestock feed is often corn, soy, and grain. Compared to grass-fed beef, grain-fed beef is higher in saturated fatty acids along with a less favorable omega fatty acids profile. Processed, prepackaged, and convenient food options often contain high amounts of sugar, sodium, and fat, and are associated with the development of poor health outcomes.

== Disease prevention ==
Although life expectancy has increased over the years, the number of "healthy years" has not. There is a rising prevalence of nutrition related diseases in the world today. Chronic disease epidemics associated with nutrition including obesity, type 2 diabetes, osteoporosis, cardiovascular disease, and cancers are increasing. According to the World Health Organization, the proportion of people with obesity has almost tripled since 1975. A survey conducted in China among the hypertensive population highlights that obesity contributes to the development of hypertension. Only about half the participants were aware of their hypertension diagnosis and only 20.3% had controlled hypertension. The article also showed a correlation between poor hypertension control and obesity. Preventive nutrition may be a helpful strategy to help control obesity and chronic non-communicable diseases. In those with obesity, a weight reduction of 10% has been demonstrated to prevent non-communicable diseases and increase life expectancy. The Mediterranean diet has been investigated in many studies as a tool for weight loss. Results show that adhering to a Mediterranean diet causes weight loss and decreases fat mass which prevents or reduces the risk of non-communicable disease, including type 2 diabetes and cardiovascular disease. It is also associated with a reduced risk of mortality in certain populations, including those with obesity, hypertension, type 2 diabetes, and cardiovascular disease.

== Implementation ==
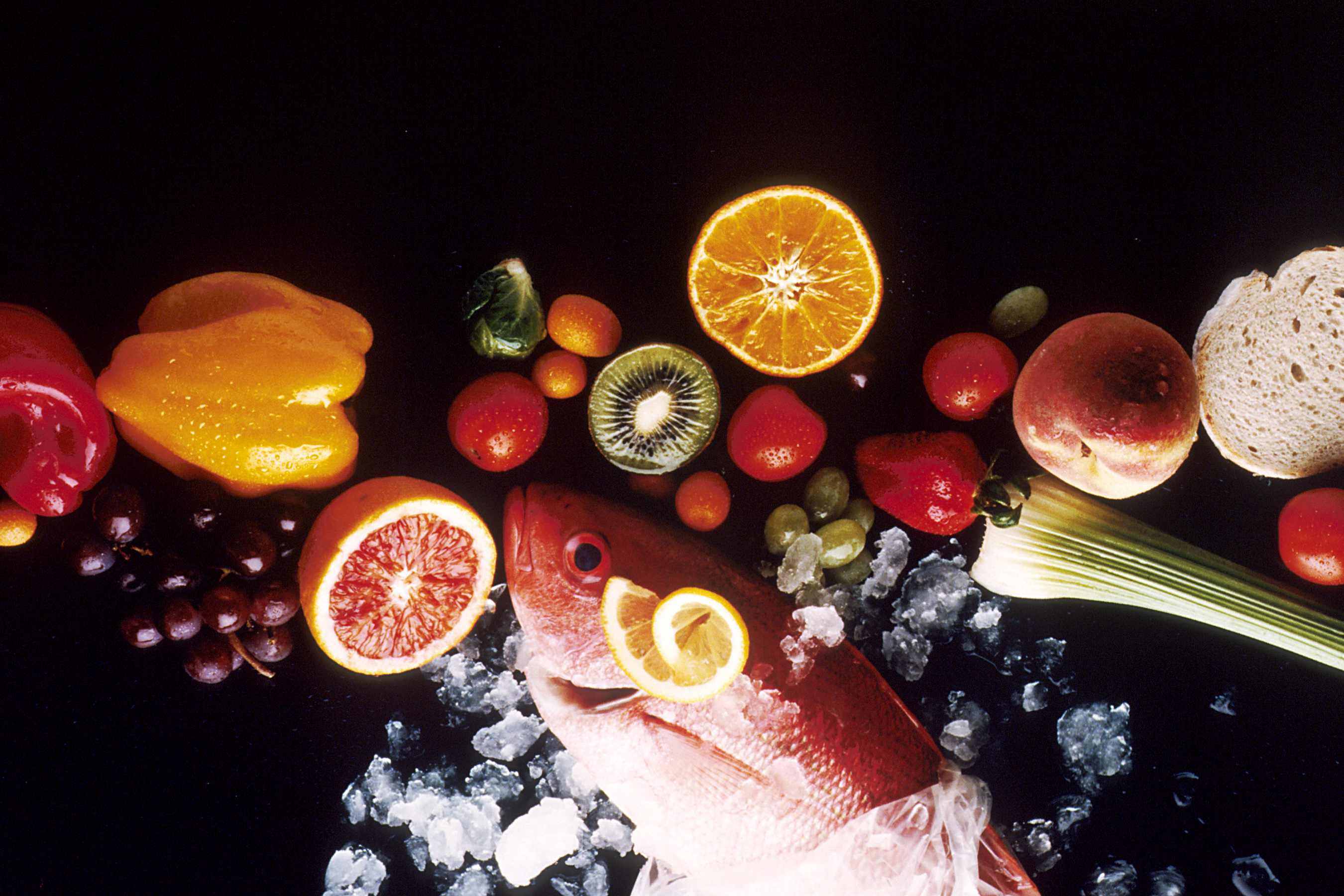
Examples of foods included in the Mediterranean Diet

Diets with low nutrient dense products (e.g. highly processed foods) have increased, and in Western countries, approximately 2/3 of adults are obese. The risk of developing a chronic disease such as type 2 diabetes, hypertension, cardiovascular disease, non-alcoholic fatty liver disease, cancer, depression, and osteoarthritis is higher in those with obesity (i.e. BMI over 30) and increases healthcare costs. Several diets have been studied to analyze their effect on weight loss and prevention of chronic diseases. These include, the ketogenic diet, low fat diets, low carbohydrate diets, the Mediterranean diet, and many more. The ketogenic diet has been scientifically validated for its effectiveness in enhancing glycemic control among individuals with type 2 diabetes and those who are at risk of developing the disease. This dietary approach helps individuals improve insulin resistance and blood glucose control.

The Mediterranean diet was first examined in the 1950s with the Seven Countries Study in Greece and Italy after World War II. Compared to Western countries, a low incidence of heart disease and cancer was observed. Although it is not the only diet shown to help with weight loss and improve health outcomes, it has been studied extensively and has the most available evidence supporting its use to prevent non-communicable diseases. In general, the Mediterranean diet consists of high intakes of fruit, vegetables, seeds, nuts, whole grains, fish and other seafood, and extra virgin olive oil as the fat source when cooking. It has a moderate intake of legumes, poultry, eggs, dairy products, and red wine, and a low intake of red or processed meat, animal fat, and high sugar foods.

== Education ==
Extreme diets, such as the ketogenic diet, may potentially have adverse effects and lack data on long-term outcomes. Therefore, it should be used as a tool, rather than a long term solution. An alternative to strict diets or to complement dietary approaches, is cultivating nutritional awareness and making proactive food choices. This is a sustainable method for maintaining good health and contributes to preventive nutrition. Being familiar with nutritional labels can inform dietary choices. Reading these labels increases awareness of the food content and our consumption habits, including quantities and macronutrients. In a four-week randomized control trial assessing the impact of three types of nutrition labels on consumer food purchases, the results indicated that "products for which participants viewed the label and subsequently purchased the product during the same shopping episode were significantly healthier than products where labels were viewed but the product was not subsequently purchased." The objective of preventive nutrition is to continually enhance one's awareness of food quantities, ingredients, and how specific foods impact the body.

== Athletics ==
Athletes are held to a higher standard of nutrition and preventive nutrition contributes to injury prevention in athletes. According to a study done by the National Collegiate Athletic Association, most athletes and coaches do not fully understand or focus on the importance of nutrition. Nutrition contributes to injury prevention as well as exercise capacity. To demonstrate this, a group of high-performance runners completed a fat adaptation carbohydrate restoration (FACR) dietary intervention (five days' carbohydrate < 20% and fat > 60% energy, plus one-day carbohydrate ≥ 70% energy), and a control high-carbohydrate (HCHO) diet for six days (carbohydrate > 60% energy; fat < 20% energy). It was found that, compared to the HCHO diet, the FACR diet improved running economy, which is the efficiency the athlete's body uses energy while running, leading to a faster run time. Although this is a very specific diet, it shows that diet can quickly improve athletic performance. However, there is limited evidence on how diet or nutritional awareness influences athletic performance. Therefore, more research must be done to confirm which diets have a positive or negative impact on exercise performance and injury prevention.

== Limitations ==
Most people are aware that nutrition has an impact on health, but the recommended dietary guidelines are not always followed. According to Kovacs, "one solution to address health concerns is to shift current dietary patterns to diets that are both nutritious and sustainable." Financial limitations, lack of time, and accessibility contribute to poor eating habits and are difficult barriers to overcome. "The poorest who face disproportionate barriers to accessing healthy food have an increased risk of malnutrition". A study was conducted on barriers to healthy eating and showed the correlation between poverty in urban settings, food security, food access, and nutrition. Although it has been suggested that living in urban settings increases access to food, the study concluded that there is a financial limitation to achieving food security that must be addressed. Solutions to these barriers have been suggested, yet it remains a significant limitation to preventive nutrition.

== Future research ==
Although there is evidence that nutrition plays a role in obesity and developing chronic disease, there are many other factors to consider. Unmodifiable risk factors and lifestyle choices may put certain individuals at higher risk, outcomes may differ depending on the chronic disease, and exercise may have contributed to the weight loss observed in studies. For example, the effect of a Mediterranean diet on cardiovascular disease outcomes is uncertain and more research should be carried out to assess its role. A holistic approach to weight loss and chronic disease prevention is important, including preventive nutrition. There is insufficient evidence on which diet will provide the most benefit to individuals. However, there is evidence that a healthy diet is important to maintain or improve overall quality of life.

== See also ==
- Preventive healthcare
- Dietitian specializes in human nutrition.
- Animal nutritionist specializes in animal nutrition.
- Physical activity
- Hippocrates
- The Food Pyramid
- Mediterranean Diet and Mediterranean Diet Pyramid
- Non-communicable diseases
