= Latin American Diet Pyramid =

Nutritional advice guide

The Latin American Diet Pyramid is a nutrition guide that was developed by Oldways and scientific advisers from the Harvard School of Public Health, the Baylor College of Medicine, and the Latin American Summit Scientific Committee in 2005. It is a tradition-based diet that suggests the types and frequency of foods that should be enjoyed every day.

This pyramid is based on two distinct historical periods of the culinary evolution of the peoples of Latin America.

The first period describes the dietary traditions of regions inhabited primarily by three high cultures of aboriginal Latin Americans: the Aztec, the Inca, and the Maya. The second period describes the dietary traditions that emerged following the arrival of Columbus, at about 1500, to the present time. The dietary patterns followed today by the people of Latin America find their roots in both of these historical culinary patterns.

The selection of these peoples and of these time periods as a basis for the design follows from these considerations:

- A consistency with patterns of other healthy population groups of the world;
- Availability of data describing the character of food consumption patterns of the areas at that time; and
- The convergence of the dietary patterns revealed by these data and our current understanding of optimal nutrition based on world-wide epidemiological studies and clinical trials.

Variations of these diets have traditionally existed in other parts of Central America, South America, the Caribbean, and the southern edge United States. For the purposes of this research, the aforementioned regions are considered as part of Latin America. They are closely related to traditional areas of maize, potato, peanut, and dry bean cultivation in the Latin American region.

Given these carefully defined parameters of geography and time, the phrase traditional Latin American diet is used here as a shorthand for those traditional diets of these regions and peoples during two specific time periods that are historically associated with good health.

The design of the Latin American Diet Pyramid is not based solely on either the weight or the percentage of energy (calories) that foods account for in the diet, but on a blend of these that is meant to give relative proportions and a general sense of frequency of servings, as well as an indication of which foods to favour in a healthy Latin American-style diet.

== Resources ==
- National Diabetes Information Clearinghouse. National diabetes statistics. NIH publication 02–3892. 2002. Fact sheet. http://www.niddk.nih.gov/health/diabetes/pubs/dmstats/dmstats.htm. Accessed April 4, 2002.
- Latino Nutrition Coalition
- Latin American Diet Summit Consensus Statement
