= Mediterranean diet =

Diet inspired by the Mediterranean region

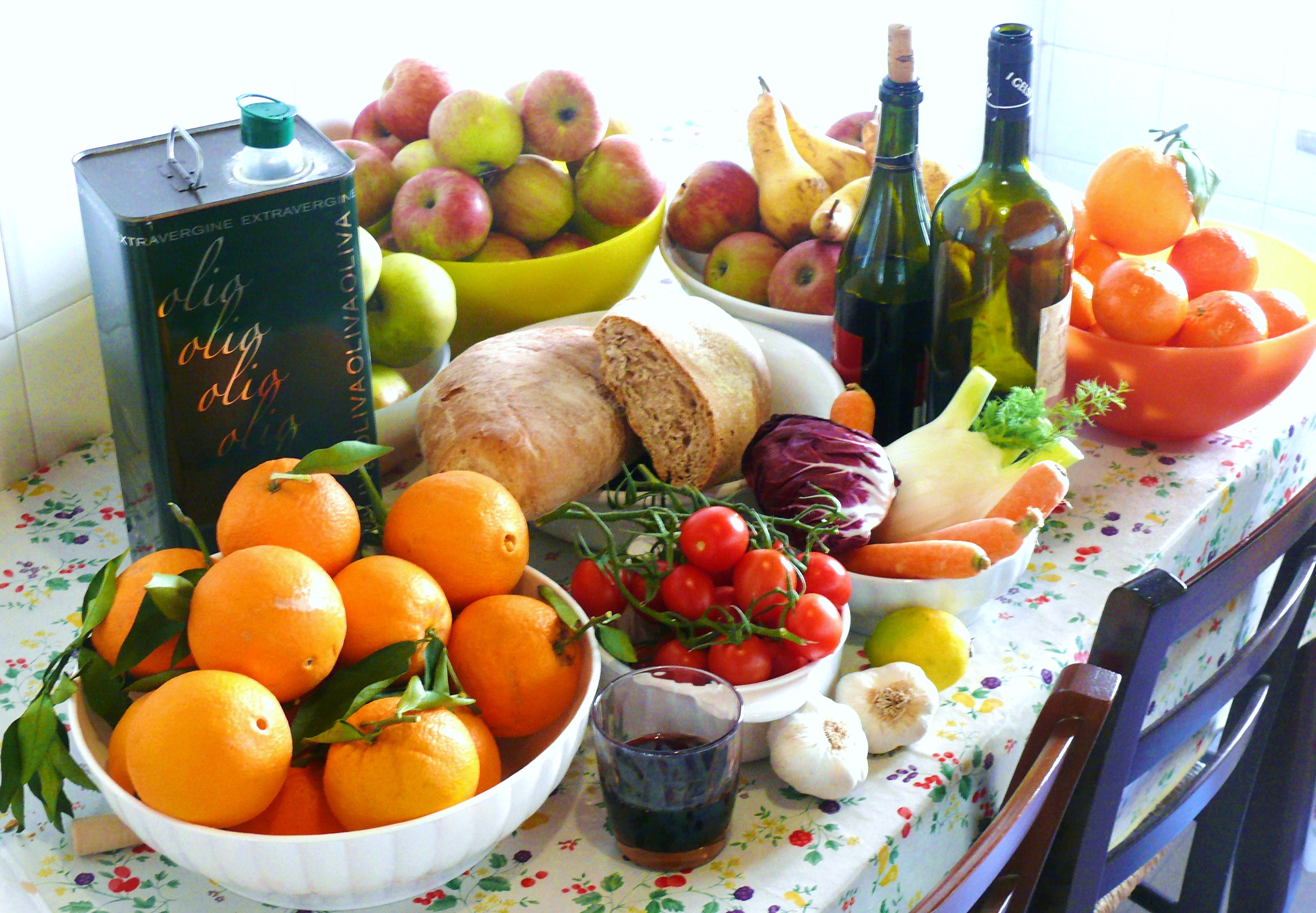
Some ingredients that form a large part of the Mediterranean diet: fruit, vegetables, bread, olive oil and red wine

The Mediterranean diet is a dietary concept that was first proposed in 1975 by American biologist Ancel Keys and chemist Margaret Keys. It is inspired by the eating habits and traditional foods of Greece, Italy and the Mediterranean coasts of France and Spain, as observed in the late 1950s to early 1960s. It is distinct from both Mediterranean cuisine, which encompasses the diverse culinary traditions of Mediterranean countries, and from the Atlantic diet of northwestern Spain and Portugal, albeit with some shared characteristics. The Mediterranean diet is the most well-known and researched dietary pattern in the world.

While based on a specific time and place, the "Mediterranean diet" generically describes an eating pattern that has been refined based on the results of multiple scientific studies. It emphasizes plant-based foods, particularly unprocessed cereals, legumes, vegetables, and fruits; moderate consumption of fish and dairy products (mostly cheese and yogurt); and low amounts of red meat, refined grains, and sugar. Alcohol intake is limited to wine (typically the red variety) consumed in low to moderate amounts, usually with meals. Olive oil is the principal source of fat and has been studied as a potential health factor for reducing all-cause mortality and the risk of chronic diseases.

The Mediterranean diet is associated with a reduction in all-cause mortality in observational studies. A 2017 review provided evidence that the Mediterranean diet lowers the risk of heart disease and early death; it may also help with weight loss in obese people. The Mediterranean diet is one of three healthy diets recommended in the 2015–2020 Dietary Guidelines for Americans, along with the DASH diet and vegetarian diet. It is also recognized by the World Health Organization as a healthy eating pattern.

Mediterranean cuisine and its associated traditions and practices were recognized as an Intangible Cultural Heritage of Humanity by UNESCO in 2010 under the name "Mediterranean Diet". (Note: In Cyprus, Croatia, Greece, Italy, Morocco, Spain, and Portugal) The Mediterranean diet is sometimes broadened to include particular lifestyle habits, social behaviors, and cultural values closely associated with certain Mediterranean countries, such as simple but varied cooking methods, communal meals, post-lunch naps, and regular physical activity.

== Health effects ==
=== Food research ===
The Mediterranean diet is low in saturated fat with high amounts of monounsaturated fat and dietary fiber. One possible factor is the potential health effects of olive oil in the Mediterranean diet. Olive oil contains monounsaturated fats, most notably oleic acid, which is under clinical research for its potential health benefits. The European Food Safety Authority Panel on Dietetic Products, Nutrition and Allergies approved health claims on olive oil, for protection by its polyphenols against oxidation of blood lipids and for the contribution to the maintenance of normal blood LDL-cholesterol levels by replacing saturated fats in the diet with oleic acid (Commission Regulation (EU) 432/2012 of 16 May 2012). A 2014 meta-analysis concluded that an elevated consumption of olive oil is associated with reduced risk of all-cause mortality, cardiovascular events and stroke, while monounsaturated fatty acids of mixed animal and plant origin showed no significant effects.

The United States 2015–2020 national guidelines devised a "Healthy Mediterranean-Style Eating Pattern" from the Mediterranean diet patterns and its positive health outcomes. It was designed from the "Healthy U.S.-Style Eating Pattern", but recommends more fruits and seafood, and less dairy. A 2020 review of research on the Mediterranean diet indicated that it may optimize cardiovascular health.

=== Overall health and disease risk ===
Review studies from 2017 and 2022 found evidence that practice of a Mediterranean diet could lead to reduced risk of cardiovascular diseases, overall cancer incidence, neurodegenerative diseases, diabetes, and early death. A 2018 review showed that practice of the Mediterranean diet may improve overall health status, such as reduced risk of non-infectious diseases, may reduce total costs of living, and may reduce costs for national healthcare. A 2016 review found similar weight loss as other diets.

=== Cardiovascular diseases: research through 2017 ===
The Mediterranean diet is included among dietary patterns that may reduce the risk of cardiovascular diseases. A 2013 Cochrane review found limited evidence that a Mediterranean diet favorably affects cardiovascular risk factors. A 2013 meta-analysis compared Mediterranean, vegan, vegetarian, low-glycemic index, low-carbohydrate, high-fiber, and high-protein diets with control diets. The research concluded that Mediterranean, low-carbohydrate, low-glycemic index, and high-protein diets are effective in improving markers of risk for cardiovascular disease and diabetes, while there was limited evidence for an effect of vegetarian diets on glycemic control and lipid levels unrelated to weight loss. A Mediterranean diet was recommended in 2016 as a means of lowering apolipoprotein B.

In 2016, the American Heart Association discussed the Mediterranean diet as a healthy dietary pattern that may reduce the risk of cardiovascular diseases.

However, more cautious reviews arose in 2016, raising concerns about the quality of previous systematic reviews examining the impact of a Mediterranean diet on cardiovascular risk factors. These reviews encouraged the need for further standardized research, with one review and meta-analysis concluding that the quantity and quality of the available evidence were highly variable, cautioning that limitations exist about the certainty of possible clinical outcomes from consuming a Mediterranean diet. Other reviews in 2016-17 reached further conclusions about the ability of a Mediterranean diet to improve cardiovascular risk factors, such as lowering the risk for hypertension and other cardiovascular diseases.

=== Cardiovascular diseases: research since 2019 ===
A 2019 Cochrane review found that uncertainty exists about the effects of a Mediterranean‐style diet on cardiovascular disease occurrence and risk factors in people both with or without extant cardiovascular disease. The review further discussed that research on the diet provided evidence for only modest benefits against cardiovascular disease risk factors, with the research having low to moderate quality.

A 2023 review provided evidence for a reduction of mortality and cardiovascular disease risk in women on a Mediterranean-type diet. A 2024 meta-analysis found that adherence to consuming these foods was associated with reduction in cardiovascular disease risk.

=== Diabetes ===
In 2014, two meta-analyses found that the Mediterranean diet was associated with a decreased risk of type 2 diabetes, findings similar to those of a 2017 review. The American Diabetes Association and a 2019 review indicated that the Mediterranean diet is a healthy dietary pattern that may reduce the risk of diabetes.

=== Cancer ===
A meta-analysis in 2008 found that strictly following the Mediterranean diet was correlated with a decreased risk of dying from cancer by 6%. Another 2014 review found that adherence to the Mediterranean diet was associated with a decreased risk of death from cancer. A 2017 review found a decreased rate of cancer, although evidence was weak. An updated review in 2021 found that the Mediterranean diet is associated with a 13% lower risk of cancer mortality in the general population.

=== Weight loss in obesity ===
Overweight adults who adopt Mediterranean diets may lose weight by consuming fewer calories. A 2019 review found that the Mediterranean diet may help obese people lower the quantity and improve the nutritional quality of food intake, with an overall effect of possibly losing body weight.

=== Cognitive ability ===
A 2016 systematic review found a relation between greater adherence to a Mediterranean diet and better cognitive performance; it is unclear if the relationship is causal.

According to a 2013 systematic review, greater adherence to a Mediterranean diet is correlated with a lower risk of Alzheimer's disease and slower cognitive decline. Another 2013 systematic review reached similar conclusions, and also found a negative association with the risk of progressing from mild cognitive impairment to Alzheimer's, but acknowledged that only a small number of studies had been done on the topic.

=== Mental health ===
Several avenues of research have investigated the specific impact of a Mediterranean diet on psychological well-being. A Mediterranean diet has been shown to improve neurological disorders. Vitamin D supplementation and fish oil supplementation are also thought to reduce levels of inflammation. Findings suggest that adding vitamin D and fish oil supplements to an existing treatment for depression could have benefits.Ultra-processed foods are also associated with depression.

Recent evidence suggests that the Mediterranean diet, which prioritizes whole foods such as fruit, vegetables, whole grains, healthy fats, and fish, with moderations on dairy, poultry, red meat, and processed foods, directly relates to reduced depression and anxiety. The Supporting the Modification of Lifestyle in Lowered Emotional States trial, the first reported study on the relationship between the Mediterranean diet and lifestyle, concluded significant improvement in major depressive episodes.Additional research in adolescents (10-19yo) suggests that dietary patterns should be adjusted to align more closely with the Mediterranean diet in comparison with Western practices as the reduction of sweetened beverages and processed foods may be more effective in reducing symptoms of depression.

Studies have shown that "prebiotic, probiotic, or synbiotic treatment" based in the Mediterranean diet can reduce depressive symptoms. These treatments can increase the diversity of bacteria in the gut and enhance their survival.

A Mediterranean-style diet, along with increased intake of fruits and vegetables, omega-3 fatty acids, balanced dietary patterns, comprehensive micronutrient supplementation, and nutrients such as zinc, magnesium, and selenium, as well as probiotics and various phytochemicals has been associated with improvements in anxiety disorders. Dietary factors associated with the Western diet including foods with high saturated fats and sugar as well as the consumption of high amounts of ultra-processed foods have been associated with increased anxiety. Data pulled from a pre-clinical trial surrounding the impacts of diet on social isolation within socially housed crab eating monkeys (Macaca fascicularis) suggests a direct positive relationship between the Mediterranean diet and affiliation. The trial also concluded a significant decrease in sociableness among the monkeys that were fed with the Western style diet. In humans, social isolation has been linked to increased inflammation and is considered a risk factor for psychiatric conditions. Given the biological and behavioral similarities between humans and primates, the greater levels of isolation observed in monkeys fed a Western diet compared to those fed a Mediterranean diet further supports an association between Western dietary patterns and psychiatric disorders such as anxiety.

A Mediterranean diet has been shown to be beneficial in bipolar disorder and in schizophrenia.

==== Major depressive disorder ====
Observational studies have found a correlation between adherence to the Mediterranean diet and a lower risk of depression but have not proven that a Mediterranean diet lowers the risk of depression.

=== Gluten ===
As the Mediterranean diet usually includes products containing gluten, such as pasta and bread, increasing use of the diet may have contributed to the growing rate of gluten-related disorders.

== Dietary components ==
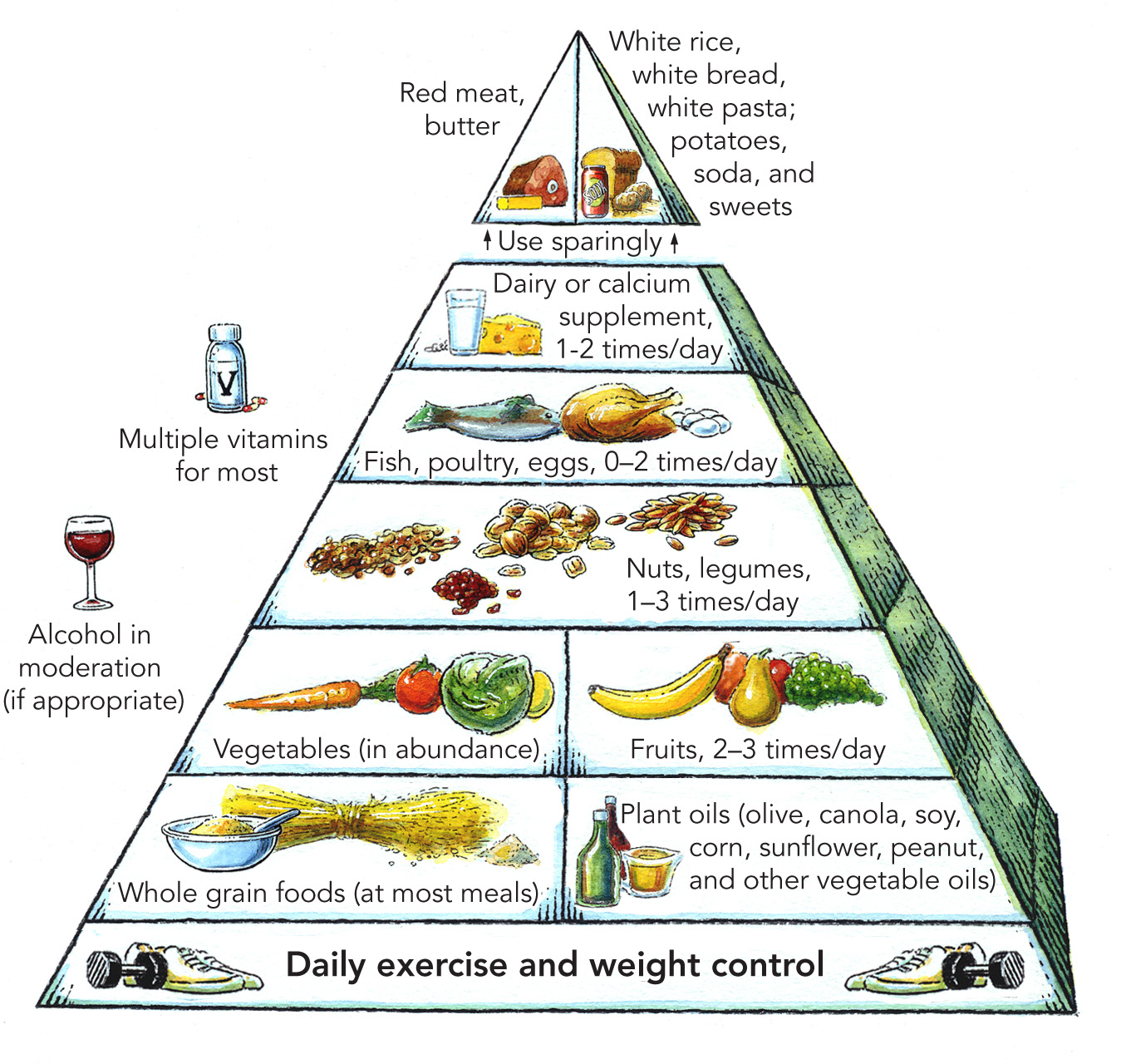
The Mediterranean diet food pyramid, summarizing the pattern of eating associated with this diet

There are variations of the "Mediterranean diets" in different countries and among the individual populations of the Mediterranean basin, due to ethnic, cultural, economic and religious diversities. The "Mediterranean diet" as defined by dietitians generally includes the following components, which are not typical of diets in the Mediterranean Basin:

- High intakes of olive oil (as the principal source of fat), and a plant-based diet: vegetables (including leafy green vegetables, onions, garlic, tomatoes, and peppers), fresh fruits (consumed as desserts or snacks), cereals (mostly whole grains), nuts, and legumes.
- Moderate intakes of fish and other seafood, poultry, eggs, dairy products (primarily cheese and yogurt), and red wine.
- Low intakes of red meat, processed meat, refined carbohydrates, and sweets.

These proportions are sometimes represented in the Mediterranean Diet Pyramid. In a diet with roughly this composition, the fat content accounts for 25% to 35% of the total intake of calories, while the amount of saturated fat is, at most, 8% of the calorie content.

Some cuisines of the Mediterranean region are not fully consistent with Mediterranean diet guidelines. For instance, olive oil is not the staple fat in the cuisines of all countries which border the Mediterranean: in northern and central Italy, lard and butter are commonly used in cooking, and olive oil is reserved for dressing salads and cooked vegetables; in both North Africa and the Middle East, sheep's tail fat and rendered butter (samna) are traditional staple fats.

Comparison of dietary recommendations for three Mediterranean diet plans
Foods	Mediterranean Diet Foundation (2011)	Oldways Preservation and Trust (2009)	Greek Dietary Guidelines (1999)
Olive oil	Every meal	Every meal	Main added lipid
Vegetables	≥2 servings every meal	Every meal	6 serv./day
Fruits	1–2 serv. every meal	Every meal	3 serv./day
Bread/cereals	1–2 serv. every meal	Every meal	8 serv./day
Legumes	≥2 serv./week	Every meal	3-4 serv./week
Nuts	1–2 serv./day	Every meal	3–4 serv./week
Fish/seafood	≥2 serv./week	≥2 serv./week	5–6 serv./week
Eggs	2–4 serv./week	Moderate portions, daily to weekly	3 serv./week
Poultry	2 serv./week	Moderate portions, daily to weekly	4 serv./week
Dairy products	2 serv./day	Moderate portions, daily to weekly	2 serv./day
Red meat	<2 serv./week	Less often	4 serv./month
Sweets	<2 serv./week	Less often	3 serv./week
Red wine	In moderation	In moderation	Daily, in moderation
Servings are defined as: bread 25 g., potato 100 g., cooked pasta 50–60 g., vegetables 100 g., apple 80 g., banana 60 g., orange 100 g., melon 200 g., grapes 30 g., milk or yogurt 1 cup, 1 egg, meat 60 g., cooked dry beans 100 g.

== Environmental effects ==
Consuming a Mediterranean diet or plant-based diet may contribute to improving environmental and agricultural sustainability, possibly due to lower use of dairy products, ruminant meat, and ultra-processed foods. The environmental impact and amount of energy needed to feed livestock exceeds its nutritional value. In a 2014 lifecycle analysis of greenhouse gas emissions, researchers found that a Mediterranean-like diet may reduce food production emissions below those of an omnivorous diet for 2050, with a per capita reduction of 30%.

== History and research ==
Elements of the Mediterranean diet have been traced to several ancient cultures in the region, particularly the Greeks and Romans, using olive oil, seafood, bread, and wine. The Mediterranean diet as a concept was first publicized in 1975 by American biologist Ancel Keys and chemist Margaret Keys, a husband-and-wife team. The Keys were the first to draw a correlation between cardiovascular disease and diet, based on studies in the 1950s in southern Italy.

Objective data showing possible benefits of the Mediterranean diet originated from epidemiological studies in southern Italy and Crete; these were confirmed later by the Seven Countries Study directed by Keys and published in 1970, which was followed by a book-length report in 1980. A 25-year follow up study published in 1996 determined that populations that had adopted a "Mediterranean diet"—defined as incorporating olive oil, bread, pasta, vegetables, herbs and seafood, with moderate consumption of meat—presented low levels of blood cholesterol and reduced incidence of coronary heart disease.

The Mediterranean diet was further studied in the 1990s by Walter Willett and colleagues of the Harvard University School of Public Health. The Mediterranean diet is based on a paradox: although people living in Mediterranean countries tend to consume relatively high amounts of fat, they generally have lower incidence of cardiovascular disease than those living in countries with similar levels of fat consumption, such as the United States; a parallel phenomenon is known as the French paradox.

Since about 2016, the American Heart Association and American Diabetes Association have recommended the Mediterranean diet as a dietary pattern that may reduce the risk of cardiovascular diseases and type 2 diabetes. The National Health Service also recommends a Mediterranean diet to reduce cardiovascular disease risk.

In 2018, clinical research showed favorable outcomes for using the Mediterranean diet to lower the risk of metabolic syndrome.

Researchers frequently use questionnaires such as the MEDAS questionnaire (Mediterranean diet adherence screener) to monitor how closely someone is adhering to a Mediterranean-style diet, and can also be used by individuals monitoring their own diet.

== See also ==
Media related to Mediterranean diet at Wikimedia Commons

- Cretan cuisine
- Health effects of wine
- Ikaria Study
- List of diets
- Mediterranean cuisine
- Mediterranean Diet Foundation
- Sustainable diet
