= Nutrition and cognition =

Biological relationship

Relatively speaking, the brain consumes an immense amount of energy in comparison to the rest of the body. The mechanisms involved in the transfer of energy from foods to neurons are likely to be fundamental to the control of brain function. Human bodily processes, including the brain, all require both macronutrients, as well as micronutrients.

Insufficient intake of selected vitamins, or certain metabolic disorders, may affect cognitive processes by disrupting the nutrient-dependent processes within the body that are associated with the management of energy in neurons, which can subsequently affect synaptic plasticity, or the ability to encode new memories.

== Macronutrients ==
The human brain requires nutrients obtained from the diet to develop and sustain its physical structure and cognitive functions. Additionally, the brain requires caloric energy predominately derived from the primary macronutrients to operate. The three primary macronutrients include carbohydrates, proteins, and fats. Each macronutrient can impact cognition through multiple mechanisms, including glucose and insulin metabolism, neurotransmitter actions, oxidative stress and inflammation, and the gut-brain axis. Inadequate macronutrient consumption or proportion could impair optimal cognitive functioning and have long-term health implications.

=== Carbohydrates ===
Through digestion, dietary carbohydrates are broken down and converted into glucose, which is the sole energy source for the brain. Optimal brain function relies on adequate carbohydrate consumption, as carbohydrates provide the quickest source of glucose for the brain. Glucose deficiencies such as hypoglycaemia reduce available energy for the brain and impair all cognitive processes and performance. Additionally, situations with high cognitive demand, such as learning a new task, increase brain glucose utilization, depleting blood glucose stores and initiating the need for supplementation.

Complex carbohydrates, especially those with high dietary fibre, are associated with increased cognitive performance and improved memory function. This is because fibre regulates glucose metabolism, slowing the release of insulin and preserving insulin sensitivity. An improperly functioning glucose and insulin metabolism is a primary mechanism for cognitive impairment, and general metabolic dysfunction, as it can cause inflammation and oxidative stress within the brain, potentially leading to neurodegeneration. Therefore, complex carbohydrates with high fibre can improve glucose and insulin metabolism, which decreases inflammation and oxidative stress, and leads to improved brain aging as measured by the absence of disability, depression, chronic disease, and decreased cognitive decline.

Simple carbohydrates are associated with decreased global cognitive performance. Simple carbohydrates negatively impact many essential cognitive processes, including attention, memory, reaction time, visual-spatial processing, mental processing speed, and executive functions. Simple carbohydrates impair cognition through glucose and insulin metabolism dysfunction, as well as causing inflammation and oxidative stress within the brain. Therefore, excessive or chronic consumption of simple carbohydrates is unanimously linked to negative health consequences.

=== Proteins ===
Through digestion dietary proteins are broken down into individual amino acids and absorbed into the blood. The essential amino acids tyrosine and tryptophan are precursors for the neurotransmitters dopamine, serotonin, and norepinephrine, and these chemicals modulate neural activity and influence cognitive functioning.

Dietary protein can improve cognition by increasing reaction time and inhibition control during mentally demanding and physically stressful situations, as tyrosine and tryptophan will replenish exhausted neurotransmitter levels. Additionally, adequate and consistent consumption of tyrosine and tryptophan correlates to improvements in memory function. Tyrosine is also shown to improve convergent thinking processes through increased cognitive control.

=== Fats ===
Through digestion dietary fats are broken down into individual fatty acids for utilization. Fatty acids are classified as saturated, trans, monounsaturated, polyunsaturated, and cholesterol. Each class has distinct affects on cognitive functioning and health. Omega-3 polyunsaturated fatty acids are especially significant as they are critical cell membrane and structural components of the brain.

Cholesterol is an unsaturated alcohol commonly found in eggs, meat, and dairy. Studies on dietary cholesterol have indicated both positive and negative effects on global cognitive functioning. However, the adverse cognitive effects of cholesterol consumption appear to be reduced when combined with physical activity, which influences energy homeostasis and synaptic plasticity.

Saturated fatty acids are typically solid at room temperature with common sources including butter, cheese, and meat. Trans fatty acids occur naturally in some meat and dairy products, however the majority are artificially created by hydrogenating vegetable oils and are present in many processed foods. Saturated and trans fatty acids decrease cognitive functioning and specifically impact memory and learning performance.

== Micronutrients ==
=== Choline ===
Choline is an essential nutrient and its primary function within the human body is the synthesis of cellular membranes, although it serves other functions as well. It is a precursor molecule to the neurotransmitter Acetylcholine which serves a wide range of functions including motor control and memory. Choline deficiencies may be related to some liver and neurological disorders. Because of its role in cellular synthesis, choline is an important nutrient during the prenatal and early postnatal development of offspring as it contributes to brain development. Choline intakes from food for men, women and children may be below the Adequate Intake levels. Women, especially when pregnant or lactating, the elderly, and infants, are at risk for choline deficiency. Beef liver, wheat germ, and egg yolks are common foods providing choline.

=== B vitamins ===
B vitamins, also known as the B-complex, are an interrelated group of nutrients which often co-occur in food. The complex consists of: thiamine (B_{1}), riboflavin (B_{2}), niacin (B_{3}), pantothenic acid (B_{5}), pyridoxin (B_{6}), folic acid (B_{9}), cobalamin (B_{12}), and biotin. B vitamins are not synthesized in the body, and thus need to be obtained from food. B-complex vitamins are water-soluble vitamins, which means that they are not stored within the body. In consequence, the B vitamins need ongoing replenishment. It is possible to identify broad cognitive effects of certain B vitamins, as they are involved in many significant metabolic processes within the brain.

=== Vitamin B_{1} (thiamine) ===
This vitamin is important for the facilitation of glucose use, thus ensuring the production of energy for the brain, and normal functioning of the nervous system, muscles and heart. Thiamine is found throughout mammalian nervous tissue, including the brain and spinal cord. Metabolism and coenzyme function of the vitamin suggest a distinctive function for thiamine within the nervous system.

=== Vitamin B_{3} (niacin) ===
Vitamin B_{3}, also known as niacin, includes both nicotinamide as well as nicotinic acid, both of which function in many biological oxidization and reduction reactions within the body. Niacin is involved in the synthesis of fatty acids and cholesterol, known mediators of brain biochemistry, and in effect, of cognitive function.

=== Vitamin B_{9} (folic acid) ===
Folate and vitamin B_{12} play a vital role in the synthesis of S-adenosylmethionine, which is of key importance in the maintenance and repair of all cells, including neurons. In addition, folate has been linked to the maintenance of adequate brain levels of cofactors necessary for chemicals reactions that lead to the synthesis of serotonin and catecholamine neurotransmitters. Concentrations of blood plasma folate and homocysteine concentrations are inversely related, such that an increase in dietary folate decreases homocysteine concentration. Thus, dietary intake of folate is a major determinant of homocysteine levels within the body.

The link between levels of folate and altered mental function is not large, but is sufficient to suggest a causal association. Deficiency in folate can cause an elevation of homocysteine within the blood, as the clearance of homocysteine requires enzymatic action dependent on folate, and to a lesser extent, vitamins B_{6} and B_{12}. Elevated homocysteine has been associated with increased risk of vascular events, as well as dementia.

Intake of the vitamin has been linked to deficits in learning and memory, particularly within the elderly population. Elderly people deficient in folate may present with deficits in free recall and recognition, which suggests that levels of folate may be related to efficacy of episodic memory. Because neurulation may be completed before pregnancy is recognized, it is recommended that women capable of becoming pregnant take about 400 μg of folic acid from fortified foods, supplements, or a combination of the two in order to reduce the risk of neural tube defects. These major anomalies in the nervous system can be reduced by 85% with systematic folate supplementation occurring before the onset of pregnancy. The incidence of Alzheimer's and other cognitive diseases has been loosely connected to deficiencies in folate. It is recommended for the elderly to consume folate through food, fortified or not, and supplements in order to reduce risk of developing the disease.

=== Vitamin B_{12} ===
Also known as cobalamin, B_{12} is important for the maintenance of neurological function. B_{12} deficiency, also known as hypocobalaminemia, often results from complications involving absorption into the body. An assortment of neurological effects can be observed in 75–90% of individuals of any age with clinically observable B_{12} deficiency. Cobalamin deficiency manifestations are apparent in the abnormalities of the spinal cord, peripheral nerves, optic nerves, and cerebrum.

People who are deficient in B_{12} despite normal absorption functionality may be treated through oral administration of at least 6 μg/day of the vitamin in pill form. People who suffer from irreversible causes of deficiency, such as pernicious anemia or old age, will need lifelong treatment with pharmacological doses of B_{12}. Strategy for treatment is dependent on the person's level of deficiency as well as their level of cognitive functioning. Treatment for those with severe deficiency involves 1000 μg of B_{12} administered intramuscularly daily for one week, weekly for one month, then monthly for the rest of the person's life. The progression of neurological manifestations of cobalamin deficiency is generally gradual. As a result, early diagnosis is important or else irreversible damage may occur. People who become demented usually show little to no cognitive improvement with the administration of B_{12}. There is risk that folic acid administered to those with B_{12} deficiency may mask anemic symptoms without solving the issue at hand. In this case, people would still be at risk for neurological deficits associated with B_{12} deficiency-related anemia, which are not associated with anemia related to folate deficiency.

=== Vitamin A deficiency ===
Vitamin A is an essential nutrient for mammals which takes form in either retinol or the provitamin beta-Carotene. It helps regulation of cell division, cell function, genetic regulation, helps enhance the immune system, and is required for brain function, chemical balance, growth and development of the central nervous system and vision.

=== Iron deficiency ===
Oxygen transportation, DNA synthesis, myelin synthesis, oxidative phosphorylation, and neurotransmitter synthesis and metabolism are all biological processes that require iron; however, an iron imbalance can result in neurotoxicity causing oxidation and modification of lipids, proteins, carbohydrates, and DNA. Hypoxic conditions in severely anemic individuals may cause brain damage resulting in cognitive impairment. When iron levels in the brain are disrupted neurophysiological mechanisms and cognition are affected, potentially resulting in long-term behavioral changes and may affect attention span, intelligence, sensory perception functions, mood, and behavior. Neuropathies such as ADHD, autism, depression, anxiety, schizophrenia, and bipolar disorder are seen in iron deficient individuals. However, excessive iron accumulation can be seen in neurodegenerative diseases including Alzheimer's and Huntington's disease. Iron is needed to develop the central nervous system (CNS), endocrine system, autoimmune system, and brain. Iron is involved with the development and functioning of different neurotransmitter systems and large iron quantities are required for the myelination of white brain matter. Abnormal myelination of white matter due to iron deficiency during development may be related to the onset of psychological disorders in adolescents. Decreased iron concentration results in a reduction of neurotransmitter levels, in turn leading to poor myelination and delayed neuromaturation.

== See also ==
- Nootropic
- Nutrition
- Nutritional neuroscience
- Pellagra
- Wernicke–Korsakoff syndrome
