= Consumers, Health, Agriculture and Food Executive Agency =

Executive agency of the European Union

- Chafea

Executive Agency overview
- Headquarters: 12, Rue Guillaume Kroll, Gasperich, Luxembourg City, L-1882; Luxembourg; 49.5790748°N 6.1112315°E
- Executive Agency executive: Véronique Wasbauer, Director
- Key document: Commission Implementing Decision 2014/927/EU
- Website: ec.europa.eu/chafea//

The Consumers, Health, Agriculture and Food Executive Agency (Chafea) was an executive agency of the European Union, set up by the European Commission to manage four programmes on its behalf, in the domains of health, consumer protection, food safety, and the promotion of European agricultural products. From April 2021 on, these programmes were reassigned to other agencies, most notably the newly created Health and Digital Executive Agency (HaDEA).

== History ==
The executive agency was originally founded under the Barroso I Commission in 2005, as the ‘Public Health Executive Agency’, with a mandate extending to 31 December 2010. It was entrusted to manage the Commission's 2003-2008 public health programme. In 2008, the Commission delegated its public health programme for the duration of 2008–2013 to the agency, and additionally widened its mandate to cover the oversight of the Commission's consumer policy programme. It was renamed the ‘Executive Agency for Health and Consumers’ to reflect this change, and its mandate extended to 31 December 2015.

In January 2014, the ‘Consumers, Health and Food Executive Agency’ legally succeeded the Executive Agency for Health and Consumers, reflecting the decision of the Commission to delegate its food safety training programme to the agency following a cost benefit analysis. The Commission also delegated to the agency its consumer and health programmes for the 2014-2020 period, and extended the mandate of the agency to 31 December 2024 accordingly. In December 2014, the Juncker Commission, delegated to the agency its programme of information provision on the promotion of agricultural products for the EU's internal market and foreign consumption. Reflecting this, it became the ‘Consumers, Health, Agriculture and Food Executive Agency’ in December 2014.

Per Commission Implementing Decision (EU) 2021/173 of 12 February 2021, Chafea was disintegrated, and its tasks reassigned to six newly established executive agencies:

- the European Climate, Infrastructure and Environment Executive Agency;
- the European Research Executive Agency;
- the European Innovation Council and SMEs Executive Agency;
- the European Education and Culture Executive Agency;
- the European Research Council Executive Agency;
- the European Health and Digital Executive Agency.

== See also ==
- Directorate-General for Health and Food Safety
