= Biosecurity in the United States =

Biosecurity in the United States is governed by the Bureau of Western Hemisphere Affairs, which is part of the US Department of State. It obtains guidance and advice on specific matters relating to biosecurity from various other government agencies.

Biosecurity is set of measures aimed at preventing the introduction and/or spread of harmful organisms, in order to minimise the risk of transmission of infectious diseases to people, animals and plants caused by viruses, bacteria or other microorganisms. As well as protecting the agricultural economy and other industries of countries, it protects human health against biorisks caused by natural occurrences, accident, or deliberate acts of bioterrorism. The term also extends to dealing with epidemic and pandemic diseases, with the World Health Organization (WHO) playing an important role in the management of the latter. WHO has described biosecurity as a strategic and integrated approach to analysing and managing relevant risks to human, animal and plant life and health and associated risks for the environment.

Biosecurity protocols are also used in laboratories and research facilities to prevent dangerous biological materials from falling into the hands of malevolent parties, particularly where dual-use research is being undertaken, for both peaceful and military applications.

== Terminology ==
The term "biosecurity" has multiple meanings and is defined differently according to various disciplines. The term was first used by the agricultural and environmental communities. Starting from the late 1990s in response to the threat of biological terrorism, biosecurity encompasses the prevention of the theft of biological materials from research laboratories. These preventative measures are a combination of systems and practices put into its place at bioscience laboratories to prevent the use of dangerous pathogens and toxins for malicious use, as well as by customs agents and agricultural and natural resource managers to prevent the spread of these biological agents.

WHO has described biosecurity as a strategic and integrated approach to analysing and managing relevant risks to human, animal and plant life and health and associated risks for the environment.

The term has in the past been used purely to describe preventive and quarantine measures put in place to minimise the risk of invasive pests or diseases arriving at a specific location that could damage crops and livestock as well as the wider environment. However, the term has evolved to encompass much more. It includes managing biological threats to people, industries or environment. These may be from foreign or endemic organisms, but they can also extend to pandemic diseases and the threat of bioterrorism.

=== US definitions ===
In 2001, the US National Association of State Departments of Agriculture (NASDA) defined biosecurity as "the sum of risk management practices in defense against biological threats", and its main goal as "protect[ing] against the risk posed by disease and organisms".

The USDA Animal and Plant Health Inspection Service (APHIS) defines biosecurity as "everything that’s done to keep diseases and the pathogens that carry them – viruses, bacteria, funguses, parasites and other microorganisms – away from birds, property, and people".

The National Academy of Sciences defines biosecurity as "security against the inadvertent, inappropriate, or intentional malicious or malevolent use of potentially dangerous biological agents or biotechnology, including the development, production, stockpiling, or use of biological weapons as well as outbreaks of newly emergent and epidemic disease". It is thus one aspect of health security.

== Governance and legislation ==
In the US, biosecurity is governed by the Bureau of Western Hemisphere Affairs, which is within the Department of State. The Bureau promotes global health security as part of its role in the biodefense network, "because infectious disease threats, whether naturally occurring, deliberate, or accidental, have the potential to spread globally and affect American people and interests". The Department of State works with other US government agencies such as the Department of Defense, Department of Health and Human Services (HHS), Centers for Disease Control (CDC), and National Institutes of Health (NIH), and also international organizations like the Pan American Health Organization and partner countries in order to protect US citizens.

The National Science Advisory Board for Biosecurity is a panel of experts that reports to the Secretary of the United States Department of Health and Human Services. It is tasked with recommending policies on such questions as how to prevent published research in biotechnology from aiding terrorism, without slowing scientific progress. It provides "advice, guidance, and leadership regarding biosecurity oversight of dual-use research to all Federal departments and agencies with an interest in life sciences research".

The Federal Select Agent Program (FSAP) regulates the use of biological select agents and toxins that could pose a severe threat directly to human, animal or plant health, or to animal or plant products that may be consumed. FSAP is jointly managed by the Division of Select Agents and Toxins (DSAT) at the CDC, which is part of the HHS, and the Agriculture Select Agent Services (AgSAS) at APHIS, which is part of the US Department of Agriculture (USDA). DSAT is concerned with human health, while AgSAS is concerned with animals and plants.

=== Securing our Agriculture and Food Act 2017 ===
A bipartisan bill described as an "agro-terrorism bill" was signed by the President and passed in both houses 2017, the result of concerns raised after the 2015 outbreak of avian influenza that had a devastating effect on poultry in Iowa. The response to that emergency had revealed cracks in the federal government’s ability to react quickly to this type of large-scale animal disease outbreak, and raised concerns about the nation's ability to respond to agro-terrorism. The new legislation, called Securing our Agriculture and Food Act (H.R. 1238), amended the Homeland Security Act of 2002 and requires the Secretary of Homeland Security, through the Assistant Secretary of Homeland Security for Health Affairs, to lead the federal government’s efforts to ensure the security of food, agriculture and veterinary systems against terrorism and other high-risk events, thus making this person responsible for coordinating the efforts of the Department of Homeland Security.

== Agriculture and aquaculture ==
Naturally occurring pathogens are a constant battle for the U.S. agriculture and aquaculture industries.

=== Aquaculture ===
Biosecurity measures in aquaculture may include:

- Isolation — Minimizing human-fish contact, and keeping fish safe from predators.
- Disinfection — Avoiding cross-contamination through disinfection and cleaning protocols.
- Monitoring — Collecting culture samples for routine surveillance.
- Destruction — Eradicating harmful organisms.

== Medical countermeasures ==
Medical countermeasures (MCMs) are products such as biologics and pharmaceutical drugs that can protect from or treat the effects of a chemical, biological, radiological, or nuclear (CBRN) attack, or in the case of public health emergencies. MCMs can also be used for prevention and diagnosis of symptoms associated with CBRN attacks or threats.

The FDA runs a program called the "FDA Medical Countermeasures Initiative" (MCMi). It helps support "partner" agencies and organizations prepare for public health emergencies that could require MCMs. Its partners include government agencies at all levels of government, NGOs, universities, research centers, and FDA medical product centers. The federal government provides funding for MCM-related programs. In June 2016, a Senate Appropriations subcommittee approved a bill that would continue funding four specific medical countermeasure programs:

- $512 million for the Biomedical Advanced Research and Development Authority (BARDA)
- $510 million for BioShield Special Reserve Fund (SRF)
- $575 million for the Strategic National Stockpile (SNS)
- $72 million for pandemic influenza

== Challenges ==
The destruction of the World Trade Center in Manhattan on September 11, 2001 by terrorists and a subsequent wave of anthrax attacks on US media and government outlets (both real and hoax) led to increased attention on the risk of bioterrorism attacks in the United States. This led to increased funding to prepare for and respond to threats of bioterrorism. The US spent about $60 billion between October 2001 and September 2011.

In the October 2011 Bio-Response Report Card, the Center for the Study of Weapons of Mass Destruction (established in 1994 as the Center for Counterproliferation Research, as an outgrowth of the Defense Counterproliferation Initiative) stated that the major challenges to biosecurity were:

- attribution
- communication
- detection and diagnosis
- environmental cleanup
- medical countermeasure availability
- medical countermeasure development and approval process
- medical countermeasure dispensing
- medical management

== See also ==
- Biorisk
- Biosafety
- Bioterrorism
- Global Health Security Initiative
- Good Agricultural Practices
- International Health Regulations
- Invasive species
- Public health
- Quarantine
- World Health Organization
