= European BioSafety Association =

Non-profit Organization

- Founded: 1996

The European BioSafety Association is a non-profit organization, founded in June 1996, which provides a forum to its members to discuss and debate issues of concern and to represent those working in the field of biosafety and associated activities The association based in Gentbrugge (Belgium) and founded in June 1996, has more than 400 members and its reach is not only the twenty-seven members of the European Union, but the entire continent. Its members are professionals from universities and research centers, or represent governments or private organizations.

Its objectives include: Establishing and communicating best biosafety and biocontainment practices among its members and encouraging dialogue and discussions on development issues; represent and defend the collective interests of its members in all areas related to biosafety and biocontainment, and influence and support emerging legislation and standards, with the aim of guaranteeing the prevention of harm to people or the environment from biological substances or materials.

The European BioSafety Association collaborates with other international organizations such as the International Federation of Biosafety Associations, European Committee for Standardization or the International Organization for Standardization to manage the risks associated with the use and handling of biological substances that could cause accidents or affect health and to establish standards to prevent the intentional use of these substances. The European BioSafety Association and the American Biological Safety Association have played a leading role in implementing safety standards in laboratories that work with biological materials.

Within the framework of the European Union, the European BioSafety Association provides advice on the preparation of documents related to biosafety.

== See also ==
- European Centre for Disease Prevention and Control
- Biosecurity Australia
- Public health
