= American Biological Safety Association =

The American Biological Safety Association (ABSA) was founded in 1984 to promote biological safety as an essential principle and serve the needs of biosafety professionals. The association's goals are to represent the interests and desires of practitioners of biosafety, and to be a dispenser of biosafety information.

The concept of biological safety (or biosafety) has paralleled the development of the science of microbiology and its extension into new and related areas including tissue culture, recombinant DNA, animal studies, molecular biology, synthetic biology, and biotechnology. The knowledge and skill gained by microbiologists necessary to isolate, manipulate, and propagate pathogenic microorganisms required parallel development of containment principles, facility design, and practices and procedures to prevent occupational infections in the workplace or release of the organisms to the environment.

== History ==
In 2007, the American Biological Safety Association entered into an agreement with the National Agricultural Library for the library to process, preserve, and provide access to the collection which documents the history of the association. Rachel Telford, Special Collections Intern from the University of Maryland, completed the processing at the National Agricultural Library in 2008. The following history is taken from that collection.

The American Biological Safety Association (ABSA) was founded in 1984 to promote biosafety as a scientific discipline and to serve the growing needs of biosafety professionals throughout the world. Biosafety concerns the safe handling of biological materials, particularly infectious agents that cause risk to humans working with them.

Although ABSA was officially founded in 1984, almost 30 years earlier, on April 18, 1955, 14 representatives from Camp Detrick, Maryland; Pine Bluff Arsenal, Arkansas; and Dugway Proving Grounds, Utah met at Camp Detrick in Frederick, Maryland. The purpose of the meeting was to share knowledge and experiences regarding chemical, biological, radiological, and industrial safety issues that were common to the operations at the three principal biological warfare laboratories of the United States Army: the Biological Research Laboratories at Camp Detrick, the Biological Production and Development Laboratories at Pine Bluff Arsenal, and the Biological Assessment Laboratories at Dugway Proving Grounds. This meeting was the first biological safety conference. Due to the nature of the work conducted at the biological warfare laboratories, papers presented at the conference had to be cleared in advance by security officers and attendance was restricted to persons with top secret security clearances.

Beginning in 1957, the biological safety conferences were planned to include non-classified sessions to enable broader sharing of biological safety information with personnel not associated with the United States Army biological warfare programs. But it was not until 1964 that the conference was held at a government installation not associated with the biological warfare program; the National Animal Disease Laboratory, in Ames, Iowa. Over the first 10 years, the biological safety conferences grew to include representatives from all federal agencies that sponsored and/or conducted research with pathogenic microorganisms, and by 1966 included representatives from universities, private laboratories, hospitals, industrial complexes, and 17 government installations.

Throughout the 1970s, participation in the conferences continued to grow, and by 1983, discussions began regarding the creation of a formal organization. The American Biological Safety Association was officially established and a constitution and bylaws were written in 1984; however, the constitution was not ratified by members until 1987.

As of 2008, ABSA membership includes over 1,600 professionals from across the nation, and over 20 countries, including Brazil, Canada, and Japan. Its goals are to provide a professional association that represents the interests and needs of practitioners of biological safety, and to provide a forum for the continued and timely exchange of biosafety information. In addition to conducting annual biological safety conferences to keep members informed of current biosafety issues and regulatory initiatives, and offering registration and certification, ABSA publishes and distributes a quarterly journal, Applied Biosafety, and conducts a selection of biosafety courses geared at the beginner and advanced levels. In addition, ABSA produces an annual membership directory to stimulate networking. ABSA is committed to its members in four broad areas: developing and maintaining professional standards for the field of biological safety; advancing biological safety as a scientific discipline through education and research; providing members sustained opportunities for biosafety communication, education, and participation in the development of biological safety standards, guidelines and regulations; and expanding biosafety awareness and promoting the development of work practices, equipment, and facilities to reduce the potential for occupational illness and adverse environmental impact from infectious agents or biologically derived materials.

== Publications ==
- The association's journal is Applied Biosafety: Journal of the American Biological Safety Association (JABSA), published by Mary Ann Liebert publishers.

== Past presidents ==
Year	President
1985	Everett Hanel
1986	Jerry Tulis, PhD
1987	Jonathan Richmond, PhD, RBP
1988	John H. Richardson, PhD, RBP
1989	Joseph Songer
1990	Diane Fleming, PhD, RBP, CBSP
1991	Emmett Barkley, PhD
1992	Gerald Spahn, PhD, CBSP
1993	Jerome Schmidt, PhD, CBSP
1994	Mary Cipriano, RBP, CBSP
1995	Manny Barbeito, CBSP
1996	Byron Tepper, PhD, CBSP
1997	Joseph Van Houten, PhD, RBP, CBSP
1998	Richard Knudsen
1999	Marilyn Misenhimer
2000	Jack Keene, DrPH, RBP, CBSP
2001	Debra Hunt, DrPH, RBP, CBSP
2002	Maureen (Best) Ellis, RBP
2003	Barbara Johnson, PhD, RBP
2004	Stefan Wagener, PhD, RBP, CBSP
2005	Betsy Gilman-Duane, RBP, CBSP
2006	Glenn Funk, PhD, CBSP
2007	Bob Hawley, PhD, RBP, CBSP
2008	Chris Thompson, RBP, CBSP
2009	Bob Ellis, PhD, CBSP
2010	Ben Fontes, MPH
2011	Karen Byers, MS, RBP, CBSP
2012	LouAnn C. Burnett, MS, CBSP
2013	Barbara Fox Nellis, SM(NRCM), RBP, CBSP

== See also ==
- Biological safety, biosafety, biosecurity
- Biotechnology
- Biological warfare
- Biocontainment, Biological containment, Biological Containment
- Biosafety cabinet, Biosafety suites
- Biosafety level links ABSA
- Bacillus atrophaeus links ABSA
