= Biosafety cabinet =

Type of laboratory equipment

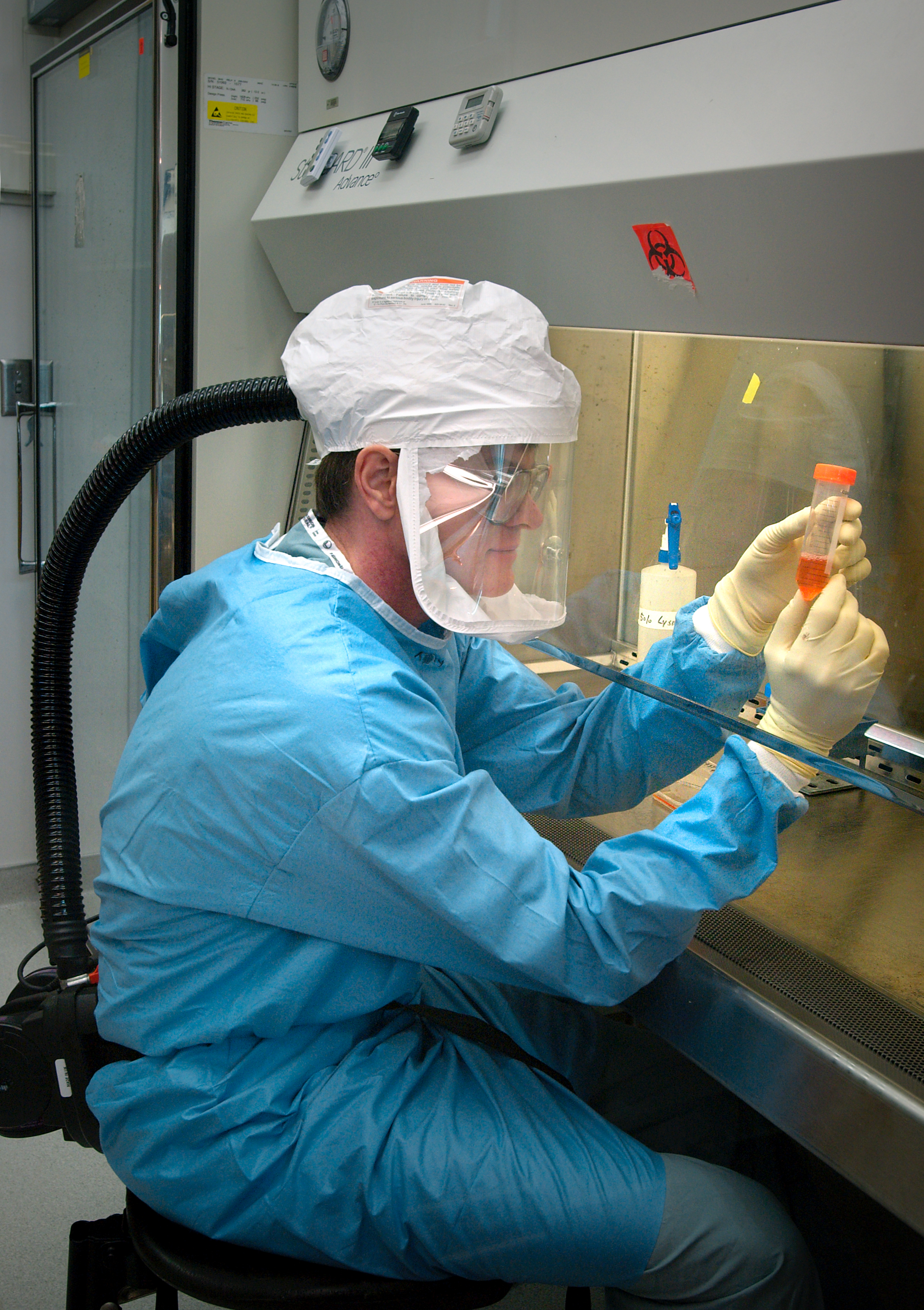
- A microbiologist performing influenza research within a biosafety cabinet
- Acronym: BSC
- Other names: Biological safety cabinet, microbiological safety cabinet
- Uses: Biocontainment
- Related items: Laminar flow cabinet Fume hood Glove box

A biosafety cabinet (BSC)—also called a biological safety cabinet or microbiological safety cabinet—is an enclosed, ventilated laboratory workspace for safely working with materials contaminated with (or potentially contaminated with) pathogens requiring a defined biosafety level. Several different types of BSC exist, differentiated by the degree of biocontainment they provide. BSCs first became commercially available in 1950.

== Purposes ==
The primary purpose of a BSC is to serve as a means to protect the laboratory worker and the surrounding environment from pathogens. All exhaust air is HEPA-filtered as it exits the biosafety cabinet, removing harmful bacteria and viruses. This is in contrast to a laminar flow clean bench, which blows unfiltered exhaust air towards the user and is not safe for work with pathogenic agents. Neither are most BSCs safe for use as fume hoods. Likewise, a fume hood fails to provide the environmental protection that HEPA filtration in a BSC would provide. However, most classes of BSCs have a secondary purpose to maintain the sterility of materials inside (the "product").

== Classes ==
The U.S. Centers for Disease Control and Prevention (CDC) as well as the European EN 12469, classifies BSCs into three classes. These classes and the types of BSCs within them are distinguished in two ways: the level of personnel and environmental protection provided and the level of product protection provided.

=== Class I ===
Class I cabinets provide personnel and environmental protection but no product protection. In fact, the inward flow of air can contribute to contamination of samples. Inward airflow is maintained either at a minimum velocity of 75 ft/min(0.38 m/s), or for the minimum velocity specified on the manufacturer type plate (EN 12469-1:2025). These BSCs are commonly used to enclose specific equipment (e.g. centrifuges) or procedures (e.g. aerating cultures) that potentially generate aerosols. BSCs of this class are either ducted (connected to the building exhaust system) or unducted (recirculating filtered exhaust back into the laboratory).

=== Class II ===
Class II cabinets provide personnel and environmental protection, product protection and cross contamination protection, since makeup air is also HEPA-filtered. In the European standard only one type is specified (EN 12469:2025-2). The American standard diversifies in five types: Type A1 (formerly A), Type A2 (formerly A/B3), Type B1, Type B2 and Type C1. Each of these type's requirements are defined by NSF International Standard 49, which in 2002 reclassified A/B3 cabinets (classified under the latter type if connected to an exhaust duct) as Type A2, and added the Type C1 in the 2016 standard. About 90% of all biosafety cabinets installed are Type A2 cabinets.

Principles of operation use motor driven blowers (fans) mounted in the cabinet to draw directional mass airflow around a user and into the air grille - protecting the operator. The air is then drawn underneath the work surface and back up to the top of the cabinet where it passes through the HEPA filters. A column of HEPA filtered, sterile air is also blown downward, over products and processes to prevent contamination. Air is also exhausted through a HEPA filter, and depending on the Type of Class II BSC, the air is either recirculated back into the laboratory or pulled by an exhaust fan, through ductwork where it is expelled from the building.

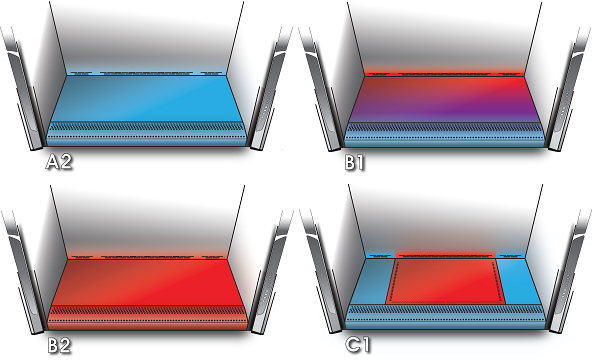
Class II Biosafety Cabinet Types using color to illustrate where it is safe to handle hazardous chemistry with microbiology. (Blue is recirculated air where it is NOT safe to use hazardous chemistry. Red is single pass air and is safe for chemical use. Purple is uncertainty due to location of the BSCs smoke-split)

The Type A1 cabinet, formerly known as Type A, has a minimum inflow velocity of 75 ft/min. The downflow air, considered contaminated, splits just above the work surface (the BSCs smoke split) and mixes with the inflow. This air is drawn, through ductwork, up the back of the cabinet where it is then blown into a positive pressure, contaminated plenum. Here, the air is either recirculated, through a HEPA filter, back down over the work zone, or exhausted out of the cabinet (also through a HEPA filter). Sizing of HEPA filters and an internal damper are used to balance these air volumes. This type is not safe for work with hazardous chemicals even when exhausted with a "thimble" or canopy to avoid disturbing internal air flow.

The Type A2 cabinet, formerly designated A/B3, has a minimum inflow velocity of 100 ft/min. A negative air pressure plenum surrounds all contaminated positive pressure plenums. In other respects, the specifications are identical to those of a Type A1 cabinet.

Type B1 and B2 cabinets have a minimum inflow velocity of 100 ft/min, and these cabinets must be hard-ducted to an exhaust system rather than exhausted through a thimble connection. Their exhaust systems must also be dedicated (one BSC per duct run, per blower). In contrast to the type A1 and A2 cabinets, Type B BSCs use single pass airflow (air that does not mix and recirculate) in order to also control hazardous chemical vapors. Type B1 cabinets split the airflow so that the air behind the smoke-split is directed to the exhaust system, while air between the operator and the smoke-split mixes with inflow air and is recirculated as downflow. Since exhaust air is drawn from the rear grille, the CDC advises that work with hazardous chemistry be conducted in the rear of the cabinet. This is complicated, since the smoke split (demarking the "rear of the cabinet") is an invisible line that extends the width of the cabinet (approximately 10-14 inches from the front grille) and drifts as the internal HEPA filters load with particulate.

The Type B2 cabinet (also known as a Total Exhaust BSC) is expensive to operate because no air is recirculated within. Therefore, this type is mainly found in such applications as toxicology laboratories, where the ability to safely use hazardous chemistry is important. Additionally, there is the risk that contaminated air would flow into the laboratory if the exhaust system for a Type B1 or B2 cabinet were to fail. To mitigate this risk, cabinets of these types generally monitor the exhaust flow, shutting off the supply blower and sounding an alarm if the exhaust flow is insufficient.

=== Class III ===
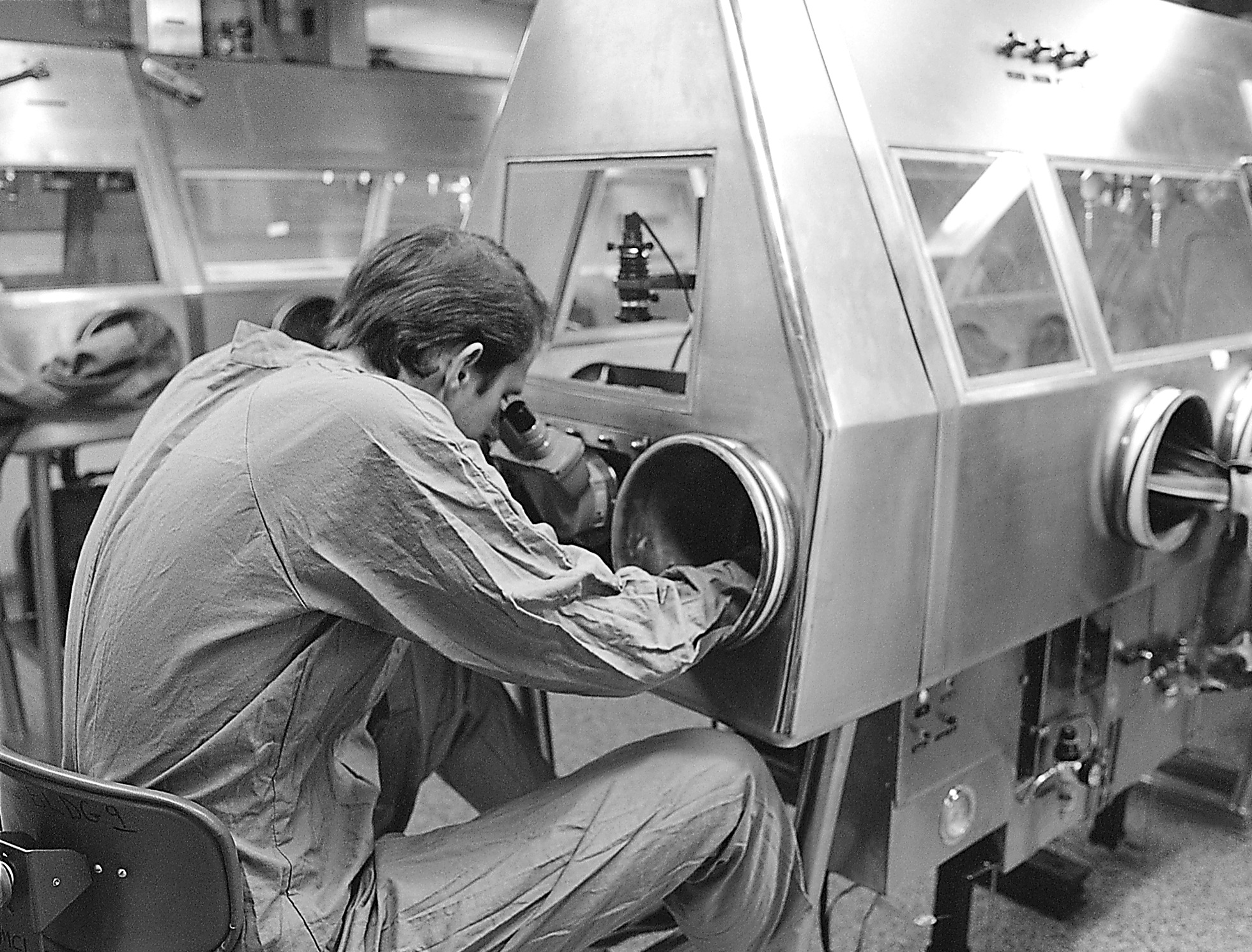
A researcher observing a specimen through the built-in microscope in a Class III biosafety cabinet

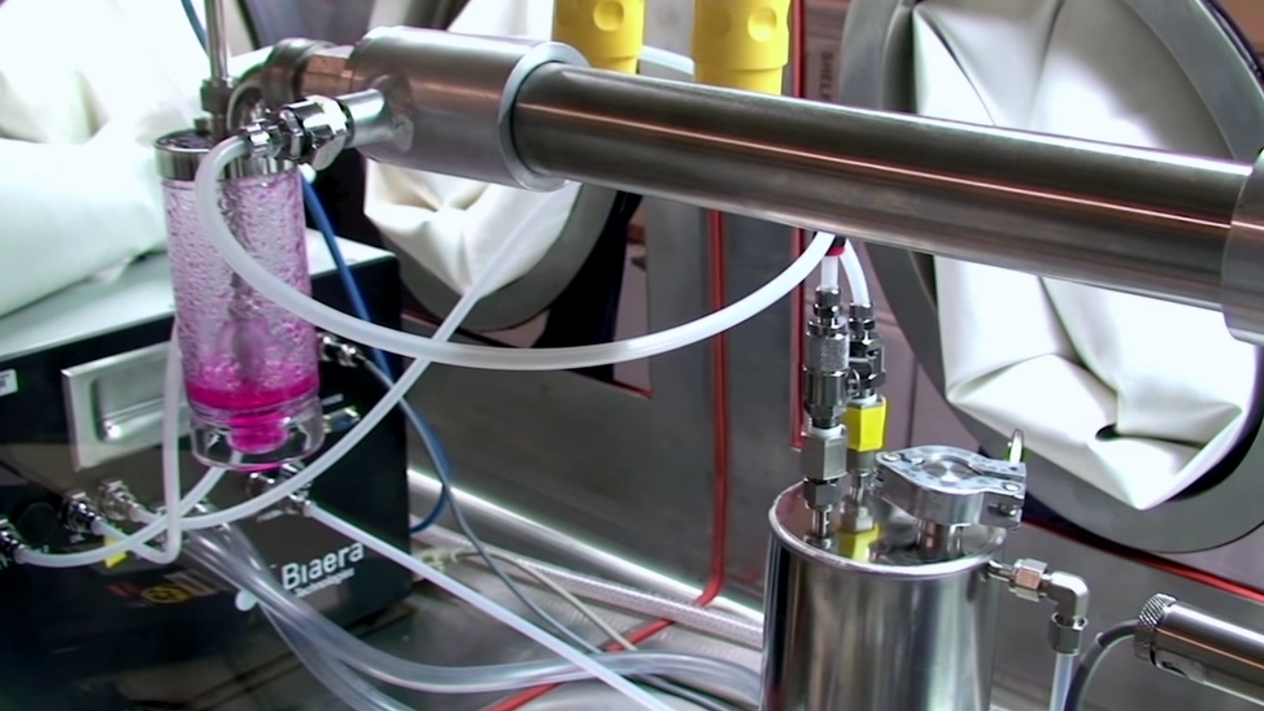
Aerosol control platform inside a Class III Biosafety Cabinet

The Class III cabinet, generally only installed in maximum containment laboratories, is specifically designed for work with BSL-4 pathogenic agents, providing maximum personnel and environmental protection, product protection but by default no cross contamination protection. The enclosure is gas-tight, and all materials enter and leave through a dunk tank or double-door autoclave. Gloves attached to the front prevent direct contact with hazardous materials (Class III cabinets are sometimes called glove boxes). Although the EN 12469 is a standard for Class III products, this are often custom-built cabinets attach into a line, and the lab equipment installed inside is usually custom-built as well.

== Ergonomics ==
Biosafety cabinets are used on a daily basis for hours. Besides protection of user and sample material, the human design factors (ergonomics) of the work become more and more important. This includes reduction of the noise level (for a more convenient working atmosphere), a height adjustable stand or stool and footrest (for optimized sitting position), panorama side windows (more light within cabinet), 10° angled front sash (enables better sitting position), strong light sources (better view within cabinet), forearm support for comfort and safety, as well as extended access openings and sloped viewing windows to improve the working conditions.

== Ultraviolet lamps ==
The CDC, as well as the European standard (EN 12469-1:2025, paragraph 6.5) does not recommend the installation of UV lamps in BSCs. The American Biological Safety Association, citing the safety risk to personnel, shallow penetration, reduced effectiveness in high relative humidity, and the frequent need to clean and replace the bulb. UV lamps should not be used as a primary source of surface decontamination within a BSC. However, these assertions have been formally disputed in at least one peer-reviewed article which points out that:

- There is no cited basis for the need to remove dust and dirt from bulbs
- Properly functioning biosafety cabinets have very clean air so dust is less likely to build up
- Laboratories are generally air-conditioned which eliminates the concern over humidity inhibition of UV effectiveness
- With proper use UV exposure risk to users is very low
- UV disinfection is effective for germicide and virucide as well as inhibiting DNA contamination for PCR
- UV disinfection has the advantage of not leaving residues like physical disinfectants
- The relative safety and risks of UV versus other disinfection techniques (which also entail risks) should be considered

== Maintenance and service ==
Biological safety cabinets are generally required to comply with that country or region's standards. This requirement may be governed by an institutional body such as the TGA, FDA or WHO. Within Australia, for example, Class II BSCs are required to meet construction standards entitled AS2252.2. Those standards reference several other standards, such as AS2243.3. AS2243.3 classifies the level of risk that microorganisms pose based on their pathogenicity, mode of transmission, and host range, along with current preventative measures and effective treatments.

There are specific field test requirements for class II BSC's. The United States' base for field testing is NSF49; Europe relies on EN12469; and Australia has the AS1807 series of test methods (referenced within AS2252.2). The field test requirements may include:

- Air velocity within the work zone.
- Air barrier testing (barrier between operator and product; some standards utilise inward velocity testing instead)
- Filter integrity (leak testing or the amount of aerosols that a filter allows to pass through it)
- Particle counting within the work zone
- Gas tightness
- Leak testing of the work zone (work zone integrity testing)
- Illuminance within work zone
- UV light effectiveness
- Sound level

In general terms, a regular service maintenance schedule may include the following tasks:

- Airflow and filter capacities are verified. The filters have a limited lifespan, determined by the air quality within the laboratory space, the amount of particles & aerosols generated inside the BSC work zone, and the volume of air passing through the filters. As these filters load, the internal fan is required to do more work to push/pull the same volume of air through them. Newer cabinets measure the airflow constantly and self-compensate fan performance to ensure constant volumes of air moving through the filters and the cabinet. However, self-adjusting cabinets should be cross-verified by calibrated instruments to ensure that performance is maintained to the correct levels. If the flow drops below desired performance, an audio and visual alarm will alert the operator. Changing the filter should be limited to trained persons as the filter is potentially contaminated. This can be done either after the cabinet has been decontaminated using a gaseous procedure (using formaldehyde, chlorine dioxide, or vaporized hydrogen peroxide) or a "bag-in/bag-out" procedure.
- UV lights are checked and changed. UV lights decrease in power over time, resulting in diminished disinfection of the working area.

== Work practices ==
As with work on open bench tops, work performed within a BSC must be performed carefully and safely. To avoid contamination and the risk of personnel exposure, the CDC advises investigators to follow best practices to reduce and control splatter and aerosol generation, such as keeping clean materials at least 12 inches (30 cm) from aerosol-generating activities and arranging the work flow "from clean to contaminated". In particular, open flames, not necessary within the clean environment of a Class II or III BSC, cause disruption of the airflow inside. Once work inside a BSC has been completed, it is necessary to decontaminate the surfaces of the BSC as with other lab equipment and materials.

When a BSC is serviced or relocated, including replacement of HEPA filters, it must be gas decontaminated. Gas decontamination involves filling the BSC with a poisonous gas, most commonly some form of vaporised hydrogen peroxide, chlorine dioxide or formaldehyde.. Formaldehyde however is a know human carcinogen which is heavily restricted or banned in European countries.

== See also ==
- Fume hood
- Laminar flow cabinet
