= Biosafety =

Prevention of large-scale loss of biological integrity

Biosafety is the prevention of large-scale loss of biological integrity, focusing both on ecology and human health. These prevention mechanisms include the conduction of regular reviews of biosafety in laboratory settings, as well as strict guidelines to follow. Biosafety is used to protect from harmful incidents. Many laboratories handling biohazards employ an ongoing risk management assessment and enforcement process for biosafety. Failures to follow such protocols can lead to increased risk of exposure to biohazards or pathogens. Human error and poor technique contribute to unnecessary exposure and compromise the best safeguards set into place for protection.

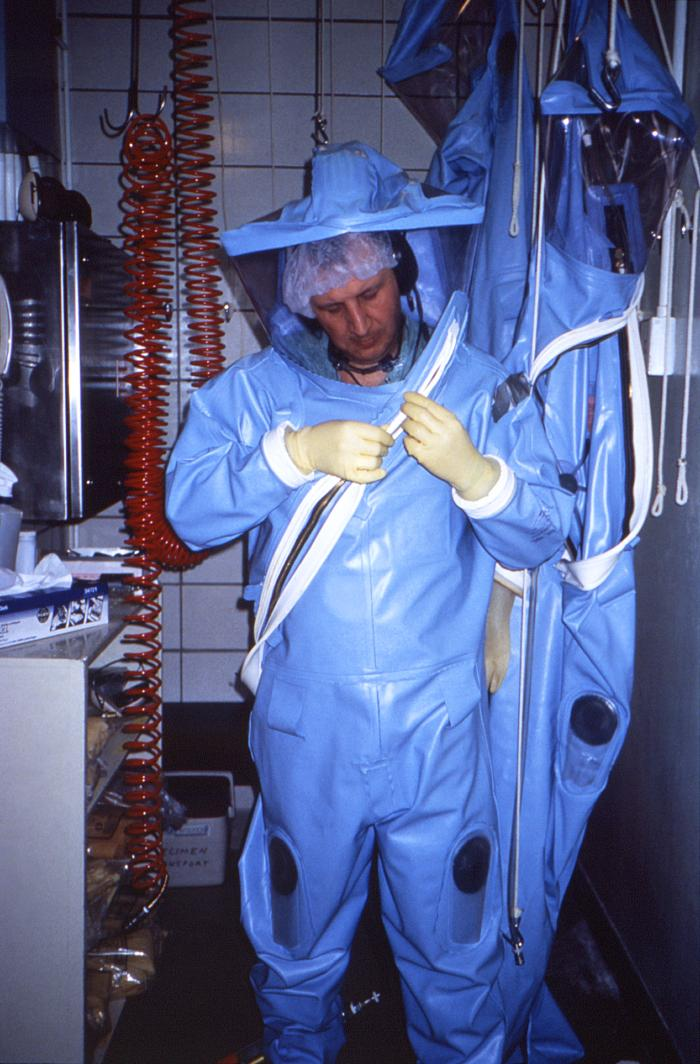
Positive-pressure biosafety suit

The international Cartagena Protocol on Biosafety deals primarily with the agricultural definition but many advocacy groups seek to expand it to include post-genetic threats: new molecules, artificial life forms, and even robots which may compete directly in the natural food chain.

Biosafety in agriculture, chemistry, medicine, exobiology and beyond will likely require the application of the precautionary principle, and a new definition focused on the biological nature of the threatened organism rather than the nature of the threat.

When biological warfare or new, currently hypothetical, threats (i.e., robots, new artificial bacteria) are considered, biosafety precautions are generally not sufficient. The new field of biosecurity addresses these complex threats.

Biosafety level refers to the stringency of biocontainment precautions deemed necessary by the Centers for Disease Control and Prevention (CDC) for laboratory work with infectious materials.

Typically, institutions that experiment with or create potentially harmful biological material will have a committee or board of supervisors that is in charge of the institution's biosafety. They create and monitor the biosafety standards that must be met by labs in order to prevent the accidental release of potentially destructive biological material. (In the US, several groups are involved, but there is no unifying regulatory authority for all labs.)

Biosafety is related to several fields:

- In ecology (referring to imported life forms from beyond ecoregion borders),
- In agriculture (reducing the risk of alien viral or transgenic genes, genetic engineering or prions such as BSE/"MadCow", reducing the risk of food bacterial contamination)
- In medicine (referring to organs or tissues from biological origin, or genetic therapy products, virus; levels of lab containment protocols measured as 1, 2, 3, 4 in rising order of danger),
- In chemistry (i.e., nitrates in water, PCB levels affecting fertility)
- In exobiology (i.e., NASA's policy for containing alien microbes that may exist on space samples. See planetary protection and interplanetary contamination), and
- In synthetic biology (referring to the risks associated with this type of lab practice)

== Hazards ==
Chemical hazards typically found in laboratory settings include carcinogens, toxins, irritants, corrosives, and sensitizers. Biological hazards include viruses, bacteria, fungi, prions, and biologically derived toxins, which may be present in body fluids and tissue, cell culture specimens, and laboratory animals. Routes of exposure for chemical and biological hazards include inhalation, ingestion, skin contact, and eye contact.

Physical hazards include ergonomic hazards, ionizing and non-ionizing radiation, and noise hazards. Additional safety hazards include burns and cuts from autoclaves, injuries from centrifuges, compressed gas leaks, cold burns from cryogens, electrical hazards, fires, injuries from machinery, and falls.

== In synthetic biology ==
A complete understanding of experimental risks associated with synthetic biology is helping to enforce the knowledge and effectiveness of biosafety. With the potential future creation of man-made unicellular organisms, some are beginning to consider the effect that these organisms will have on biomass already present. Scientists estimate that within the next few decades, organism design will be sophisticated enough to accomplish tasks such as creating biofuels and lowering the levels of harmful substances in the atmosphere. Scientist that favor the development of synthetic biology claim that the use of biosafety mechanisms such as suicide genes and nutrient dependencies will ensure the organisms cannot survive outside of the lab setting in which they were originally created. Organizations like the ETC Group argue that regulations should control the creation of organisms that could potentially harm existing life. They also argue that the development of these organisms will simply shift the consumption of petroleum to the utilization of biomass in order to create energy. These organisms can harm existing life by affecting the prey/predator food chain, reproduction between species, as well as competition against other species (species at risk, or act as an invasive species). Synthetic vaccines are now being produced in the lab. These have caused a lot of excitement in the pharmaceutical industry as they will be cheaper to produce, allow quicker production, as well as enhance the knowledge of virology and immunology.

== In medicine, healthcare settings and laboratories ==
Biosafety, in medicine and health care settings, specifically refers to proper handling of organs or tissues from biological origin, or genetic therapy products, viruses with respect to the environment, to ensure the safety of health care workers, researchers, lab staff, patients, and the general public. Laboratories are assigned a biosafety level numbered 1 through 4 based on their potential biohazard risk level. The employing authority, through the laboratory director, is responsible for ensuring that there is adequate surveillance of the health of laboratory personnel. The objective of such surveillance is to monitor for occupationally acquired diseases. The World Health Organization attributes human error and poor technique as the primary cause of mishandling of biohazardous materials.

Biosafety is also becoming a global concern and requires multilevel resources and international collaboration to monitor, prevent and correct accidents from unintended and malicious release and also to prevent that bioterrorists get their hands-on biologics sample to create biologic weapons of mass destruction. Even people outside of the health sector needs to be involved as in the case of the Ebola outbreak the impact that it had on businesses and travel required that private sectors, international banks together pledged more than $2 billion to combat the epidemic. The bureau of international Security and nonproliferation (ISN) is responsible for managing a broad range of U.S. nonproliferation policies, programs, agreements, and initiatives, and biological weapon is one their concerns Biosafety has its risks and benefits. All stakeholders must try to find a balance between cost-effectiveness of safety measures and use evidence-based safety practices and recommendations, measure the outcomes and consistently reevaluate the potential benefits that biosafety represents for human health. Biosafety level designations are based on a composite of the design features, construction, containment facilities, equipment, practices and operational procedures required for working with agents from the various risk groups.

In particular, there is a concern that so-called "gain-of-function research" can pose risks regarding biosafety and biosecurity.

Classification of biohazardous materials is subjective and the risk assessment is determined by the individuals most familiar with the specific characteristics of the organism. There are several factors taken into account when assessing an organism and the classification process.

- Risk Group 1: (no or low individual and community risk) A microorganism that is unlikely to cause human or animal disease.
- Risk Group 2 : (moderate individual risk, low community risk) A pathogen that can cause human or animal disease but is unlikely to be a serious hazard to laboratory workers, the community, livestock or the environment. Laboratory exposures may cause serious infection, but effective treatment and preventive measures are available and the risk of spread of infection is limited.
- Risk Group 3 : (high individual risk, low community risk) A pathogen that usually causes serious human or animal disease but does not ordinarily spread from one infected individual to another. Effective treatment and preventive measures are available.
- Risk Group 4 : (high individual and community risk) A pathogen that usually causes serious human or animal disease and that can be readily transmitted from one individual to another, directly or indirectly. Effective treatment and preventive measures are not usually available.

See World Health Organization Biosafety Laboratory Guidelines (4th edition, 2020): World Health Organization Biosafety Laboratory Guidelines

Investigations have shown that there are hundreds of unreported biosafety accidents, with laboratories self-policing the handling of biohazardous materials and lack of reporting. Poor record keeping, improper disposal, and mishandling biohazardous materials result in increased risks of biochemical contamination for both the public and environment.

Along with the precautions taken during the handling process of biohazardous materials, the World Health Organization recommends: Staff training should always include information on safe methods for highly hazardous procedures that are commonly encountered by all laboratory personnel, and which involve:

1. Inhalation risks (i.e. aerosol production) when using loops, streaking agar plates,
2. pipetting, making smears, opening cultures, taking blood/serum samples, centrifuging, etc.
3. Ingestion risks when handling specimens, smears and cultures
4. Risks of percutaneous exposures when using syringes and needles
5. Bites and scratches when handling animals
6. Handling of blood and other potentially hazardous pathological materials
7. Decontamination and disposal of infectious material.

== Biosafety management in laboratory ==
First of all the laboratory director, who holds immediate responsibility for the laboratory, is tasked with ensuring the development and adoption of a biosafety management plan as well as a safety or operations manual. Secondly, the laboratory supervisor, who reports to the laboratory director, is responsible for organizing regular training sessions on laboratory safety.

The third point, the personnel must be informed about any special hazards and be required to review the safety or operations manual and adhere to established practices and procedures. The laboratory supervisor is responsible for ensuring that all personnel have a clear understanding of these guidelines, and a copy of the safety or operations manual should be readily available within the laboratory. Finally, adequate medical assessment, monitoring, and treatment must be made available to all personnel when needed, and comprehensive medical records should be maintained.

== Policy and practice in the United States ==
=== Legal information ===
In June 2009, the Trans-Federal Task Force on Optimizing Biosafety and Biocontainment Oversight recommended the formation of an agency to coordinate high safety risk level labs (3 and 4), and voluntary, non-punitive measures for incident reporting. However, it is unclear as to what changes may or may not have been implemented following their recommendations.

==== United States Code of Federal Regulations ====
The United States Code of Federal Regulations is the codification (law), or collection of laws specific to a specific to a jurisdiction that represent broad areas subject to federal regulation. Title 42 of the Code of Federal Regulations addresses laws concerning Public Health issues including biosafety which can be found under the citation 42 CFR 73 to 42 CFR 73.21 by accessing the US Code of Federal Regulations (CFR) website.

International Biohazard Warning Symbol

Title 42 Section 73 of the CFR addresses specific aspects of biosafety including occupational safety and health, transportation of biohazardous materials and safety plans for laboratories using potential biohazards. While biocontainment, as defined in the Biosafety in Microbiological and Biomedical Laboratories and Primary Containment for Biohazards: Selection, Installation and Use of Biosafety Cabinets manuals available at the Centers for Disease Control and Prevention website much of the design, implementation and monitoring of protocols are left up to state and local authorities.

The United States CFR states "An individual or entity required to register [as a user of biological agents] must develop and implement a written biosafety plan that is commensurate with the risk of the select agent or toxin" which is followed by three recommended sources for laboratory reference:

1. The CDC/NIH publication, "Biosafety in Microbiological and Biomedical Laboratories."
2. The Occupational Safety and Health Administration (OSHA) regulations in 29 CFR parts 1910.1200 and 1910.1450.
3. The "NIH Guidelines for Research Involving Recombinant DNA Molecules" (NIH Guidelines).

While clearly the needs of biocontainment and biosafety measures vary across government, academic and private industry laboratories, biological agents pose similar risks independent of their locale. Laws relating to biosafety are not easily accessible and there are few federal regulations that are readily available for a potential trainee to reference outside of the publications recommended in 42 CFR 73.12. Therefore, training is the responsibility of lab employers and is not consistent across various laboratory types thereby increasing the risk of accidental release of biological hazards that pose serious health threats to the humans, animals and the ecosystem as a whole.

==== Agency guidance ====
Many government agencies have made guidelines and recommendations in an effort to increase biosafety measures across laboratories in the United States. Agencies involved in producing policies surrounding biosafety within a hospital, pharmacy or clinical research laboratory include: the CDC, FDA, USDA, DHHS, DoT, EPA and potentially other local organizations including public health departments. The federal government does set some standards and recommendations for States to meet their standards, most of which fall under the Occupational Safety and Health Act of 1970. but currently, there is no single federal regulating agency directly responsible for ensuring the safety of biohazardous handling, storage, identification, clean-up and disposal. In addition to the CDC, the Environmental Protection Agency has some of the most accessible information on ecological impacts of biohazards, how to handle spills, reporting guidelines and proper disposal of agents dangerous to the environment. Many of these agencies have their own manuals and guidance documents relating to training and certain aspects of biosafety directly tied to their agency's scope, including transportation, storage and handling of blood borne pathogens (OSHA, IATA). The American Biological Safety Association (ABSA) has a list of such agencies and links to their websites, along with links to publications and guidance documents to assist in risk assessment, lab design and adherence to laboratory exposure control plans. Many of these agencies were members of the 2009 Task Force on BioSafety. There was also a formation of a Blue Ribbon Study Panel on Biodefense, but this is more concerned with national defense programs and biosecurity.

Ultimately states and local governments, as well as private industry labs, are left to make the final determinants for their own biosafety programs, which vary widely in scope and enforcement across the United States. Not all state programs address biosafety from all necessary perspectives, which should not just include personal safety, but also emphasize a full understanding among laboratory personnel of quality control and assurance, exposure potential impacts on the environment, and general public safety.

Toby Ord puts into question whether the current international conventions regarding biotechnology research and development regulation, and self-regulation by biotechnology companies and the scientific community are adequate.

State occupational safety plans are often focused on transportation, disposal, and risk assessment, allowing caveats for safety audits, but ultimately leaves the training in the hands of the employer. 22 states have approved Occupational Safety plans by OSHA that are audited annually for effectiveness. These plans apply to private and public sector workers, and not necessarily state/ government workers, and not all specifically have a comprehensive program for all aspects of biohazard management from start to finish. Sometimes biohazard management plans are limited only to workers in transportation specific job titles. The enforcement and training on such regulations can vary from lab to lab based on the State's plans for occupational health and safety. With the exception of DoD lab personnel, CDC lab personnel, First responders, and DoT employees, enforcement of training is inconsistent, and while training is required to be done, specifics on the breadth and frequency of refresher training does not seem consistent from state to state; penalties may never be assessed without larger regulating bodies being aware of non-compliance, and enforcement is limited.

==== Medical waste management in the United States ====
Medical waste management was identified as an issue in the 1980s, with the Medical Waste Tracking Act of 1988 becoming the new standard in biohazard waste disposal.

Although the Federal Government, EPA & DOT provide some oversight of regulated medical waste storage, transportation, and disposal the majority of biohazard medical waste is regulated at the state level. Each state is responsible for regulation and management of their own biohazardous waste with each state varying in their regulatory process. Record keeping of biohazardous waste also varies between states.

Medical healthcare centers, hospitals veterinary clinics, clinical laboratories and other facilities generate over one million tons of waste each year. Although the majority of this waste is as harmless as common household waste, as much as 15 percent of this waste poses a potential infection hazard, according to the Environmental Protection Agency (EPA). Medical waste is required to be rendered non-infectious before it can be disposed of. There are several different methods to treat and dispose of biohazardous waste. In the United States, the primary methods for treatment and disposal of biohazard, medical and sharps waste may include:

- Incineration
- Microwave
- Autoclaves
- Mechanical/Chemical Disinfection
- Irradiation

Different forms of biohazardous wasted required different treatments for their proper waste management. This is determined largely be each states regulations.

=== Incidents of non-compliance and reform efforts ===
The United States Government has made it clear that biosafety is to be taken very seriously. In 2014, incidents with anthrax and Ebola pathogens in CDC laboratories prompted the CDC director Tom Frieden to issue a moratorium for research with these types of select agents. An investigation concluded that there was a lack of adherence to safety protocols and "inadequate safeguards" in place. This indicated a lack of proper training or reinforcement of training and supervision on regular basis for lab personnel.

Following these incidents, the CDC established an External Laboratory Safety Workgroup (ELSW), and suggestions have been made to reform effectiveness of the Federal Select Agent Program. The White House issued a report on national biosafety priorities in 2015, outlining next steps for a national biosafety and security program, and addressed biological safety needs for health research, national defense, and public safety.

In 2016, the Association of Public Health Laboratories (APHL) had a presentation at their annual meeting focused on improving biosafety culture. This same year, The UPMC Center for Health Security issued a case study report including reviews of ten different nations' current biosafety regulations, including the United States. Their goal was to "provide a foundation for identifying national-level biosafety norms and enable initial assessment of biosafety priorities necessary for developing effective national biosafety regulation and oversight."

== See also ==
- Biological hazard
- Cartagena Protocol on Biosafety
- Centers for Disease Control
- European BioSafety Association
- Interplanetary contamination
- Quarantine
