= Laminar flow cabinet =

Type of laboratory equipment used to prevent contamination of samples

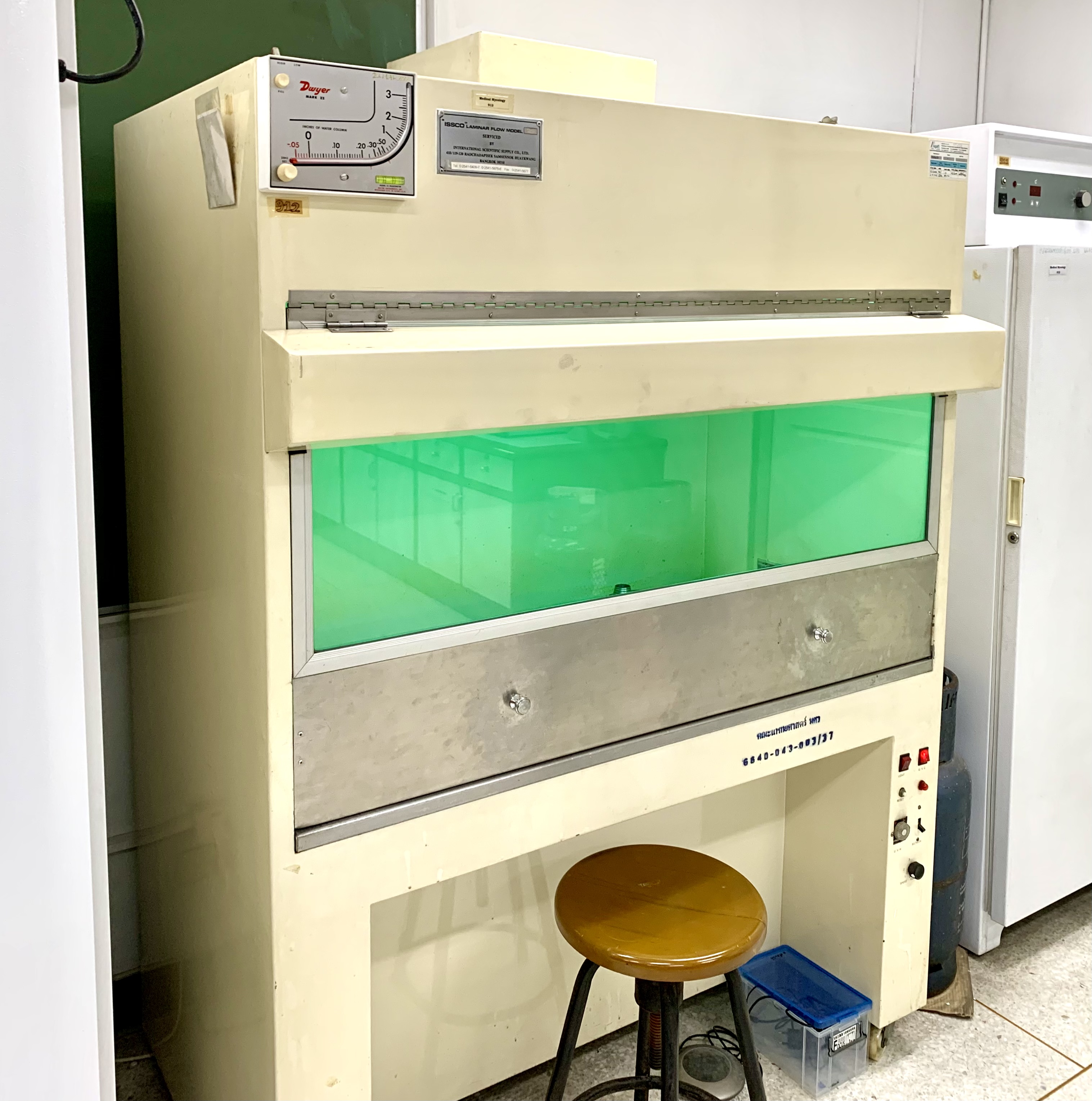
- Laminar flow cabinet
- Other names: Laminar flow hood Laminar flow closet
- Uses: Particulate removal
- Related items: Biosafety cabinet Fume hood

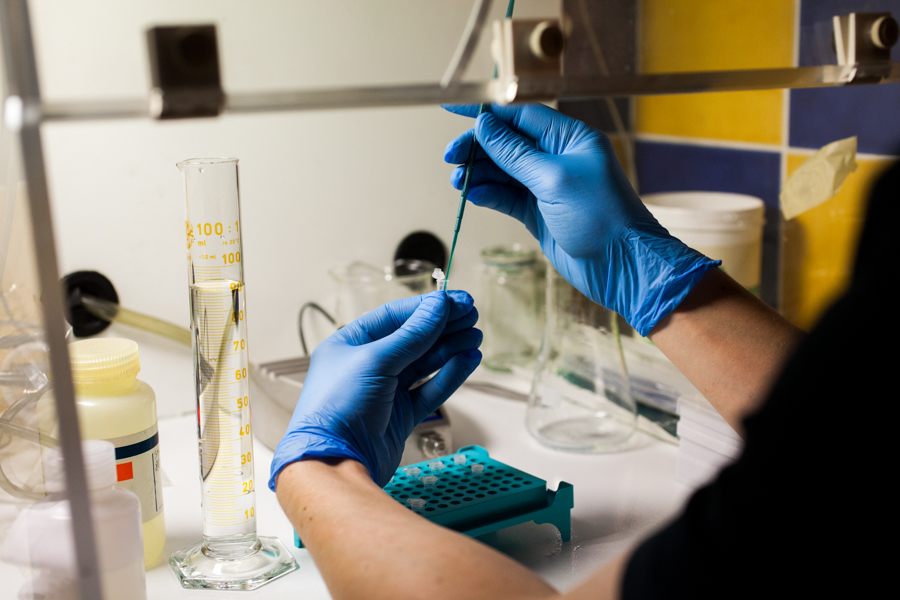
Preparation of microbiological samples in a laminar chamber

A laminar flow cabinet or tissue culture hood is a partially enclosed bench work surface designed to prevent contamination of biological samples, semiconductor wafer, or any particle-sensitive materials. Air is drawn through a HEPA filter and blown in a very smooth laminar flow in a narrow vertical curtain, separating the interior of the cabinet from the environment around it. The cabinet is usually made of stainless steel with no gaps or joints where spores might collect.

Despite their similar appearance, a laminar flow cabinet is not to be confused with a fume hood. A laminar flow cabinet blows unfiltered exhaust air towards the worker and is not safe for work with pathogenic agents, while a fume hood maintains negative pressure with constant exhaust to protect the user, but does not protect the work materials from contamination by the surrounding environment.

A biosafety cabinet is also easily-confused with a laminar flow cabinet, but like the fume hood is primarily designed to protect the worker rather than the biological samples. This is achieved by drawing surrounding air in and exhausting it through a HEPA filter to remove potentially hazardous microorganisms.

Laminar flow cabinets exist in both horizontal and vertical configurations, and there are many different types of cabinets with a variety of airflow patterns and acceptable uses. Cabinets may have a UV-C germicidal lamp to sterilize the interior and contents before use to prevent contamination of the experiment. Germicidal lamps are usually kept on for fifteen minutes to sterilize the interior before the cabinet is used. The light must be switched off when the cabinet is being used to limit exposure to skin and eyes, as stray ultraviolet light emissions can cause cancer and cataracts.

== See also ==
- Asepsis
- Biosafety cabinet
- Fume hood
