= Fume hood =

Type of local ventilation device

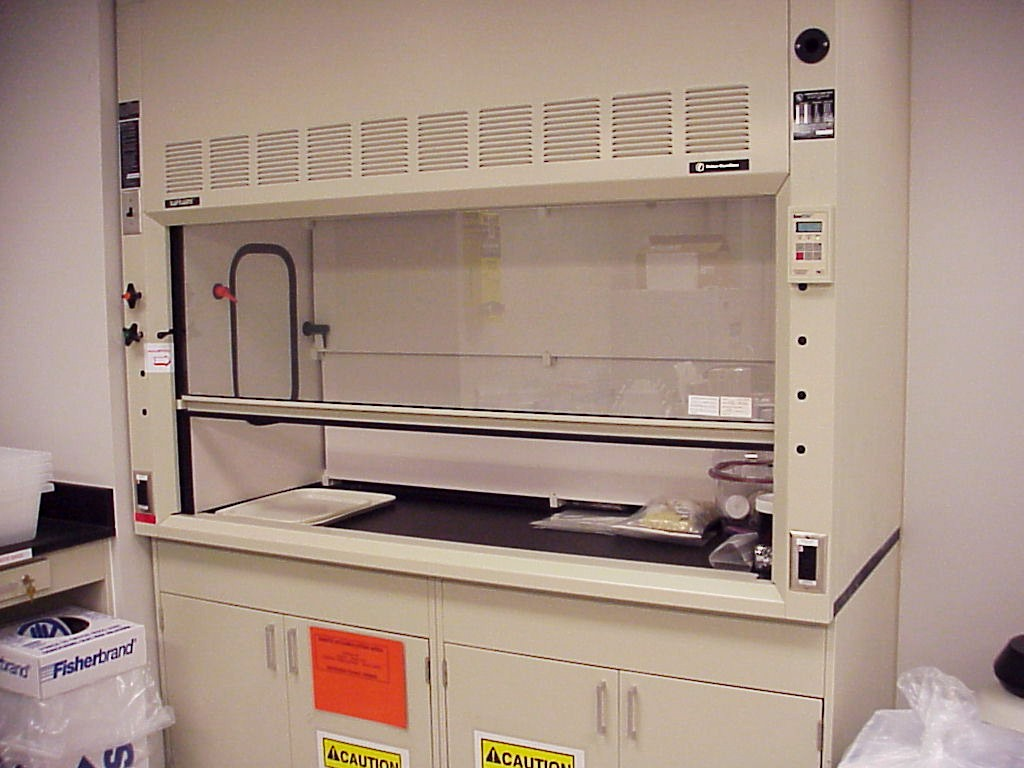
- A common modern ducted fume hood
- Other names: Hood; Fume cupboard; Fume closet
- Uses: Fume removal; Blast or flame shield
- Related items: Laminar flow cabinet Biosafety cabinet

A fume hood (sometimes called a fume cupboard or fume closet, not to be confused with extractor hood) is a type of local exhaust ventilation device that is designed to prevent users from being exposed to hazardous fumes, vapors, and dusts. The device is an enclosure with a movable sash window on one side that traps and exhausts gases and particulates either out of the area (through a duct) or back into the room (through air filtration), and is most frequently used in laboratory settings.

The first fume hoods, constructed from wood and glass, were developed in the early 1900s as a measure to protect individuals from harmful gaseous reaction by-products. Later developments in the 1970s and 80s allowed for the construction of more efficient devices out of epoxy powder-coated steel and flame-retardant plastic laminates. Contemporary fume hoods are built to various standards to meet the needs of different laboratory practices. They may be built to different sizes, with some demonstration models small enough to be moved between locations on an island and bigger "walk-in" designs that can enclose large equipment. They may also be constructed to allow for the safe handling and ventilation of perchloric acid and radionuclides and may be equipped with scrubber systems. Fume hoods of all types require regular maintenance to ensure the safety of users.

Most fume hoods are ducted and vent air out of the room they are built in, which constantly removes conditioned air from a room and thus results in major energy costs for laboratories and academic institutions. Efforts to curtail the energy use associated with fume hoods have been researched since the early 2000s, resulting in technical advances, such as variable air volume, high-performance and occupancy sensor-enabled fume hoods, as well as the promulgation of "Shut the Sash" campaigns that promote closing the window on fume hoods that are not in use to reduce the volume of air drawn from a room.

== History ==
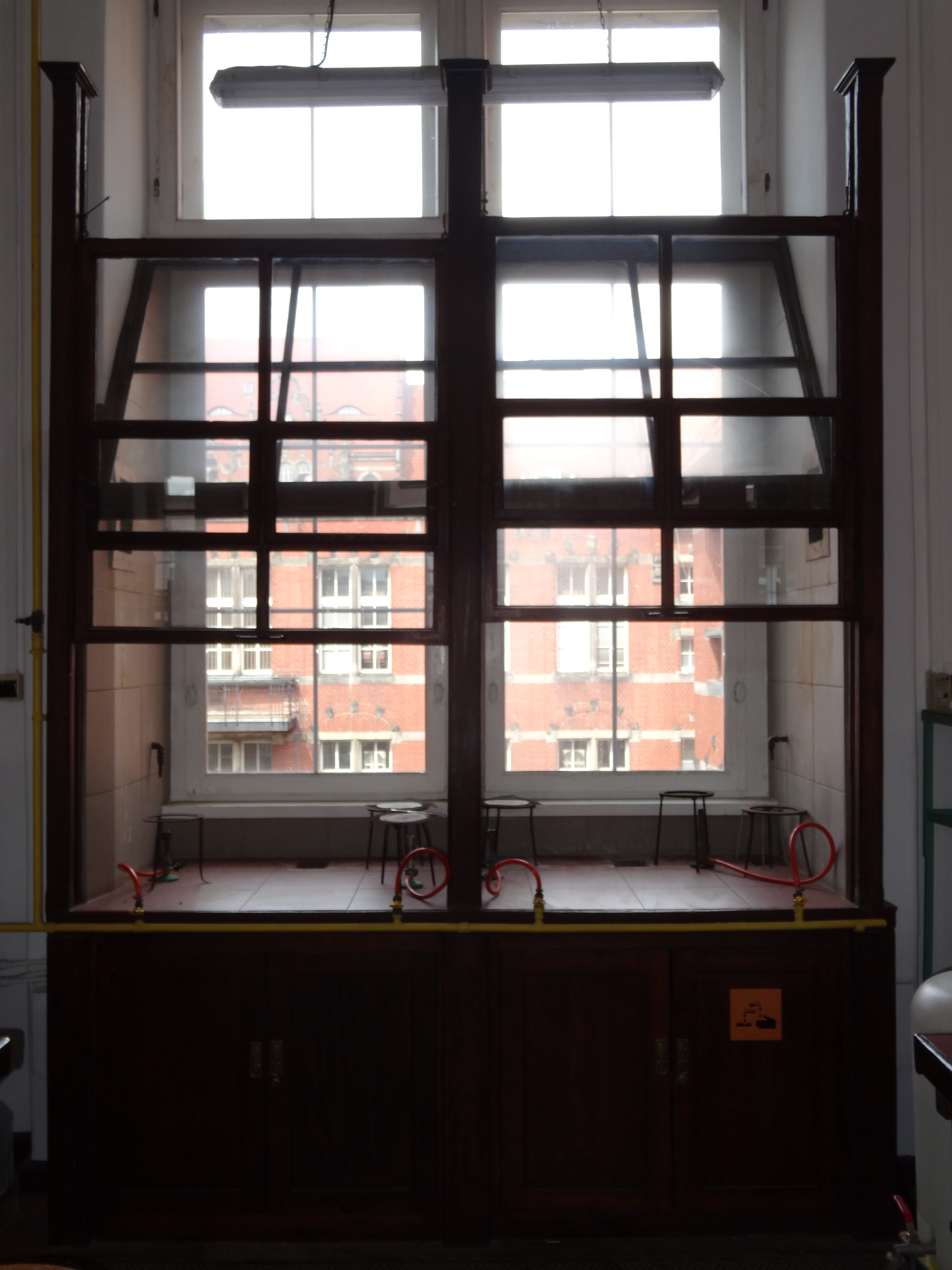
Wooden fume hood at Gdansk University of Technology (2016 picture of 1904 installation still in use)

The need for ventilation has been apparent from early days of chemical research and education. Some early approaches to the problem were adaptations of the conventional chimney. A hearth constructed by Thomas Jefferson in 1822–1826 at the University of Virginia was equipped with a sand bath and special flues to vent toxic gases. The draft of a chimney was also used by Thomas Edison to provide ventilation in his work around the year 1900.

In 1904 the newly built Faculty of Chemistry at the Technical University in Gdańsk was equipped with fume hoods made of wood and glass in auditoria, several lecture rooms, student laboratories and rooms for scientists. Vertical sliding front glass panels protected from fumes and explosions. Each fume hood was illuminated, equipped with gas for heating, and running water with a drain. Harmful and corrosive gaseous reaction byproducts were actively removed using the natural draft of a fireplace chimney. This early design is still functioning after over 110 years.

The first known modern "fume cupboard" design with rising sashes was introduced at the University of Leeds in 1923. 13 years later, Labconco, now a prominent fume hood manufacturer, developed the first fume hood for commercial sale, reminiscent of modern designs with a front-facing sash window. Soon after, in 1943 during World War II, John Weber, Jr. developed a fume hood concept with a dedicated exhaust fan, vertically rising sash window, and constant face velocity in response to concerns about exposure to toxic and radioactive substances. This design would become standard among atomic laboratories at the time, and many aspects of his concept are incorporated in modern fume hood designs.

The first mass-produced fume hoods were variously manufactured from stone and glass, most likely soapstone or transite, though stainless steel was being used by at least the 1960s. Labconco introduced the concept of a fume hood lined with fiberglass to improve durability and chemical resistance, though from the 1990s onward, epoxy powder-coated steel, teflon and polypropylene coatings were being recommended by literature for use in fume hood and exhaust construction.

== Description ==
Air flow in a fume hood demonstrated by dry ice fog

A fume hood is typically a large piece of equipment enclosing six sides of a work area (including a movable sash window or door), the bottom of which is most commonly located at a standing work height (at least 28 to 34 inches (71 to 86 cm) above the floor). Fume hoods are most often found in laboratories that require the use of materials that may produce harmful particulates, gaseous by-products, or aerosols of hazardous materials such as those found in biocontainment laboratories.

Two main types of fume hood exist: Ducted and recirculating (ductless). The principle is the same for both types: air is drawn in from the front (open) side of the cabinet, and either expelled outside the building or made safe through filtration and fed back into the room. This method of airflow control is intended to:

- protect the user from hazardous substances
- protect the product or experiment
- protect the environment (when the exhaust air is filtered or otherwise prevented from escaping the work area)
- provide ventilation of the space

Secondary functions of these devices may include explosion protection, spill containment, and other functions necessary to the work being done within the device; these functions may be achieved through enclosure design, duct design, and optimal placement of the fume hood in a room.

Fume hoods are generally set back against the walls and are often fitted with infills above, to cover up the exhaust ductwork. Because of their recessed shape they are generally poorly illuminated by general room lighting, so many have internal lights with vapor-proof covers. The front of the device includes a sash window, usually in glass or otherwise transparent glazing, which is able to slide vertically or horizontally. Specialty enclosures for teaching may allow for additional visibility by constructing the sides and back of the unit from tempered glass, intended so that several individuals can look into a fume hood at once, though they often have poorer ventilation capabilities. Some demonstration models built for educational purposes are movable, can be transported between locations or are built on a movable island, and may be ductless; they are often built with less demanding restrictions on chemical resistance, but offer other advantages, such as lower energy costs.

Fume hoods are generally available in 5 different widths; 1000 mm, 1200 mm, 1500 mm, 1800 mm and 2000 mm. The depth varies between 700 mm and 900 mm, and the height between 1900 mm and 2700 mm. Regions that use primarily non-metric measurements often follow construction standards that round these dimensions to the closest value in inches or feet. These designs can accommodate from one to three operators. All modern designs are required to be fitted with air flow meters to ensure that the hood is working properly while in use.

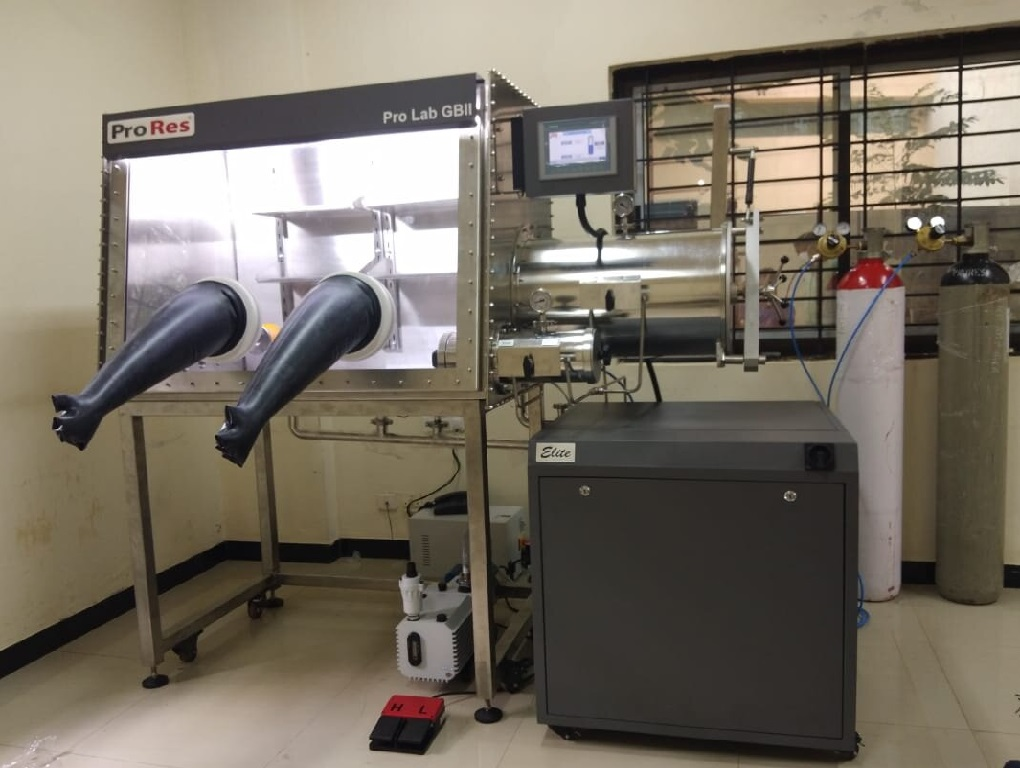
Glovebox with inert gas purification system

For exceptionally hazardous materials, an enclosed glovebox or class III biosafety cabinet may be used, which completely isolates the operator from all direct physical contact with the work material and tools.

=== Build materials ===
The frame and build materials used for a fume hood are selected based on anticipated chemical and environmental exposures over the life of the equipment. Several common materials used for the exterior construction of a modern fume hood include:

- Mild steel, powder coated: The traditional method of building fume cupboards is from a zinc coated mild steel. The cost is often low, but has corrosion issues over time and a high carbon footprint to manufacture. Powder coatings may be made from epoxy or other plastics, such as polyvinyl chloride.
- Stainless steel: Typically used in radioactive applications, in cleanrooms, or in ATEX environments, as the material is easy to decontaminate. Stainless steel is less common than other materials due to its chemical vulnerability and cost.
- Polypropylene: A build material with greater chemical resistance than some contemporary materials. Also used in cleanrooms. Lower cost than mild steel or stainless steel, but less heat resistant.

Manufacturers variously construct sash windows out of safety glass, tempered glass, high impact polyvinyl chloride, or plexiglass. The most common configuration of a sash window is a type that slides vertically and is counterbalanced for ease of movement when using heavy glass. Setups that handle hydrofluoric acid may use a window made of polycarbonate.

=== Liner materials ===
The interior of a fume hood is often subject to damaging chemicals and elevated temperatures, and as such it is often lined with materials resistant to the chemicals and environment it is expected to be subject to. In most cases, only the working surface at the bottom of the enclosed space is made from a liner material, which is most frequently built from epoxy resin or stainless steel, but a fume hood may be lined with any of the following materials:

- Phenolic resin;
- Fiber-reinforced plastic;
- Polypropylene;
- Square-corner stainless steel for durability and heat resistance;
- Coved-corner stainless steel is easier to decontaminate and is preferred for radiochemical and biohazard applications; and
- Cement board for rough usage.

=== Control and monitoring panels ===
Most fume hoods are fitted with a mains-powered control panel and/or air flow-monitoring device. Typically, they will allow for the manual or automatic adjustment of internal baffles, but are required by ANSI and EN standards to provide visual and audible warnings in the following situations:

- Air flow is too high or low
- Too large an opening at the front of the unit (a "high sash" alarm is caused by the sliding glass at the front of the unit being raised higher than is considered safe, due to the resulting air velocity drop)

Some control panels additionally allow for switching mechanisms inside the hood from a central point, such as turning the exhaust fan or an internal light on or off.

== Ducted fume hoods ==
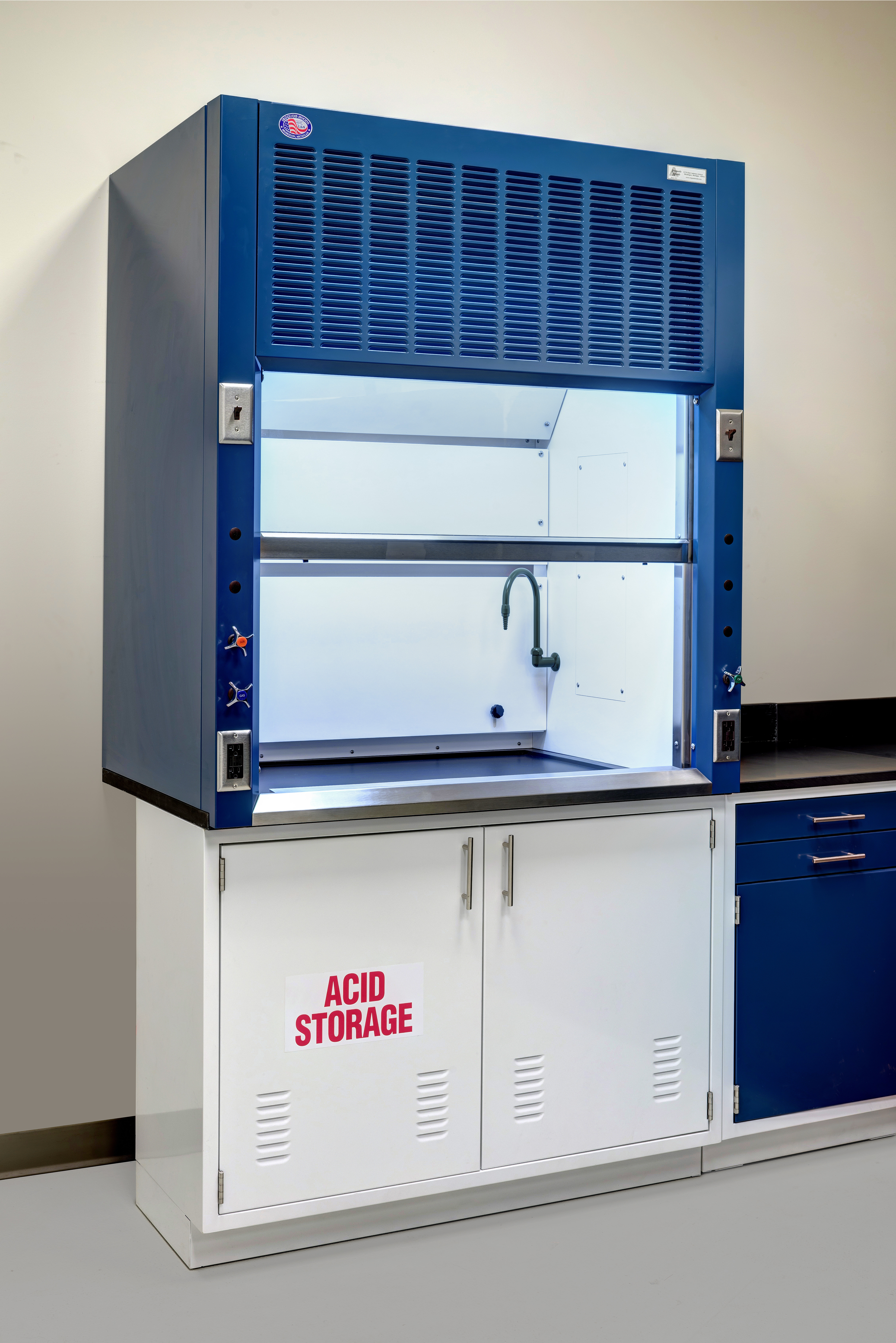
A ducted fume hood positioned above a chemical storage cabinet

Most fume hoods for industrial purposes are ducted. A large variety of ducted fume hoods exist. In most designs, conditioned (i.e. heated or cooled) air is drawn from the lab space into the fume hood and then dispersed via ducts into the outside atmosphere.

To reduce lab ventilation energy costs, variable air volume (VAV) systems are employed, which reduce the volume of the air exhausted as the fume hood sash is closed. This product is often enhanced by an automatic sash closing device, which will close the fume hood sash when the user leaves the fume hood face. The result is that the hoods are operating at the minimum exhaust volume whenever no one is working in front of them.

Since the typical fume hood in US climates uses 3.5 times as much energy as a home, the reduction or minimization of exhaust volume is strategic in reducing facility energy costs as well as minimizing the impact on the facility infrastructure and the environment. Particular attention must be paid to the exhaust discharge location, to reduce risks to public safety, and to avoid drawing exhaust air back into the building air supply system; exhaust requirements of fume hood systems may be regulated to prevent public and worker exposures.

=== Auxiliary air ===
Fume hoods with an auxiliary air supply, which draw air from outside the building rather than drawing conditioned air from the room they are placed in, have been controversial and are often not recommended. They have been considered as an option to save energy in some situations, as they do not draw out conditioned air from a room. In addition to providing a non-conditioned environment inside the hood as compared to outside the hood, which may cause discomfort or irritation to workers, chemical hoods with an auxiliary air supply have been demonstrated to expose workers to materials within the hood at a significantly higher rate than conventional non-air supply hoods.

=== Constant air volume (CAV) ===
Constant air volume (CAV) fume hoods maintain a consistent volume of air within the hood, regardless of the position of the sash window. This results in changes in air velocity depending on the position of the sash; the sash is adjusted to an appropriate working height to achieve adequate face velocity. (Note: Face velocity is the "velocity of air at the face of an air diffuser or air terminal unit.") In a survey of 247 lab professionals conducted in 2010, Lab Manager Magazine found that approximately 43% of fume hoods are CAV fume hoods.

==== Non-bypass CAV ====
The most basic design of a CAV fume hood only has one opening through which air can pass—the sash opening. Closing the sash on a non-bypass CAV hood will increase face velocity (inflow velocity or "pull"), which is a function of the total volume divided by the area of the sash opening. Thus, the hood's performance (from a safety perspective) depends primarily on sash position, with safety increasing as the hood is drawn closed. This design is referred to as a "conventional" hood. Many conventional hoods specify a maximum height that the sash window can be open in order to maintain safe airflow levels.

A major drawback of conventional CAV hoods is that when the sash is closed, velocities can increase to the point where they disturb instrumentation, cool hot plates, slow reactions, and/or create turbulence that can force contaminants into the room.

==== Bypass CAV ====
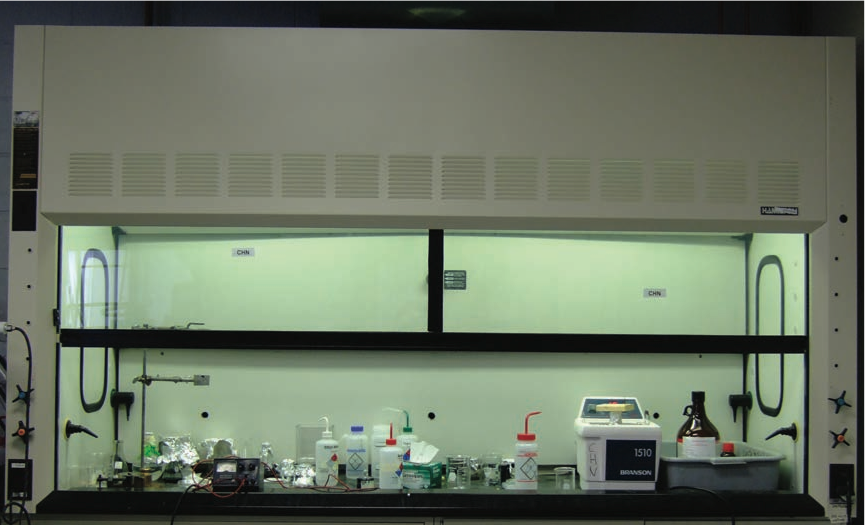
A bypass fume hood. The grille for the bypass chamber is visible at the top.

Bypass CAV hoods were developed to overcome the high velocity issues that affect conventional fume hoods. These hood allows air to be pulled through a "bypass" opening from above as the sash closes. The bypass is located so that as the user closes the sash, the bypass opening gets larger; when the sash is fully closed, air flows only through the airfoil underneath the bottom of the sash window. The air going through the hood maintains a constant volume no matter where the sash is positioned and without changing fan speeds. As a result, the energy consumed by CAV fume hoods (or rather, the energy consumed by the building HVAC system and the energy consumed by the hood's exhaust fan) remains constant, or near constant, regardless of sash position.

===== Low-flow/high-performance bypass CAV =====
High-performance or low-flow bypass CAV hoods are a modern type of bypass CAV hoods and typically display improved containment, safety, and energy conservation features. These hoods include features such as sash stops on the window, automatic baffle control via sash position and airflow sensors, fans to create a barrier of air between the user and the enclosure, and improved aerodynamics to maintain laminar flow. The design of these hoods is intended to allow the unit to meet ASHRAE standards while maintaining a lower face velocity and thus consuming less energy.

=== Variable air volume (VAV) ===
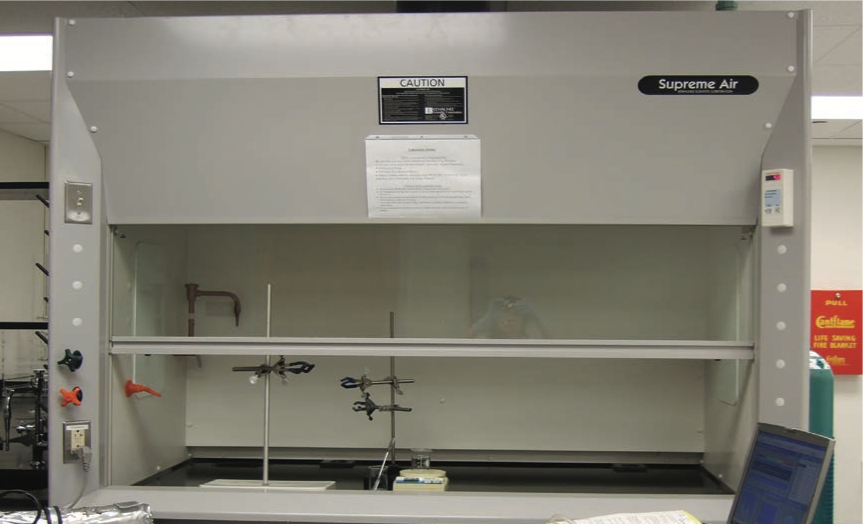
A variable airflow (constant-velocity) fume hood, with a visible flow sensor

VAV hoods, the newest generations of laboratory fume hoods, vary the volume of room air exhausted while maintaining the face velocity at a set level. Different VAV hoods change the exhaust volume using different methods, such as a damper or valve in the exhaust duct that opens and closes based on sash position, or a blower that changes speed to meet air-volume demands. Most VAV hoods integrate a modified bypass system to a conventional fume hood system to achieve a variable exhaust volume in proportion to the opening of the hood's face, though a non-bypass design is also used to further decrease the overall volume of air required for operation.

VAV hoods can provide considerable energy savings by reducing the total volume of conditioned air exhausted from the laboratory. However, these savings are contingent on user behavior: the less the hoods are open (both in terms of height and in terms of time), the greater the energy savings. A laboratory that uses a VAV fume hood with a sash that is kept open only during working hours of the day would save a significant amount on energy costs compared to a laboratory using CAV hoods that are fully open 100% of the time, regardless of sash height.

In a survey of 247 lab professionals conducted in 2010, Lab Manager Magazine found that approximately 12% of fume hoods are VAV fume hoods.

=== Canopy fume hoods ===
Canopy fume hoods, also called exhaust canopies, are similar to the range hoods found over stoves in commercial and some residential kitchens. They have only a canopy, no enclosure, and no sash, and are designed for venting non-toxic materials such as smoke, steam, heat, and odors that are naturally carried upward through convection. Chemical-resistant filtered canopy hoods are manufactured by select vendors, but are not ideal for worker safety, as the fumes they draw in from equipment underneath pass through a worker's breathing zone. They are employed in some situations to provide exhaust for large equipment that would be inconvenient to store or manipulate inside a fume hood enclosure, or generally in a lab bench area where processes that require additional ventilation are performed. In a survey of 247 lab professionals conducted in 2010, Lab Manager Magazine found that approximately 13% of fume hoods are ducted canopy fume hoods.

Canopy fume hoods require the installation of additional ductwork compared to other ducted fume hoods, and often draw a great deal more temperature-controlled air from the surrounding environment than enclosed fume hoods, but are comparatively low maintenance.

== Ductless fume hoods ==
Ductless fume hoods, also known as recirculating or self-contained hoods, are units that do not extract air out of the building or work environment. Rather, air is sucked through the front opening of the hood and through a filter, before passing through the fan mounted on the top (soffit) of the hood or beneath the worktop and being fed back into the workplace. With a ductless fume hood it is essential that the filter medium be able to remove the particular hazardous or noxious material being used. As different filters are required for different materials, recirculating fume hoods should only be used when the specific hazards are known and suited to the type of filter used, and such filters have to be replaced regularly. The materials used inside the hood must also have warning properties to indicate a failure of the filter to capture particulates or vapors, such as odor or taste.The production of recirculating fume hoods was only made possible after the invention of the HEPA filter in the 1940s, and while the units were initially considered inadequate at providing worker protection from vapors, their design and performance have been improved from the 1980s onward.

Air filtration of ductless fume hoods is typically broken into two segments:

- Pre-filtration: This is the first stage of filtration, and consists of a physical barrier, typically open cell foam, which prevents large particles from passing through. Filters of this type are generally inexpensive, and last for approximately six months depending on usage.
- Main filtration: After pre-filtration, the fumes are sucked through a layer of activated charcoal which absorbs the majority of chemicals that pass through it. Ammonia and carbon monoxide will, however, pass through most carbon filters; these filters are more often designed to adsorb volatile organic compounds. Additional specific filtration techniques can be added to combat chemicals that would otherwise be pumped back into the room.

The advantages of using a ductless fume hood include their ease of implementation compared to ducted hoods, and the fact that conditioned air is not removed from the building. These factors alone provide measurable savings in energy usage. The safety and effectiveness of ductless hoods, however, is markedly lower than ducted hoods in all but the most constrained conditions. Ductless fume hoods are not appropriate for research applications where the activity, and the materials used or generated, may change or be unknown. As a result of this and other drawbacks, some research organizations, including the University of Wisconsin, Milwaukee, Columbia University, Princeton University, the University of New Hampshire, and the University of Colorado, Boulder either discourage or prohibit the use of ductless fume hoods. Additionally, while typically not classified as such, the manner in which biosafety cabinets are operated when not connected to a duct system is functionally the same as a ductless fume hood, though the applications of biosafety cabinets, combined with the relative difficulty in connecting them to a building exhaust system compared to a fume hood, result in different safety considerations.

In a survey of 247 lab professionals conducted in 2010, Lab Manager Magazine found that approximately 22% of fume hoods are ductless fume hoods.

== Specialty designs ==
=== Downflow ===
Downflow fume hoods, also called downflow workstations, are fume hoods designed to protect the user and the environment from hazardous vapors generated on the work surface. A downward air flow is generated and hazardous vapors are collected through slits in the work surface. Downflow fume hoods are encountered more frequently in applications involving powders, and are comparable to laminar flow cabinets. The laminar flow within these devices is easily disrupted, more so than traditional fume hoods, which can result in exposure to hazards within the hood.

=== Floor-mounted ===
Also termed "walk-in" fume hoods, floor-mounted fume hoods have a working area that extends from the floor to the bottom of a connected exhaust duct for the use of tall equipment. Despite the name of "walk-in", entering a floor-mounted fume hood in operation while it contains hazardous materials poses a significant risk to the user; they are only intended to be entered for the initial setup of equipment. Floor-mounted hoods are often equipped with multiple sashes, as a single long sash would be abnormally long if positioned for vertical movement, and have swinging doors that allow access to the lower portion of the hood.

=== Radioisotope ===
Fume hoods designed to handle radioactive materials are made with a coved stainless steel liner and coved integral stainless steel countertop that may be lined with lead to protect from gamma rays. Work with radioisotopes, regardless of hood design, is advised to be done over sorbent pads to prevent releases through spills. Regulations may require that any exhausted material is filtered through a regularly replaced HEPA or activated carbon filter to avoid environmental release of radioisotopes.

=== Scrubber ===
Some fume hoods are equipped with scrubber systems designed to absorb particularly hazardous chemical fumes before they are exhausted, whether for environmental or user safety concerns. The scrubber system is stocked with acid or base neutralizing salts to effectively remove the targeted chemical used in any planned procedures; this factor requires a higher level of maintenance than standard fume hoods, and also produces hazardous wastewater.

=== Water-wash ===
Fume hood units designed for procedures involving perchloric acid feature a water-wash system in the ductwork and are often built from marine grade stainless steel or rigid polyvinyl chloride, Because dense perchloric acid fumes settle and form highly reactive perchlorate crystals, the internal baffles of the fume cupboard and ductwork must be cleaned internally with a series of sprayers, and all corners may be altered to be coved or rounded to further reduce the potential for buildup of crystals. A drain is integrated into the design for removal of wastewater solution. This design was first developed by the United States Bureau of Mines in 1964, and is sometimes referred to as an "acid digestion hood".

== Energy consumption ==
Because fume hoods constantly remove large volumes of conditioned (heated or cooled) air from lab spaces, they are responsible for the consumption of large amounts of energy. Fume hoods are a major factor in making laboratories four to five times more energy intensive than typical commercial buildings, and these energy requirements are exacerbated in hot and humid climates. Energy costs for a typical hood can range from $4,600/year in Los Angeles to $9,300/year in Singapore based on differences in cooling needs. The bulk of the energy that fume hoods are responsible for is the energy needed to heat and/or cool air delivered to the lab space. Additional electricity is consumed by fans in the HVAC system and fans in the fume hood exhaust system.

A number of universities run or have run programs to encourage lab users to reduce fume hood energy consumption by keeping VAV sashes closed as much as possible. For example, Harvard University's Chemistry & Chemical Biology Department ran a "Shut the Sash" campaign, which resulted in a sustained ~30% reduction in fume hood exhaust rates. This translated into cost savings of approximately $180,000 per year, and a reduction in annual greenhouse gas emissions equivalent to 300 metric tons of carbon dioxide. Several other institutions report on programs to reduce energy consumption by fume hoods, including:

- Massachusetts Institute of Technology
- North Carolina State University
- University of British Columbia
- University of California, Berkeley
- University of California, Davis
- University of California, Irvine
- University of California, Los Angeles
- University of California, Riverside
- University of California, San Diego
- University of California, Santa Barbara
- University of Central Florida
- University of Colorado Boulder
- University of Chicago

=== Hibernation ===
In 2020, Cornell University sought to reduce energy consumption during times of reduced occupancy (caused by a response to the COVID-19 pandemic) by shutting off airflow to many HVAC systems, including those connected to fume hoods. The process of shutting off, or "hibernating", these fume hoods turned out to be difficult to implement unilaterally across equipment of different models and ages, and only produced significant cost savings when applied over a period of more than 3 months. Process improvements allowed for the development of equipment and programs that can better implement periods of fume hood "hibernation", which have been implemented across several research institutions as of 2024, including the University of Alabama, University of Nebraska–Lincoln, and Massachusetts Institute of Technology.

=== Use of sensors ===
Person detection technology, such as motion detectors and occupancy sensors, can sense the presence of a hood operator within a zone in front of a hood. Sensor signals allow ventilation controls to switch between normal and standby or "setback" modes that consume less energy. Coupled with other space occupancy sensor systems, these technologies can adjust ventilation and lighting use to effectively minimize wasted energy in laboratories. However, there are safety concerns with reducing airflow in fume hoods through sensor signals if the sash is left open; some programs combine the principles of "Shut the Sash" campaigns with variable flow ventilation by using technology to actively remind users to close the sash of a fume hood that is not in use. Comprehensive controls on a laboratory may necessitate the use of a mechanical sash controller module that will automatically close the sash and shut off ventilation in concert with motion sensors. However, even without the use of sensors and mechanical sashes, providing reminders to fume hood users to shut the sash is more effective than doing nothing.

== Construction and installation ==
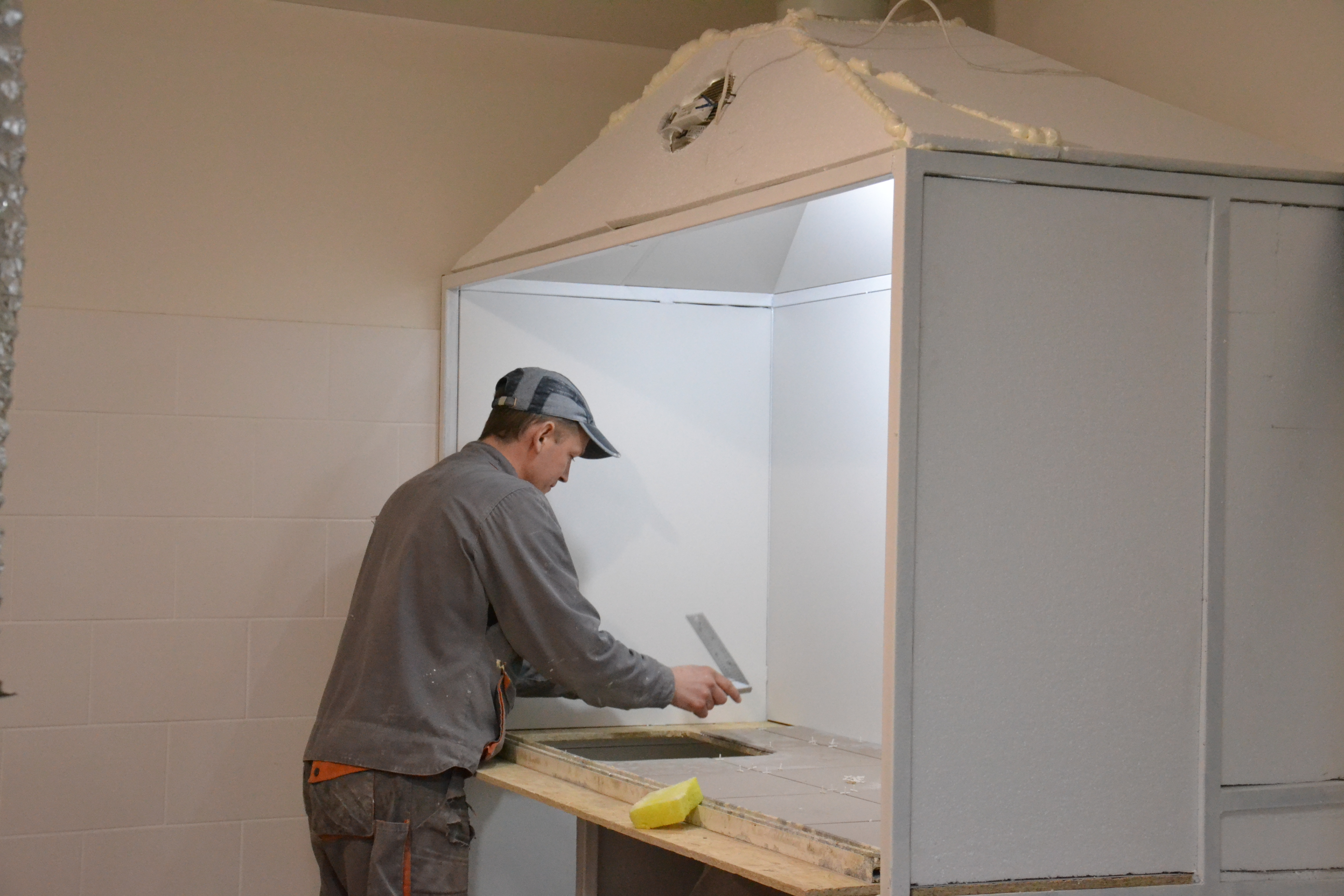
A worker building the frame of a fume hood

Fume hoods are typically constructed with a superstructure encasing the various supporting members and inner lining of the hood. This superstructure is often built out of sheet metal, which has apertures punched into it to allow for access to plumbing and electrical receptacles or devices.

Ducted fume hoods have additional specifications necessitated by their design compared to ductless models. Seams in metal exhaust ductwork must be welded, excluding the outer end where a fan or blower is positioned. Depending on design choices and HVAC capabilities, the blower may be installed within or above the hood, or it may be positioned at the exhaust point, usually the roof of the building.

Fume hoods are installed with the intent to minimize exposure to materials used within the enclosure; as such, they are most often placed against walls and away from doors in order to prevent exposure by eddies in air caused by a door opening or closing. One EN standard requires that the face of a fume hood be installed such that it is at least 1 metre (3.3 ft) from any space where there is frequent movement.

Regional standards may require the implementation of further precautions and design considerations beyond the general requirements to build a functional fume hood. These design standards may advise for considerations previously reserved for specialty hoods that improve aerodynamics and ease of cleaning, such as coved corners, beveled openings, and integrated acid-resistant sinks.

=== Maintenance ===
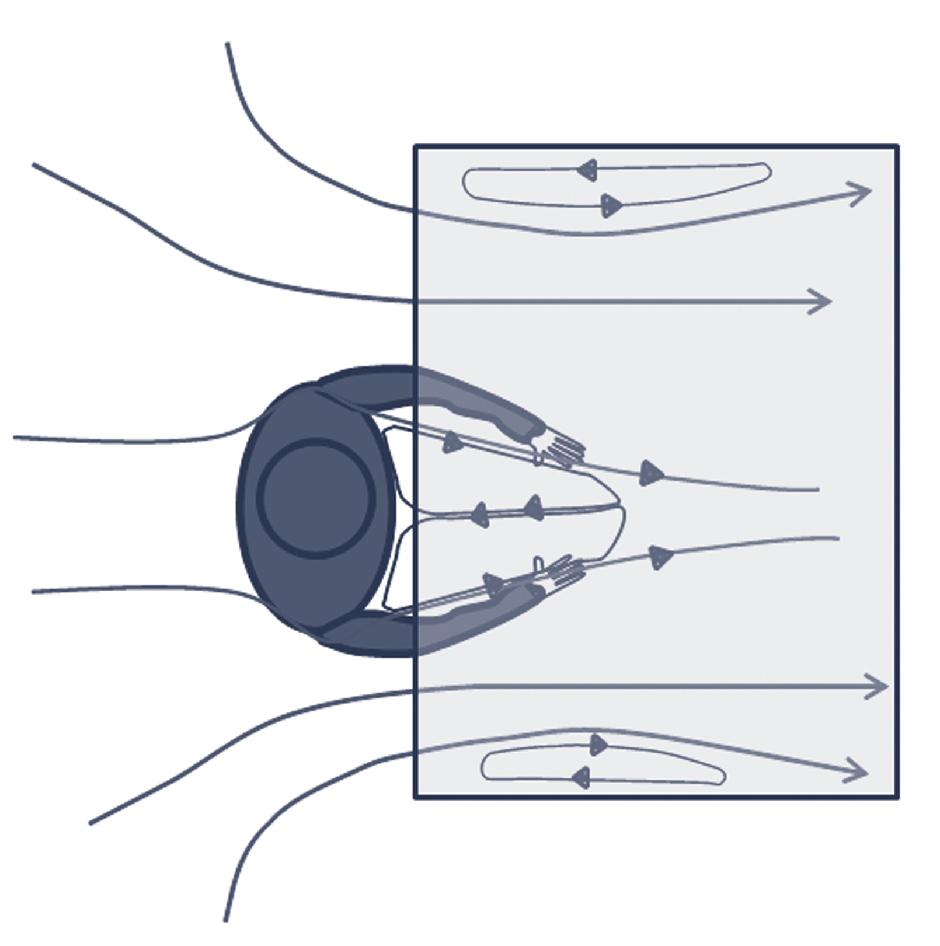
Improper monitoring of fume hood velocity and movements within the enclosure may create a wake that can expose workers to hazardous materials from inside the fume hood.

Fume hoods require regular maintenance to ensure consistent functionality; this is in addition to the standard precautions and measures taken during regular operations and ideally involves daily, periodic, and annual inspections:

- Daily fume hood inspections entail visual inspections of the fume hood for improper storage of material and other visible blockages. Airflow is often monitored for these daily inspections by taping a piece of tissue paper to the open face of the hood such that it will be drawn inward; if the tissue is not pulled inward, the hood exhaust is not functioning.
- Periodic fume hood function inspections require the measurement of capture or face velocity with an anemometer. Specialized instruments for measuring wind speed in a fume hood or in ductwork are often referred to by trade names that indicate the mechanism of measurement, such as "velometer" and "vaneometer". Most fume hoods are commonly recommended to maintain an average face velocity of 80–120 feet (24–37 m) per minute for safe operation. The minimum number of readings used to determine average face velocity varies according to ASHRAE standards, the most recent of which was produced in 2016. Fume hoods and other local exhaust devices may be smoke tested to determine if the contaminants they are designed to remove are being adequately captured and exhausted.Periodic fume hood inspections may also include checks on proper behavior of workers using the device to ensure that they are not exposed to hazardous materials through the actions of the user generating turbulence. Hoods that are not working properly, whether this is identified through an alarm on an airflow monitor or through periodic function tests, are unsafe to use, and in some situations warrant padlocking the sash closed to prevent users from accessing the device to continue work. (Note: "Some individuals have been observed to be so hypnotized by the concept of a hood that they continue to use hoods which are not functioning, still counting on them to provide a normal level of protection. It actually has been necessary on occasion to padlock the sashes of hoods closed to prevent this. Unless a hood is fully functional, it should not be used.")
- Annual maintenance involves mechanical repairs (i.e. lubrication, belt adjustment, filter servicing), maintenance as recommended by the device manufacturer, or upgrades to bring the device into compliance with standards, local building codes, or to meet the specific needs of users. Organizations such as the National Institutes of Health may include wording that requires the retrofitting of already installed fume hoods in updates to their regulatory guidelines. Mechanical changes to ventilation systems or any one fume hood may also affect different devices connected to the system, which can warrant inspection and validation of connected devices after seemingly unrelated work.

== See also ==
- Biosafety cabinet
- Laminar flow cabinet
- Spray booth
- Vented balance safety enclosure
