= Biosecurity =

Preventive measures designed to reduce the risk of infectious disease transmission

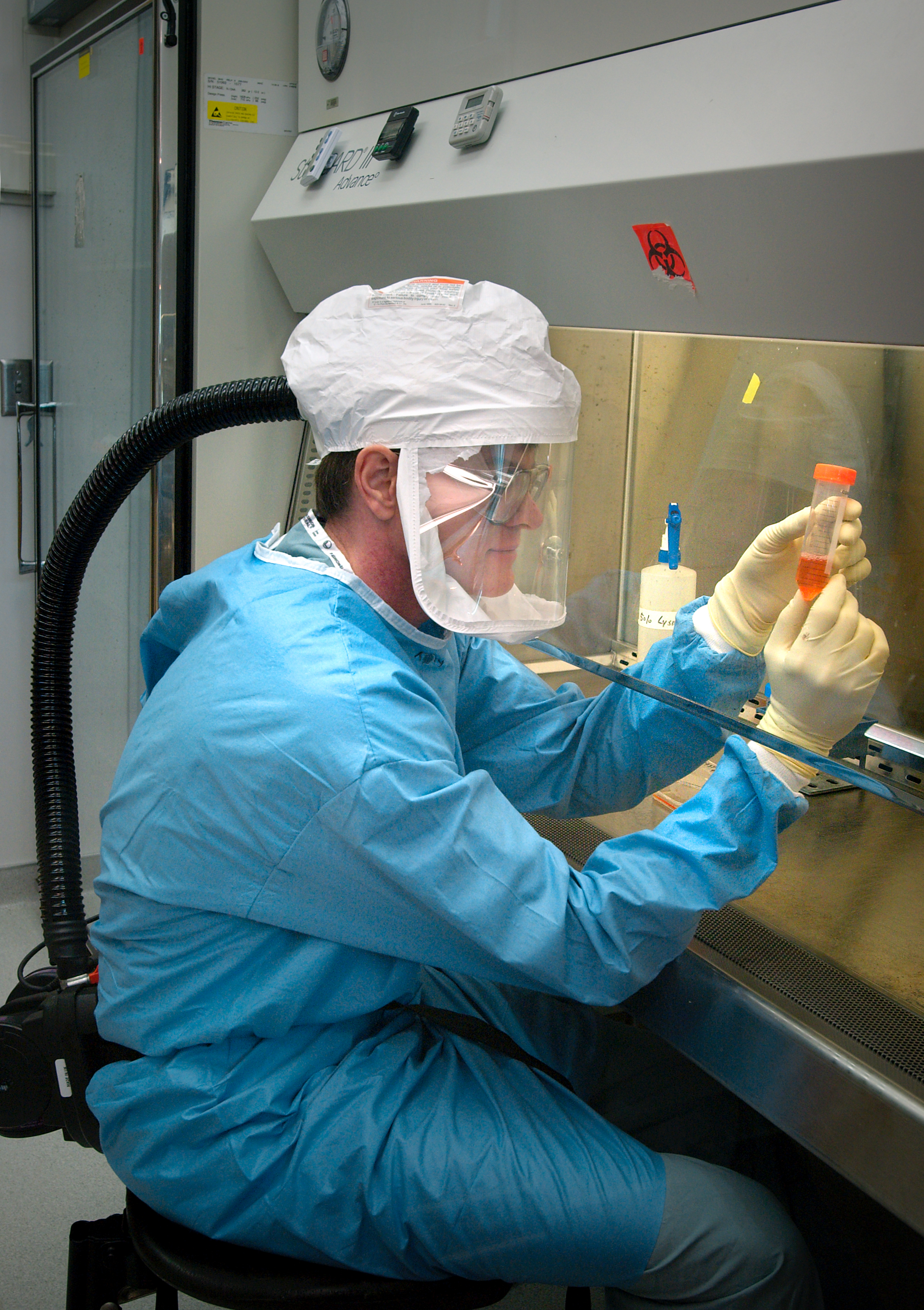
A microbiologist working on the reconstructed virus of the 1918 Spanish flu, using a fume hood for biocontainment.

Biosecurity refers to measures aimed at preventing the introduction or spread of harmful organisms (e.g. viruses, bacteria, plants, animals etc.) intentionally or unintentionally outside their native range or within new environments. In agriculture, these measures are aimed at protecting food crops and livestock from pests, invasive species, and other organisms not conducive to the welfare of the human population. The term includes biological threats to people, including those from pandemic diseases and bioterrorism. The definition has sometimes been broadened to embrace other concepts, and it is used for different purposes in different contexts.

The COVID-19 pandemic is a recent example of a threat for which biosecurity measures have been needed in all countries of the world.

== Background and terminology ==
The term "biosecurity" has been defined differently by various disciplines. The term was first used by the agricultural and environmental communities to describe preventative measures against threats from naturally occurring diseases and pests, later expanded to introduced species. Australia and New Zealand, among other countries, had incorporated this definition within their legislation by 2010. New Zealand was the earliest adopter of a comprehensive approach with its Biosecurity Act 1993. In 2001, the US National Association of State Departments of Agriculture (NASDA) defined biosecurity as "the sum of risk management practices in defense against biological threats", and its main goal as "protect[ing] against the risk posed by disease and organisms".

In 2010, the World Health Organization (WHO) provided an information note describing biosecurity as a strategic and integrated approach to analysing and managing relevant risks to human, animal and plant life and health and associated risks for the environment. In another document, it describes the aim of biosecurity being "to enhance the ability to protect human health, agricultural production systems, and the people and industries that depend on them", with the overarching goal being "to prevent, control and/or manage risks to life and health as appropriate to the particular biosecurity sector".

Measures taken to counter biosecurity risks typically include compulsory terms of quarantine, and are put in place to minimise the risk of invasive pests or diseases arriving at a specific location that could damage crops and livestock as well as the wider environment.

In general, the term is today taken to include managing biological threats to people, industries or environment. These may be from foreign or endemic organisms, but they can also extend to pandemic diseases and the threat of bioterrorism, both of which pose threats to public health.

=== Laboratory biosafety and intentional harm ===
The definition has sometimes been broadened to embrace other concepts, and it is used for different purposes in different contexts. It can be defined as the "successful minimising of the risks that the biological sciences will be deliberately or accidentally misused in a way which causes harm for humans, animals, plants or the environment, including through awareness and understanding of the risks".

From the late 1990s, in response to the threat of biological terrorism, the term started to include the prevention of the theft of biological materials from research laboratories, called "laboratory biosecurity" by WHO. The term laboratory biosafety refers to the measures taken "to reduce the risk of accidental release of or exposure to infectious disease agents", whereas laboratory biosecurity is usually taken to mean "a set of systems and practices employed in legitimate bioscience facilities to reduce the risk that dangerous biological agents will be stolen and used maliciously". Joseph Kanabrocki (2017) source elaborates: "Biosafety focuses on protection of the researcher, their contacts and the environment via accidental release of a pathogen from containment, whether by direct release into the environment or by a laboratory-acquired infection. Conversely, biosecurity focuses on controlling access to pathogens of consequence and on the reliability of the scientists granted this access (thereby reducing the threat of an intentional release of a pathogen) and/or access to sensitive information related to a pathogen's virulence, host-range, transmissibility, resistance to medical countermeasures, and environmental stability, among other things".

In the US, the National Science Advisory Board on Biosecurity was created in 2004 to provide biosecurity oversight of "dual-use research", defined as "biological research with legitimate scientific purpose that may be misused to pose a biological threat to public health and/or national security". In 2006, the National Academy of Sciences defined biosecurity as "security against the inadvertent, inappropriate, or intentional malicious or malevolent use of potentially dangerous biological agents or biotechnology, including the development, production, stockpiling, or use of biological weapons as well as outbreaks of newly emergent and epidemic disease".

A number of nations have developed biological weapons for military use, and many civilian research projects in medicine have the potential to be used in military applications (dual-use research), so biosecurity protocols are used to prevent dangerous biological materials from falling into the hands of malevolent parties.

=== Laboratory program ===
Components of a laboratory biosecurity program include:

- Physical security
- Personnel security
- Material control and accountability
- Transport security
- Information security
- Program management
- Biological Security

== Animals and plants ==
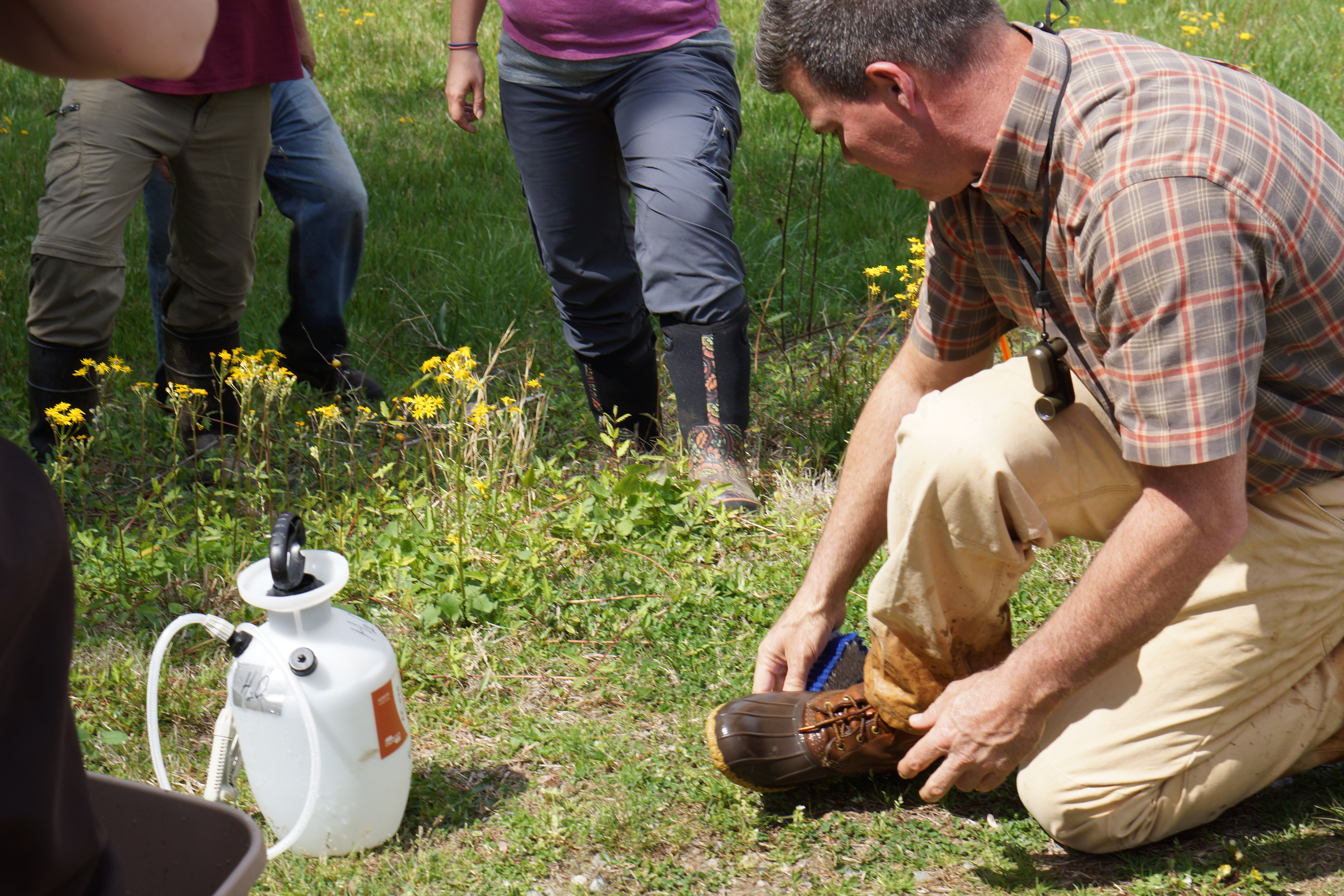
A biologist washing his boots to avoid contaminating a site with invasive species

Threats to animals and plants, in particular food crops, which may in turn threaten human health, are typically overseen by a government department of agriculture.

Animal biosecurity encompasses different means of prevention and containment of disease agents in a specific area. A critical element in animal biosecurity is biocontainment – the control of disease agents already present in a particular area and work to prevent transmission. Animal biosecurity may protect organisms from infectious agents or noninfectious agents such as toxins or pollutants, and can be executed in areas as large as a nation or as small as a local farm.

Animal biosecurity takes into account the epidemiological triad for disease occurrence: the individual host, the disease, and the environment in contributing to disease susceptibility. It aims to improve nonspecific immunity of the host to resist the introduction of an agent, or limit the risk that an agent will be sustained in an environment at adequate levels. Biocontainment works to improve specific immunity towards already present pathogens.

The aquaculture industry is also vulnerable to pathogenic organisms, including fungal, bacterial, or viral infections which can affect fish at different stages of their life cycle.

== Human health ==
Direct threats to human health may come in the form of epidemics or pandemics, such as the 1918 Spanish flu pandemic and other influenza epidemics, MERS, SARS, or the COVID-19 pandemic, or they may be deliberate attacks (bioterrorism). The country/federal and/or state health departments are usually responsible for managing the control of outbreaks and transmission and the supply of information to the public.

=== Medical countermeasures ===
Medical countermeasures (MCMs) are products such as biologics and pharmaceutical drugs that can protect from or treat the effects of a chemical, biological, radiological, or nuclear (CBRN) attack or in the case of public health emergencies. MCMs can also be used for prevention and diagnosis of symptoms associated with CBRN attacks or threats.

In the US, the Food and Drug Administration (FDA) runs a program called the "FDA Medical Countermeasures Initiative" (MCMi), with programs funded by the federal government. It helps support "partner" agencies and organisations prepare for public health emergencies that could require MCMs.

== International agreements and guidelines ==
=== Agricultural biosecurity and human health ===
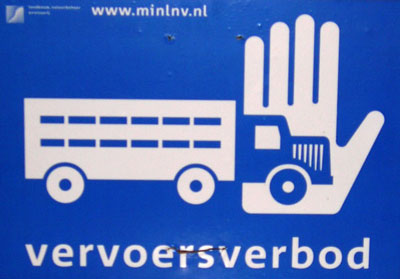
Biosecurity sign for use on a farm or agricultural area experiencing swine fever (Dutch example)

Various international organisations, international bodies and legal instruments and agreements make up a worldwide governance framework for biosecurity.

Standard-setting organisations include the Codex Alimentarius Commission (CAC), the World Organisation for Animal Health (OIE) and the Commission on Phytosanitary Measures (CPM) develop standards pertinent to their focuses, which then become international reference points through the World Trade Organization (WTO)'s Agreement on the Application of Sanitary and Phytosanitary Measures (SPS Agreement), created in 1995. This agreement requires all members of the WTO to consider all import requests concerning agricultural products from other countries. Broadly, the measures covered by the agreement are those aimed at the protection of human, animal or plant life or health from certain risks.

Other important global and regional agreements include the International Health Regulations (IHR, 2005), the International Plant Protection Convention (IPPC), the Cartagena Protocol on Biosafety, the Codex Alimentarius, the Convention on Biological Diversity (CBD) and the General Agreement on Tariffs and Trade (GATT, 1947).

The UN Food and Agriculture Organization (FAO), the International Maritime Organization (IMO), the Organisation for Economic Co-operation and Development (OECD) and WHO are the most important organisations associated with biosecurity.

The IHR is a legally binding agreement on 196 nations, including all member states of WHO. Its purpose and scope is "to prevent, protect against, control, and provide a public health response to the international spread of disease in ways that are commensurate with and restricted to public health risks and that avoid unnecessary interference with international traffic and trade", "to help the international community prevent and respond to acute public health risks that have the potential to cross borders and threaten people worldwide".

=== Biological weapons ===
- The Biological Weapons Convention was the first multilateral disarmament treaty banning the production of an entire category of weapons, being biological weapons.
- UN Resolution 1540 (2004) "affirms that the proliferation of nuclear, chemical and biological weapons and their means of delivery constitutes a threat to international peace and security. The resolution obliges States, inter alia, to refrain from supporting by any means non-State actors from developing, acquiring, manufacturing, possessing, transporting, transferring or using nuclear, chemical or biological weapons and their means of delivery". Resolution 2325, reaffirming 1540, was adopted unanimously on 15 December 2016.

=== Laboratory safety ===
- OECD Best Practice Guidelines for Biological Resource Centres, a consensus report created in 2001 after experts from OECD countries came together, calling upon "national governments to undertake actions to bring the BRC concept into being in concert with the international scientific community". BRCs are "repositories and providers of high-quality biological materials and information".

== As international security issue ==
For a long time, health security or biosecurity issues were not considered as an international security issue, especially in the traditional view of international relations. However, some changes in trend have contributed to the inclusion of biosecurity (health security) in discussions of security. As time progressed, there was a movement towards securitisation. Non-traditional security issues such as climate change, organised crime, terrorism, and landmines came to be included in the definition of international security. There was a general realisation that the actors in the international system not only involved nation-states but also included international organisations, institutions, and individuals, which ensured the security of various actors within each nation became an important agenda. Biosecurity is one of the issues to be securitised under this trend. On 10 January 2000, the UN Security Council convened to discuss HIV/AIDS as a security issue in Africa and designated it a threat in the following month. The UNDP Millennium Development Goals also recognise health issues as international security issue.

Several instances of epidemics such as SARS increased awareness of health security (biosecurity). Several factors have rendered biosecurity issues more severe: there is a continuing advancement of biotechnology, which increases the possibility for malevolent use, evolution of infectious diseases, and globalising force which is making the world more interdependent and more susceptible to spread of epidemics.

Controversial experiments in synthetic biology, including the synthesis of poliovirus from its genetic sequence, and the modification of flu type H5N1 for airborne transmission in mammals, led to calls for tighter controls on the materials and information used to perform similar feats. Ideas include better enforcement by national governments and private entities concerning shipments and downloads of such materials, and registration or background check requirements for anyone handling such materials.

== Challenges ==
Diseases caused by emerging viruses are a major threat to global public health. The proliferation of high biosafety level laboratories around the world has resulted in concern about the availability of targets for those that might be interested in stealing dangerous pathogens. The growth in containment laboratories is often in response to emerging diseases, and many new containment labs' main focus is to find ways to control these diseases. By strengthening national disease surveillance, prevention, control and response systems, the labs have improved international public health.

One of the major challenges of biosecurity is that harmful technology has become more available and accessible. Biomedical advances and the globalisation of scientific and technical expertise have made it possible to greatly improve public health; however, there is also the risk that these advances can make it easier for terrorists to produce biological weapons.

Communication between the citizen and law enforcement officials is important. Indicators of agro-terrorism at a food processing plant may include persons taking notes or photos of a business, theft of employee uniforms, employees changing working hours, or persons attempting to gain information about security measures and personnel. Unusual activity is best handled if reported to law enforcement personnel promptly. Communication between policymakers and life sciences scientists is also important.

The MENA (Middle East and North Africa) region, with its socio-political unrest, diverse cultures and societies, and recent biological weapons programs, faces particular challenges.

=== Future ===
Biosecurity requires the cooperation of scientists, technicians, policy makers, security engineers, and law enforcement officials.

The emerging nature of newer biosecurity threats means that small-scale risks can blow up rapidly, which makes the development of an effective policy challenging owing to the limitations on time and resources available for analysing threats and estimating the likelihood of their occurrence. It is likely that further synergies with other disciplines, such as virology or the detection of chemical contaminants, will develop over time.

Some uncertainties about the policy implementation for biosecurity remain for future. In order to carefully plan out preventive policies, policy makers need to be able to somewhat predict the probability and assess the risks; however, as the uncertain nature of the biosecurity issue goes it is largely difficult to predict and also involves a complex process as it requires a multidisciplinary approach. The policy choices they make to address an immediate threat could pose another threat in the future, facing an unintended trade-off.

Philosopher Toby Ord, in his 2020 book The Precipice: Existential Risk and the Future of Humanity, puts into question whether the current international conventions regarding biotechnology research and development regulation, and self-regulation by biotechnology companies and the scientific community are adequate.

American scientists have proposed various policy-based measures to reduce the large risks from life sciences research – such as pandemics through accident or misapplication. Risk management measures may include novel international guidelines, effective oversight, improvement of US policies to influence policies globally, and identification of gaps in biosecurity policies along with potential approaches to address them.

Researchers have also warned in 2024 of potential risks from mirror life, a hypothetical form of life whose molecular building blocks have inverted chirality. If mirror bacteria were synthesized, they may be able to evade immune systems and spread in the environment without natural predators. They noted that the technology to create mirror bacteria was still probably more than a decade away, but called for a ban on research aiming to create them.

=== Role of education ===
The advance of the life sciences and biotechnology has the potential to bring great benefits to humankind through responding to societal challenges. However, it is also possible that such advances could be exploited for hostile purposes, something evidenced in a small number of incidents of bioterrorism, particularly by the series of large-scale offensive biological warfare programs carried out by major states in the last century. Dealing with this challenge, which has been labelled the "dual-use dilemma", requires a number of different activities. However, one way of ensuring that the life sciences continue to generate significant benefits and do not become subject to misuse for hostile purposes is a process of engagement between scientists and the security community, and the development of strong ethical and normative frameworks to complement legal and regulatory measures that are developed by states.

== See also ==
- Biodefence
- Biological Weapons Convention
- Biorisk
- Biosecurity in Australia
- Biosecurity in New Zealand
- Biosecurity in the United States
- Biowar
- Cyberbiosecurity
- Food safety
- Global health
- Global Health Security Initiative (GHSI)
- Good Agricultural Practices
- Human security
- International Health Regulations
- Interplanetary contamination
- Public health
- Quarantine
- Select agent
