= Biorisk =

Risk associated with biological materials and/or infectious agents ("pathogens")

Biorisk generally refers to the risk associated with biological materials and/or infectious agents, also known as pathogens. The term has been used frequently for various purposes since the early 1990s. The term is used by regulators, security experts, laboratory personnel and industry alike, and is used by the World Health Organization (WHO). WHO/Europe also provides tools and training courses in biosafety and biosecurity.

An international Laboratory Biorisk Management Standard developed under the auspices of the European Committee for Standardization, defines biorisk as the combination of the probability of occurrence of harm and the severity of that harm where the source of harm is a biological agent or toxin. The source of harm may be an unintentional exposure, accidental release or loss, theft, misuse, diversion, unauthorized access or intentional unauthorized release.

== Biorisk reduction ==
Biorisk reduction involves creating expertise in managing high-consequence pathogens, by providing training on safe handling and control of pathogens that pose significant health risks.

== See also ==
- Biocontainment, related to laboratory biosafety levels
- Biodefense
- Biodiversity
- Biohazard
- Biological warfare
- Biological Weapons Convention
- Biosecurity
- Bioterrorism
- Cyberbiosecurity
- Endangered species
