= Cyberbiosecurity =

Emerging field of computer security

Cyberbiosecurity is an emerging field at the intersection of cybersecurity and biosecurity. The objective of cyberbiosecurity has been described as addressing "the potential for or actual malicious destruction, misuse, or exploitation of valuable information, processes, and material at the interface of the life sciences and digital worlds". Cyberbiosecurity is part of a system of measures that collectively aim to "Safeguard the Bioeconomy", an objective described by the National Academies of Sciences, Engineering and Medicine of the United States.

== Cyberbiosecurity threats ==
Cyberbiosecurity threats are becoming increasingly important as technological progress continues to accelerate in fields such as artificial intelligence, automation, and synthetic biology. Moreover, not only is the pace of progress in these fields accelerating, but they are also becoming increasingly integrated, leading to a growing overlap that is generating new security vulnerabilities. Many of the potential risks from future progress in bioengineering that were identified by researchers fall within the bounds of cyberbiosecurity, for instance, the use of cyberattacks to exploit bio-automation for malicious purposes. Against this background, cyberbiosecurity measures are becoming increasingly important to prevent or protect against the misuse of innovations in the life sciences, including to reduce the proliferation risk of biological weapons. In recent years, there has been a growing amount of research characterizing cyberbiosecurity threats, including by conducting surveys on cyberbiosecurity risk perceptions in the biotech sector, and offering first recommendations for measures to prevent or protect against these threats. Researchers have observed that in the future it may be critical to consider the risk of computer systems being exploited by adversarially created DNA.

In light of the COVID-19 pandemic, some research has focused on the cyberbiosecurity implications of the pandemic.

== Cyberbiosecurity in Water and Agriculture Systems ==
Intelligent Water Systems are a critical component of modern infrastructure, underpinning municipal water treatment, distribution, and irrigation through SCADA networks, advanced metering infrastructure, cloud-connected sensor arrays, and automated control platforms. Agriculture itself is effected as an activity dependent on water security, while having unique cyberbiosecurity risks independent of water. Malicious actors have attacked these, as well as other critical infrastructure systems as they've grown to rely on advanced technologies. Countermeasures have focused on developing anomaly detection techniques in order to prevent damages that could affect end-users.
