= Division of Select Agents and Toxins =

The Division of Select Agents and Toxins (DSAT) of the Centers for Disease Control and Prevention is responsible for the Select Agent Program and the Etiologic Agent Import Permit Program. They inspect the laboratories of more than 300 organizations approved to use and transfer select agents, and put regulations in place to minimize risk in the use of these bacterial agents and toxins.

DSAT investigates incidents related to the laboratory use of select agents and toxins and refers cases to the FBI and HHS Office of Inspector General when necessary.

They also review experiments that are deemed "restricted experiments" because of their increased risk.

Samuel S. Edwin became the director of the division in 2016. The office's 2016 budget was approximately $21.5 million.
