= Biocontainment =

Physical containment of pathogenic organisms or agents in microbiology laboratories

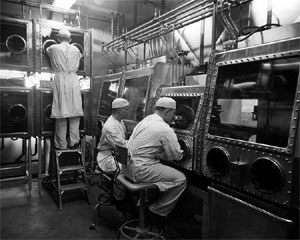
Researchers working in Class III cabinets at the U.S. Army Biological Warfare Laboratories, Camp Detrick, Maryland (1940s). Biocontainment procedures were pioneered at the USBWL in the 1940s and '50s.

One use of the concept of biocontainment is related to laboratory biosafety and pertains to microbiology laboratories in which the physical containment of pathogenic organisms or agents (bacteria, viruses, and toxins) is required, usually by isolation in environmentally and biologically secure cabinets or rooms, to prevent accidental infection of workers or release into the surrounding community during scientific research.

Another use of the term relates to facilities for the study of agricultural pathogens, where it is used similarly to the term "biosafety", relating to safety practices and procedures used to prevent unintended infection of plants or animals or the release of high-consequence pathogenic agents into the environment (air, soil, or water).

== Terminology ==
The World Health Organization's 2006 publication, Biorisk management: Laboratory biosecurity guidance, defines laboratory biosafety as "the containment principles, technologies and practices that are implemented to prevent the unintentional exposure to pathogens and toxins, or their accidental release". It defines biorisk management as "the analysis of ways and development of strategies to minimize the likelihood of the occurrence of biorisks".

The term "biocontainment" is related to laboratory biosafety. Merriam-Webster's online dictionary reports the first use of the term in 1966, defined as "the containment of extremely pathogenic organisms (such as viruses) usually by isolation in secure facilities to prevent their accidental release especially during research".

The term laboratory biosafety refers to the measures taken "to reduce the risk of accidental release of or exposure to infectious disease agents", whereas laboratory biosecurity is usually taken to mean "a set of systems and practices employed in legitimate bioscience facilities to reduce the risk that dangerous biological agents will be stolen and used maliciously".

== Containment types ==
=== Laboratory context ===
Primary containment is the first container in direct contact with biohazardous material as well as protection of personnel and the immediate laboratory environment from exposure to infectious agents. Primary containment requires using proper storage containers, good microbiological technique, and the use of appropriate safety equipment such as biological safety cabinets.

Secondary containment is the protection of the environment external to the laboratory from exposure to infectious materials and is provided by a combination of facility design and operational practices.

Biological safety cabinets (BSC), first commercially available in 1950, are fairly common devices designed to provide effective primary biocontainment in laboratories working with highly infectious agents. Three general levels and types have been devised (Class I, Class II, and Class III).

Biosafety suites are suites of laboratory rooms which are essentially equivalent to large Class III cabinets in which positive pressure personnel suits ("space suits") serve as the "outside" environment for workers. Examples include the biosafety suites at USAMRIID at Fort Detrick, Maryland, USA and the Maximum Containment Facility (MCF) of the CDC in Atlanta, Georgia, USA.

=== Agricultural context ===
The term “biocontainment” is used differently in facilities for the study of human pathogens versus those used for the study of agricultural pathogens. In agricultural facilities, the definition for “biocontainment” resembles that for “biosafety,” i.e., the safety practices and procedures used to prevent unintended infection of plants or animals or the release of high-consequence pathogenic agents into the environment (air, soil, or water). In the agricultural setting, worker protection and public health are always considerations; however, emphasis is placed on reducing the risk that agents under study could escape into the environment.

== Biosafety levels ==
A "biosafety level" (BSL) is the level of the biocontainment precautions required to isolate dangerous biological agents in an enclosed laboratory facility. The levels of containment range from the lowest biosafety level 1 (BSL-1) to the highest at level 4 (BSL-4). In the United States, the Centers for Disease Control and Prevention (CDC) have specified these levels. In the European Union, the same biosafety levels are defined in a directive.

== Guidelines ==
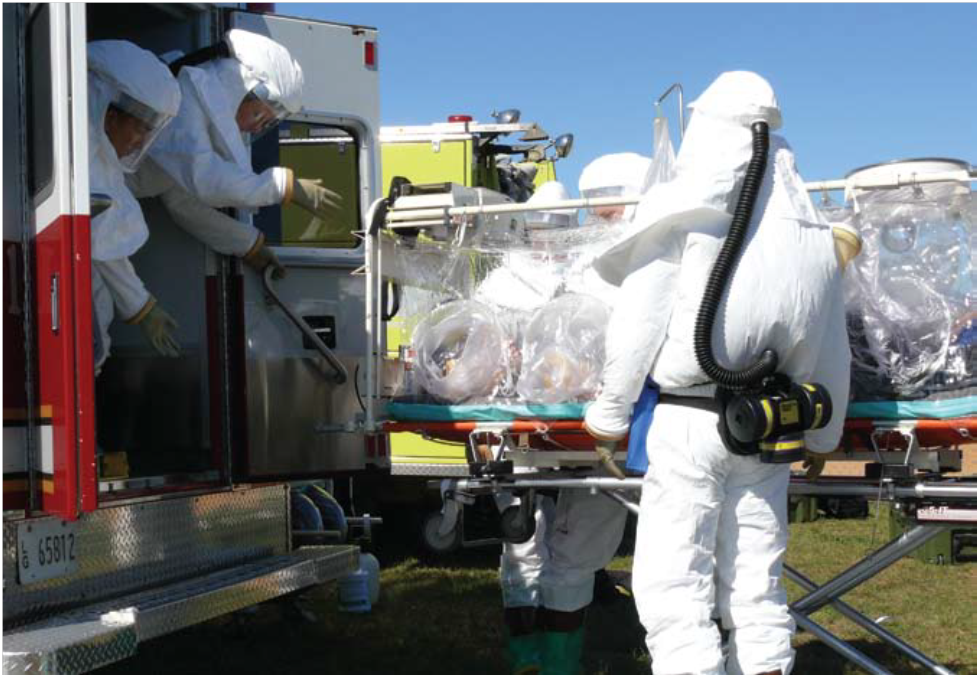
The Aeromedical Isolation Team (AIT) of the U.S. Army operated mobile biocontainment equipment designed for patient care and transport from 1978 to 2010. (Photo by Bruce Maston, 2007)

Today, guiding publications for biosafety and containment in the US are set by the Centers for Disease Control and Prevention (CDC) and the National Institutes of Health (NIH). Since 1984, the CDC and the NIH have jointly authored the Biosafety in Microbiological and Medical Laboratories (BMBL). The BMBL is an advisory document providing national recommendations for Biosafety Levels, Containment, Decontamination and Disinfection, Transportation, and Disposal of biohazardous agents.

In Canada the government publication "Laboratory biosafety guidelines" was current between 1990 and 2013, and has been superseded by the "Canadian Biosafety Standards and Guidelines".

OECD Best Practice Guidelines for Biological Resource Centres is a consensus report created in 2001 after experts from OECD countries came together, calling upon "national governments to undertake actions to bring the BRC concept into being in concert with the international scientific community". BRCs are "repositories and providers of high-quality biological materials and information".

== Laboratory program ==
Components of a laboratory biosecurity program include:

- Physical security
- Personnel security
- Material control and accountability
- Transport security
- Information security
- Program management

== See also ==
- Aeromedical Isolation Team – Former US Army aeromobile biocontainment team
- Biorisk – Risk associated with biological materials and/or infectious agents ("pathogens")
- Biosafety – Prevention of large-scale loss of biological integrity
- Biosafety level – Set of biocontainment precautions
- Biosecurity – Preventive measures designed to reduce the risk of infectious disease transmission
- Biological hazard – Biological material that poses serious risks to the health of living organisms
- Chemical hazard – Non-biological hazards of hazardous materials
- Safety engineering – Engineering discipline
- Security engineering – Process of incorporating security controls into an information system
- Select agent – Controlled biological agents in the United States
