= Select agent =

Controlled biological agents in the United States

Under United States law, biological select agents or toxins (BSATs)—or simply select agents for short—are bio-agents which (since 1997) have been declared by the United States Department of Health and Human Services (HHS) or by the United States Department of Agriculture (USDA) to have the "potential to pose a severe threat to public health and safety". The agents are divided into (1) HHS select agents and toxins affecting humans; (2) USDA select agents and toxins affecting agriculture; and (3) overlap select agents and toxins affecting both.

== Regulation ==
The Centers for Disease Control and Prevention (CDC) have regulated the laboratories which may possess, use, or transfer select agents within the United States under the Select Agent Program (SAP) since 2001. The SAP was established to satisfy requirements of the Patriot Act of 2001 and the Public Health Security and Bioterrorism Preparedness and Response Act of 2002, which were enacted in the wake of the September 11 attacks and the subsequent 2001 anthrax attacks.

Using select agents in biomedical research prompts concerns about dual use. The federal government created the National Science Advisory Board for Biosecurity to promote biosecurity in life science research. It is composed of government, education and industry experts who provide policy recommendations on ways to minimize the possibility that knowledge and technologies emanating from biological research will be misused to threaten public health or national security.

== Violations ==
In July 2015, Gregory E. Demske, chief counsel to the inspector general in the HHS Office of Inspector General (OIG), testified that 30 civil violations of the SAP rules had been identified in the past 13 years, and that violators had paid about $2.4 million in fines by. He explained that when the CDC's Division of Select Agents and Toxins detects possible SAP misconduct by an HHS worker, it coordinates with the OIG to gather facts. If it concludes that a civil violation might have occurred, it turns the case over to the OIG for possible enforcement. But if it suspects a crime, it pursues the matter with the FBI. Since passage of the Bioterrorism Act of 2002, the OIG had received 68 referrals from the CDC for possible Select Agent enforcement and found violations in 30 of those cases. Notices of violation were sent to 5 federal entities, 3 universities, and 2 other private organizations, all unnamed in his testimony. Demske remarked that no federal agencies had been fined for SAP violations.

== List of select agents ==
Tier 1 BSATs are indicated by an asterisk (*).

=== HHS select agents and toxins ===
==== Bacteria ====
- Botulinum neurotoxin-producing species of Clostridium*
- Coxiella burnetii
- Burkholderia mallei* (formerly Pseudomonas mallei)
- Burkholderia pseudomallei* (formerly Pseudomonas pseudomallei)
- Francisella tularensis*
- Rickettsia prowazekii
- Rickettsia rickettsii
- Yersinia pestis*
- Bacillus anthracis

==== Viruses ====
- Coronavirus:
  - SARS-associated coronavirus (SARS-CoV)
- Encephalitis viruses:
  - Eastern equine encephalitis virus (excluding South American genotypes)
  - Tick-borne encephalitis-complex viruses (3 subtypes, excluding European ones)
    - Central European tick-borne encephalitis virus
    - Far-Eastern tick-borne encephalitis virus
    - Russian spring and summer encephalitis virus
- Influenza viruses:
  - Highly Pathogenic Avian Influenza H5N1 virus (exempt from 2024-2027)
  - Reconstructed 1918 influenza virus
- Orthopoxviruses:
  - Monkeypox virus Clade I
  - Variola major virus* (smallpox virus)
  - Variola minor virus* (Alastrim)
- Viral hemorrhagic fever (VHF) viruses:
  - African VHF viruses:
    - Crimean–Congo hemorrhagic fever virus
    - Ebola virus*
    - Lassa fever virus
    - Lujo virus
    - Marburg virus*
  - Asian VHF viruses:
    - Kyasanur Forest disease virus
    - Omsk hemorrhagic fever virus
  - South American VHF viruses:
    - Chapare virus
    - Guanarito virus (Venezuelan hemorrhagic fever)
    - Junin virus (Argentine hemorrhagic fever)
    - Machupo (Bolivian hemorrhagic fever)
    - Sabiá virus (Brazilian hemorrhagic fever)

==== Toxins ====
As of April 2025 these biological agents and toxins are considered to "have the potential to pose a severe threat to both human and animal health, to plant health, or to animal and plant products".

- Abrin
- Botulinum neurotoxins*
- Conotoxins
- Ricin
- Saxitoxin
- Staphylococcal enterotoxins
- Tetrodotoxin
- 2 Type A trichothecenes:
  - Diacetoxyscirpenol
  - T-2 toxin

=== Overlap select agents and toxins ===
==== Bacteria ====
- Bacillus anthracis*
- Burkholderia mallei* (formerly Pseudomonas mallei)
- Burkholderia pseudomallei* (formerly Pseudomonas pseudomallei)

==== Viruses ====
- Hendra virus
- Nipah virus*
- Rift Valley fever virus
- Venezuelan equine encephalitis virus (excluding enzootic subtypes ID and IE)

=== USDA select agents and toxins ===
==== For animals ====
===== Bacteria =====
- Mycoplasma mycoides subspecies mycoides small colony (Mmm SC) (contagious bovine pleuropneumonia)
- Mycoplasma capricolum subspecies capripneumoniae (contagious caprine pleuropneumonia)

===== Viruses =====
- African swine fever virus
- Avian influenza virus (highly pathogenic)
- Classical swine fever virus
- Foot-and-mouth disease virus*
- Goat Pox virus
- Lumpy skin disease virus
- Peste des petits ruminants virus
- Rinderpest virus*
- Sheep Pox virus
- Swine vesicular disease virus
- Virulent Newcastle disease virus 1

==== For plants ====
===== Bacteria =====
- Ralstonia solanacearum race 3, biovar 2
- Rathayibacter toxicus
- Xanthomonas oryzae

===== Fungi or fungus-like pathogens =====
- Coniothyrium glycines (formerly Phoma glycinicola and Pyrenochaeta glycines)
- Sclerophthora rayssiae var zeae
- Synchytrium endobioticum

== List of former select agents ==
Select agent regulations were revised in October 2012 to remove 19 BSATs from the list (7 Human and Overlap Agents and 12 Animal Agents).

=== Human and overlap agents ===
- Brucella abortus
- Brucella melitensis
- Brucella suis
- Cercopithecine herpesvirus 1 (Herpes B virus)
- Clostridium perfringens epsilon toxin
- Coccidioides posadasii
- Coccidioides immitis
- Eastern equine encephalitis virus, South American genotypes
- Flexal virus
- Tick-borne encephalitis viruses, European subtypes
- Venezuelan equine encephalitis virus, enzootic subtypes ID and IE

=== Animal agents ===
- African horse sickness virus
- Akabane virus
- Bluetongue virus
- Bovine spongiform encephalitis
- Camel Pox virus
- Erlichia ruminantium
- Japanese encephalitis virus
- Malignant Catarrhal Fever virus (Alcelaphine herpesvirus type 1)
- Menangle virus
- Vesicular stomatitis virus (exotic): Indiana subtypes VSV-IN2, VSV-IN3

=== Plant agents ===
- Peronosclerospora philippinensis (Peronosclerospora sacchari)
- Xylella fastidiosa pauca (citrus variegated chlorosis strain)

== See also ==
- Biological agent
- Biosecurity in the United States
- U.S. biological defense program
