= Health and safety hazards of nanomaterials =

The health and safety hazards of nanomaterials include the potential toxicity of various types of nanomaterials, as well as fire and dust explosion hazards. Because nanotechnology is a recent development, the health and safety effects of exposures to nanomaterials, and what levels of exposure may be acceptable, are subjects of ongoing research. Of the possible hazards, inhalation exposure appears to present the most concern, with animal studies showing pulmonary effects such as inflammation, fibrosis, and carcinogenicity for some nanomaterials. Skin contact and ingestion exposure, and dust explosion hazards, are also a concern.

Guidance has been developed for hazard controls that are effective in reducing exposures to safe levels, including substitution with safer forms of a nanomaterial, engineering controls such as proper ventilation, and personal protective equipment as a last resort. For some materials, occupational exposure limits have been developed to determine a maximum safe airborne concentration of nanomaterials, and exposure assessment is possible using standard industrial hygiene sampling methods. An ongoing occupational health surveillance program can also help to protect workers. Microplastics and nanoparticles from plastic containers are an increasing concern.

== Background ==
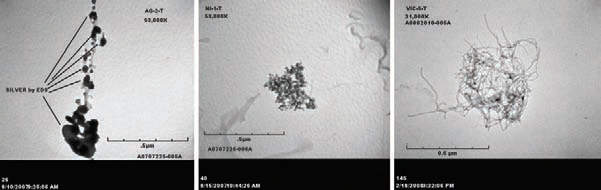
Optical micrographs of several nanomaterials present in aerosol particles. From left, silver nanoparticles, nickel nanoparticles, and multiwalled carbon nanotubes

Nanotechnology is the manipulation of matter at the atomic scale to create materials, devices, or systems with new properties or functions, with potential applications in energy, healthcare, industry, communications, agriculture, consumer products, and other sectors. Nanomaterials have at least one primary dimension of less than 100 nanometers, and often have properties different from those of their bulk components that are technologically useful. The classes of materials of which nanoparticles are typically composed include elemental carbon, metals or metal oxides, and ceramics. According to the Woodrow Wilson Center, the number of consumer products or product lines that incorporate nanomaterials increased from 212 to 1317 from 2006 to 2011. Worldwide investment in nanotechnology increased from $432 million in 1997 to about $4.1 billion in 2005.

Because nanotechnology is a recent development, the health and safety effects of exposures to nanomaterials, and what levels of exposure may be acceptable, is not yet fully understood. Research concerning the handling of nanomaterials is underway, and guidance for some nanomaterials has been developed. As with any new technology, the earliest exposures are expected to occur among workers conducting research in laboratories and pilot plants, making it important that they work in a manner that is protective of their safety and health.

A risk management system is composed of three parts. Hazard identification involves determining what health and safety concerns are present for both the nanomaterial and its corresponding bulk material, based on a review of safety data sheets, peer-reviewed literature, and guidance documents on the material. For nanomaterials, toxicity hazards are the most important, but dust explosion hazards may also be relevant. Exposure assessment involves determining actual routes of exposure in a specific workplace, including a review of which areas and tasks are most likely to cause exposure. Exposure control involves putting procedures in places to minimize or eliminate exposures according to the hierarchy of hazard controls. Ongoing verification of hazard controls can occur through monitoring of airborne nanomaterial concentrations using standard industrial hygiene sampling methods, and an occupational health surveillance program may be instituted.

A recently adopted risk management method is the Safe by design (SbD) approach. It aims to eliminate or reduce risks of new technologies including nanotechnology, at the design stage of a product or production process. Anticipation of risks is challenging because some risks could emerge only after a technology is implemented (at later stages in the innovation process). In the later cases, the application of other risk management strategies based on non-design principles need to be applied. It considers the purposes and constrains for implementation of SbD approaches in the industrial innovation process and on the basis of those, establish optimal workflows to identify risks and propose solutions to reduce or mitigate them as early as possible in the innovation process called Safe by Design strategies.

== Hazards ==
=== Toxicity ===
==== Respiratory ====
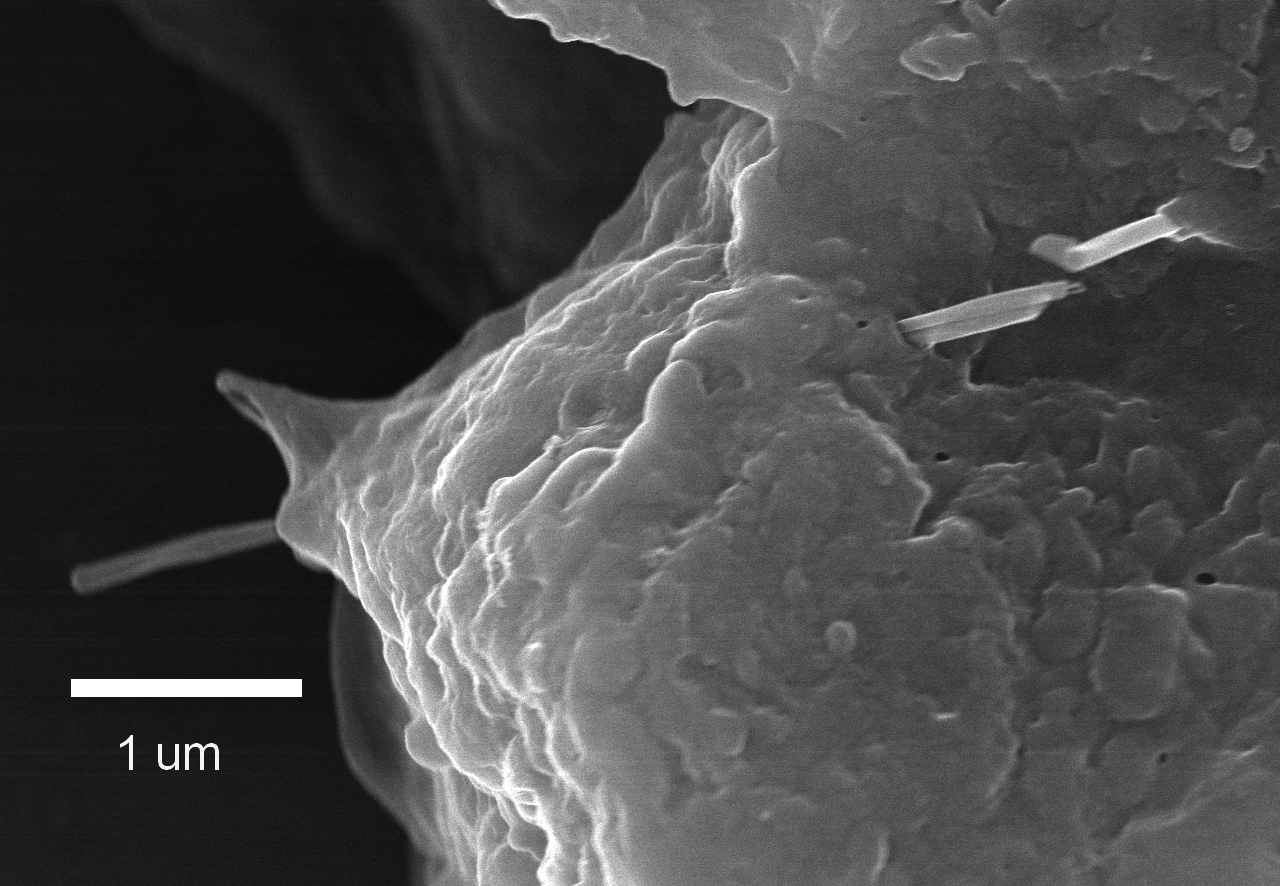
A scanning electron microscope image of bundles of multiwalled carbon nanotube piercing an alveolar epithelial cell.

Inhalation exposure is the most common route of exposure to airborne particles in the workplace. The deposition of nanoparticles in the respiratory tract is determined by the shape and size of particles or their agglomerates, and they are deposited in the alveolar compartment to a greater extent than larger respirable particles. Based on animal studies, nanoparticles may enter the bloodstream from the lungs and translocate to other organs, including the brain. The inhalation risk is affected by the dustiness of the material, the tendency of particles to become airborne in response to a stimulus. Dust generation is affected by the particle shape, size, bulk density, and inherent electrostatic forces, and whether the nanomaterial is a dry powder or incorporated into a slurry or liquid suspension.

Animal studies indicate that carbon nanotubes and carbon nanofibers can cause pulmonary effects including inflammation, granulomas, and pulmonary fibrosis, which were of similar or greater potency when compared with other known fibrogenic materials such as silica, asbestos, and ultrafine carbon black. Some studies in cells or animals have shown genotoxic or carcinogenic effects, or systemic cardiovascular effects from pulmonary exposure. Although the extent to which animal data may predict clinically significant lung effects in workers is not known, the toxicity seen in the short-term animal studies indicate a need for protective action for workers exposed to these nanomaterials. As of 2013, further research was needed in long-term animal studies and epidemiologic studies in workers. No reports of actual adverse health effects in workers using or producing these nanomaterials were known as of 2013. Titanium dioxide (TiO_{2}) dust is considered a lung tumor risk, with ultrafine (nanoscale) particles having an increased mass-based potency relative to fine TiO_{2}, through a secondary genotoxicity mechanism that is not specific to TiO_{2} but primarily related to particle size and surface area.

==== Dermal ====
Some studies suggest that nanomaterials could potentially enter the body through intact skin during occupational exposure. Studies have shown that particles smaller than 1 μm in diameter may penetrate into mechanically flexed skin samples, and that nanoparticles with varying physicochemical properties were able to penetrate the intact skin of pigs. Factors such as size, shape, water solubility, and surface coating directly affect a nanoparticle's potential to penetrate the skin. At this time, it is not fully known whether skin penetration of nanoparticles would result in adverse effects in animal models, although topical application of raw SWCNT to nude mice has been shown to cause dermal irritation, and in vitro studies using primary or cultured human skin cells have shown that carbon nanotubes can enter cells and cause release of pro-inflammatory cytokines, oxidative stress, and decreased viability. It remains unclear, however, how these findings may be extrapolated to a potential occupational risk. In addition, nanoparticles may enter the body through wounds, with particles migrating into the blood and lymph nodes.

==== Gastrointestinal ====
Ingestion can occur from unintentional hand-to-mouth transfer of materials; this has been found to happen with traditional materials, and it is scientifically reasonable to assume that it also could happen during handling of nanomaterials. Ingestion may also accompany inhalation exposure because particles that are cleared from the respiratory tract via the mucociliary escalator may be swallowed.

=== Fire and explosion ===
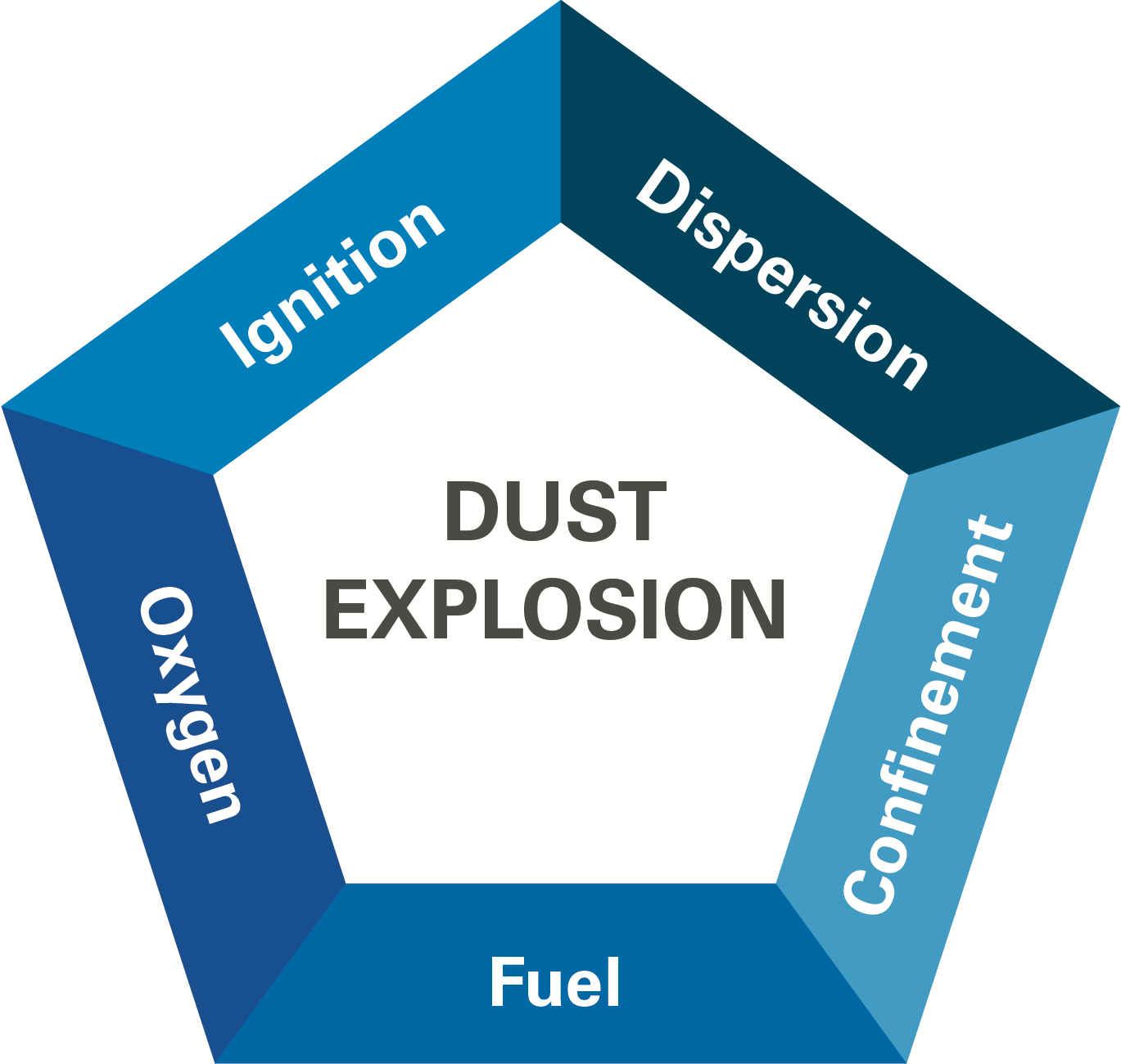
The explosion pentagon is a representation of the five requirements for a dust explosion.

There is concern that engineered carbon nanoparticles, when manufactured on an industrial scale, could pose a dust explosion hazard, especially for processes such as mixing, grinding, drilling, sanding, and cleaning. Knowledge remains limited about the potential explosivity of materials when subdivided down to the nanoscale. The explosion characteristics of nanoparticles are highly dependent on the manufacturer and the humidity.

For microscale particles, as particle size decreases and the specific surface area increases, the explosion severity increases. However, for dusts of organic materials such as coal, flour, methylcellulose, and polyethylene, severity ceases to increase as the particle size is reduced below ~50 μm. This is because decreasing particle size primarily increases the volatilization rate, which becomes rapid enough that that gas phase combustion becomes the rate limiting step, and further decrease in particle size will not increase the overall combustion rate. While the minimum explosion concentration does not vary significantly with nanoparticle size, the minimum ignition energy and temperature have been found to decrease with particle size.

Metal-based nanoparticles exhibit more severe explosions than do carbon nanomaterials, and their chemical reaction pathway is qualitatively different. Studies on aluminum nanoparticles and titanium nanoparticles indicate that they are explosion hazards. One study found that the likelihood of an explosion but not its severity increases significantly for nanoscale metal particles, and they can spontaneously ignite under certain conditions during laboratory testing and handling.

High-resistivity powders can accumulate electric charge causing a spark hazard, and low-resistivity powders can build up in electronics causing a short circuit hazard, both of which can provide an ignition source. In general, powders of nanomaterials have higher resistivity than the equivalent micron-scale powders, and humidity decreases their resistivity. One study found powders of metal-based nanoparticles to be mid- to high-resistivity depending on humidity, while carbon-based nanoparticles were found to be low-resistivity regardless of humidity. Powders of nanomaterials are unlikely to present an unusual fire hazard as compared to their cardboard or plastic packaging, as they are usually produced in small quantities, with the exception of carbon black. However, the catalytic properties of nanoparticles and nanostructured porous materials may cause untended catalytic reactions that, based on their chemical composition, would not otherwise be anticipated.

=== Radioactivity ===
Engineered radioactive nanoparticles have applications in medical diagnostics, medical imaging, toxicokinetics, and environmental health, and are being investigated for applications in nuclear medicine. Radioactive nanoparticles present special challenges in operational health physics and internal dosimetry that are not present for vapors or larger particles, as the nanoparticles' toxicokinetics depend on their physical and chemical properties including size, shape, and surface chemistry. In some cases, the inherent physicochemical toxicity of the nanoparticle itself may lead to lower exposure limits than those associated with the radioactivity alone, which is not the case with most radioactive materials. In general, however, most elements of a standard radiation protection program are applicable to radioactive nanomaterials, and many hazard controls for nanomaterials will be effective with the radioactive versions.

== Hazard controls ==
The hierarchy of hazard controls contains methods for controlling exposures to hazards. Methods listed towards the top potentially more effective than those at the bottom at reducing the risk of illness or injury.

Controlling exposures to hazards is the fundamental method of protecting workers. The hierarchy of hazard control is a framework that encompasses a succession of control methods to reduce the risk of illness or injury. In decreasing order of effectiveness, these are elimination of the hazard, substitution with another material or process that is a lesser hazard, engineering controls that isolate workers from the hazard, administrative controls that change workers' behavior to limit the quantity or duration of exposure, and personal protective equipment worn on the workers' body.

Prevention through design is the concept of applying control methods to minimize hazards early in the design process, with an emphasis on optimizing employee health and safety throughout the life cycle of materials and processes. It increases the cost-effectiveness of occupational safety and health because hazard control methods are integrated early into the process, rather than needing to disrupt existing procedures to include them later. In this context, adopting hazard controls earlier in the design process and higher on the hierarchy of controls leads to faster time to market, improved operational efficiency, and higher product quality.

=== Elimination and substitution ===
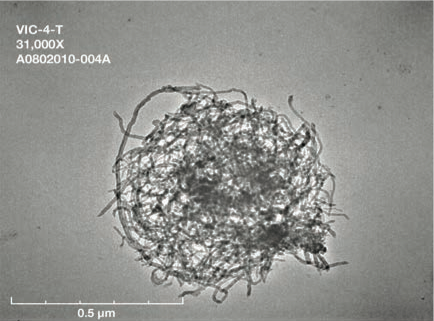
An aerosol droplet containing nanomaterials ejected from a vial during sonication. Eliminating or limiting sonication and other handling processes reduces inhalation hazards.

Elimination and substitution are the most desirable approaches to hazard control, and are most effective early in the design process. Nanomaterials themselves often cannot be eliminated or substituted with conventional materials because their unique properties are necessary to the desired product or process. However, it may be possible to choose properties of the nanoparticle such as size, shape, functionalization, surface charge, solubility, agglomeration, and aggregation state to improve their toxicological properties while retaining the desired functionality. Other materials used incidentally in the process, such as solvents, are also amenable to substitution.

In addition to the materials themselves, procedures used to handle them can be improved. For example, using a nanomaterial slurry or suspension in a liquid solvent instead of a dry powder will reduce dust exposure. Reducing or eliminating steps that involve transfer of powder or opening packages containing nanomaterials also reduces aerosolization and thus the potential hazard to the worker. Reducing agitation procedures such as sonication, and reducing the temperature of reactors to minimize release of nanomaterials in exhaust, also reduce hazards to workers.

=== Engineering controls ===
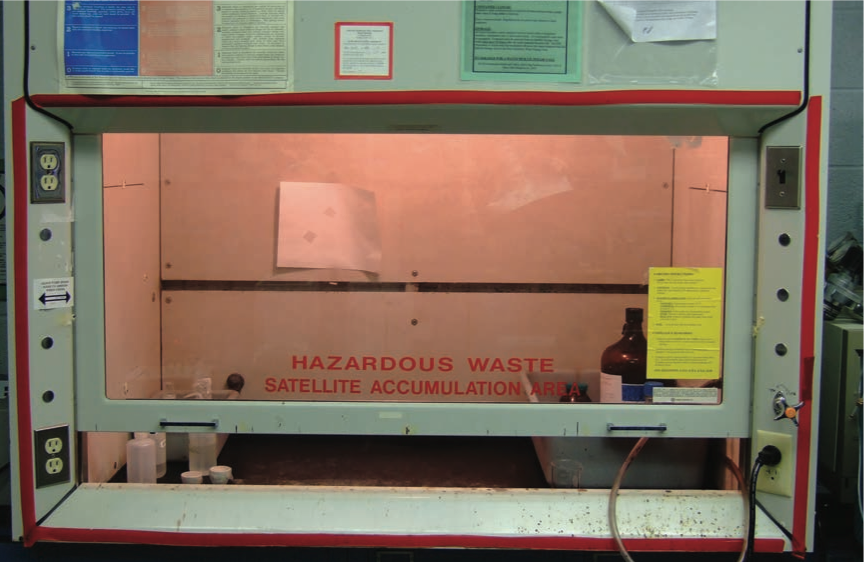
A fume hood is an engineering control using local exhaust ventilation combined with an enclosure.

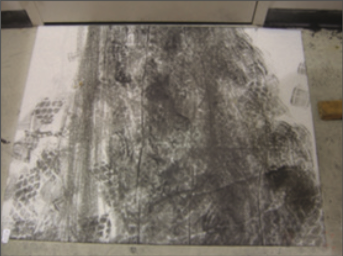
A sticky mat in a nanomaterials production facility. Ideally, other engineering controls should lessen the amount of dust collecting on the floor and being tracked onto the sticky mat, unlike this example.

Engineering controls are physical changes to the workplace that isolate workers from hazards by containing them in an enclosure, or removing contaminated air from the workplace through ventilation and filtering. They are used when hazardous substances and processes cannot be eliminated or replaced with less hazardous substitutes. Well-designed engineering controls are typically passive, in the sense of being independent of worker interactions, which reduces the potential for worker behavior to impact exposure levels. The initial cost of engineering controls can be higher than administrative controls or personal protective equipment, but the long-term operating costs are frequently lower and can sometimes provide cost savings in other areas of the process. The type of engineering control optimal for each situation is influenced by the quantity and dustiness of the material as well as the duration of the task.

Ventilation systems can be local or general. General exhaust ventilation operates on an entire room through a building's HVAC system. It is inefficient and costly as compared to local exhaust ventilation, and is not suitable by itself for controlling exposure, although it can provide negative room pressure to prevent contaminants from exiting the room. Local exhaust ventilation operates at or near the source of contamination, often in conjunction with an enclosure. Examples of local exhaust systems include fume hoods, gloveboxes, biosafety cabinets, and vented balance enclosures. Exhaust hoods lacking an enclosure are less preferable, and laminar flow hoods are not recommended because they direct air outwards towards the worker. Several control verification techniques can be used with ventilation systems, including pitot tubes, hot-wire anemometers, smoke generators, tracer-gas leak testing, and standardized testing and certification procedures.

Examples of non-ventilation engineering controls include placing equipment that may release nanomaterials in a separate room, and placing walk-off sticky mats at room exits. Antistatic devices can be used when handling nanomaterials to reduce their electrostatic charge, making them less likely to disperse or adhere to clothing. Standard dust control methods such as enclosures for conveyor systems, using a sealed system for bag filling, and water spray application are effective at reducing respirable dust concentrations.

=== Administrative controls ===
Administrative controls are changes to workers' behavior to mitigate a hazard. They include training on best practices for safe handling, storage, and disposal of nanomaterials, proper awareness of hazards through labeling and warning signage, and encouraging a general safety culture. Administrative controls can complement engineering controls should they fail, or when they are not feasible or do not reduce exposures to an acceptable level. Some examples of good work practices include cleaning work spaces with wet-wiping methods or a HEPA-filtered vacuum cleaner instead of dry sweeping with a broom, avoiding handling nanomaterials in a free particle state, storing nanomaterials in containers with tightly closed lids. Normal safety procedures such as hand washing, not storing or consuming food in the laboratory, and proper disposal of hazardous waste are also administrative controls. Other examples are limiting the time workers are handling a material or in a hazardous area, and exposure monitoring for the presence of nanomaterials.

=== Personal protective equipment ===
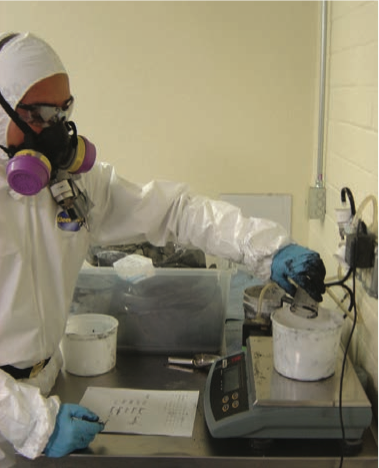
A worker weighing carbon nanotubes. The worker is using personal protective equipment including a respirator, but is not using local engineering controls such as a fume hood.

Personal protective equipment (PPE) must be worn on the worker's body and is the least desirable option for controlling hazards. It is used when other controls are not effective, have not been evaluated, or while doing maintenance or in emergency situations such as spill response. PPE normally used for typical chemicals are also appropriate for nanomaterials, including wearing long pants, long-sleeve shirts, and closed-toed shoes, and the use of safety gloves, goggles, and impervious laboratory coats. Nitrile gloves are preferred because latex gloves do not provide protection from most chemical solvents and may present an allergy hazard. Face shields are not an acceptable replacement for goggles because they do not protect against unbound dry materials. Woven cotton lab coats are not recommended for nanomaterials, as they can become contaminated with nanomaterials and release them later. Donning and removing PPE in a changing room prevents contamination of outside areas.

Respirators are another form of PPE. Respirator filters with a NIOSH air filtration rating of N95 or P100 have been shown to be effective at capturing nanoparticles, although leakage between the respirator seal and the skin may be more significant, especially with half-mask respirators. Surgical masks are not effective against nanomaterials. Smaller nanoparticles of size 4–20 nm are captured more efficiently by filters than larger ones of size 30–100 nm, because Brownian motion results in the smaller particles being more likely to contact a filter fiber. In the United States, the Occupational Safety and Health Administration requires fit testing and medical clearance for use of respirators, and the Environmental Protection Agency requires the use of full face respirators with N100 filters for multi-walled carbon nanotubes not embedded in a solid matrix, if exposure is not otherwise controlled.

== Industrial hygiene ==
=== Occupational exposure limits ===
An occupational exposure limit (OEL) is an upper limit on the acceptable concentration of a hazardous substance in workplace air. As of 2016, quantitative OELs have not been determined for most nanomaterials. Agencies and organizations from several countries, including the British Standards Institute and the Institute for Occupational Safety and Health in Germany, have established OELs for some nanomaterials, and some companies have supplied OELs for their products. As of 2021, the U.S. National Institute for Occupational Safety and Health has determined non-regulatory recommended exposure limits (RELs) for three classes of nanomaterials:

- 1.0 μg/m^{3} for carbon nanotubes and carbon nanofibers as background-corrected elemental carbon as an 8-hour time-weighted average (TWA) respirable mass concentration
- 300 μg/m^{3} for ultrafine titanium dioxide as TWA concentrations for up to 10 hr/day during a 40-hour work week
- 0.9 μg/m^{3} for silver nanoparticles as an airborne respirable 8-hour TWA concentration

A properly tested, half-face particulate respirator will provide protection at exposure concentrations 10 times the REL, while an elastomeric full facepiece respirator with P100 filters will provide protection at 50 times the REL. In the absence of OELs, a control banding scheme may be used. Control banding is a qualitative strategy that uses a rubric to place hazards into one of four categories, or "bands", and each of which has a recommended level of hazard controls. Organizations including GoodNanoGuide, Lawrence Livermore National Laboratory, and Safe Work Australia have developed control banding tools that are specific for nanomaterials. The GoodNanoGuide control banding scheme is based only on exposure duration, whether the material is bound, and the extent of knowledge of the hazards. The LANL scheme assigns points for 15 different hazard parameters and 5 exposure potential factors. Alternatively, the "As Low As Reasonably Achievable" concept may be used.

=== Exposure assessment ===
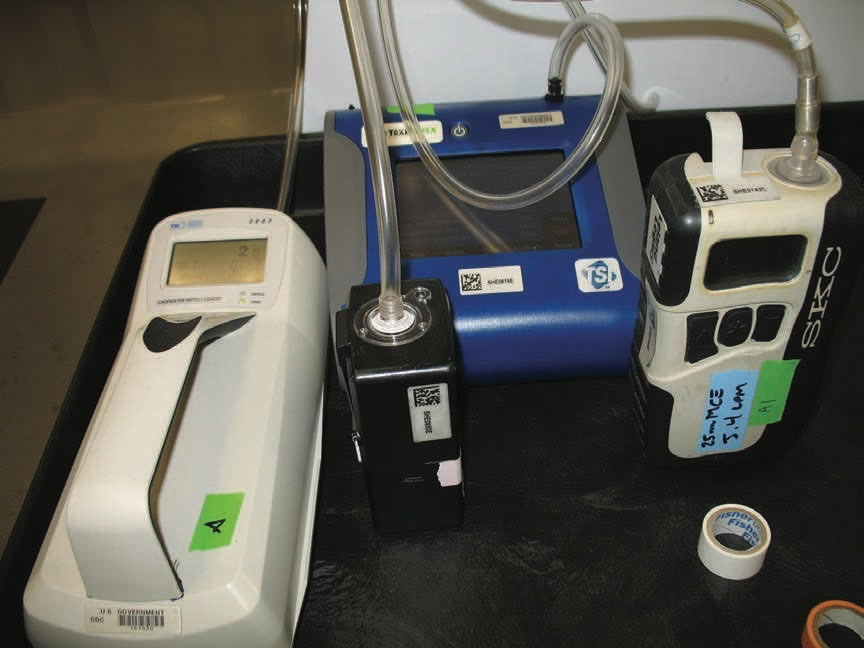
Equipment used for area sampling of airborne nanomaterials. The instruments shown here include a condensation particle counter, aerosol photometer, and two air sampling pumps for filter-based analysis.

Exposure assessment is a set of methods used to monitor contaminant release and exposures to workers. These methods include personal sampling, where samplers are located in the personal breathing zone of the worker, often attached to a shirt collar to be as close to the nose and mouth as possible; and area/background sampling, where they are placed at static locations. Assessment generally use both particle counters, which monitor the real-time quantity of nanomaterials and other background particles; and filter-based samples, which can be used to identify the nanomaterial, usually using electron microscopy and elemental analysis.

Not all instruments used to detect aerosols are suitable for monitoring occupational nanomaterial emissions because they may not be able to detect smaller particles, or may be too large or difficult to ship to a workplace. Suitable particle counters can detect a wide range of particle sizes, as nanomaterials may aggregate in the air. It is recommended to simultaneously test adjacent work areas to establish a background concentration, as direct reading instruments cannot distinguish the target nanomaterial from incidental background nanoparticles from motor or pump exhaust or heating vessels.

While mass-based metrics are traditionally used to characterize toxicological effects of exposure to air contaminants, as of 2013 it was unclear which metrics are most important with regard to engineered nanomaterials. Animal and cell-culture studies have shown that size and shape are the two major factors in their toxicological effects. Surface area and surface chemistry also appeared to be more important than mass concentration.

The NIOSH Nanomaterial Exposure Assessment Technique (NEAT 2.0) is a sampling strategy to determine exposure potential for engineered nanomaterials. It includes filter-based and area samples, as well as a comprehensive assessment of emissions at processes and job tasks to better understand peak emission periods. Evaluation of worker practices, ventilation efficacy, and other engineering exposure control systems and risk management strategies serve to allow for a comprehensive exposure assessment. The NIOSH Manual of Analytical Methods includes guidance on electron microscopy of filter samples of carbon nanotubes and nanofibers, and additionally some NIOSH methods developed for other chemicals can be used for off-line analysis of nanomaterials, including their morphology and geometry, elemental carbon content (relevant for carbon-based nanomaterials), and elemental makeup. Efforts to create reference materials are ongoing.

=== Occupational health surveillance ===
Occupational health surveillance involves the ongoing systematic collection, analysis, and dissemination of exposure and health data on groups of workers, for the purpose of preventing disease and evaluating the effectiveness of intervention programs. It encompasses both medical surveillance and hazard surveillance. A basic medical surveillance program contains a baseline medical evaluation and periodic follow-up examinations, post-incident evaluations, worker training, and identification of trends or patterns from medical screening data.

The related topic of medical screening focuses on the early detection of adverse health effects for individual workers, to provide an opportunity for intervention before disease processes occur. Screening may involve obtaining and reviewing an occupational history, medical examination, and medical testing. As of 2016, there were no specific screening tests or health evaluations to identify health effects in people that are caused solely by exposure to engineered nanomaterials. However, any medical screening recommendations for the bulk material that a nanoparticle is made of still apply, and in 2013 NIOSH concluded that the toxicologic evidence on carbon nanotubes and carbon nanofibers had advanced enough to make specific recommendations for the medical surveillance and screening of exposed workers. Medical screening and resulting interventions represent secondary prevention and do not replace primary prevention efforts based on direct hazard controls to minimize employee exposures to nanomaterials.

=== Emergency preparedness ===
It is recommended that a nanomaterial spill kit be assembled prior to an emergency and include barricade tape, nitrile or other chemically impervious gloves, an elastomeric full-facepiece respirator with P100 or N100 filters (fitted appropriately to the responder), adsorbent materials such as spill mats, disposable wipes, sealable plastic bags, walk-off sticky mats, a spray bottle with deionized water or another appropriate liquid to wet dry powders, and a HEPA-filtered vacuum. It is considered unsafe to use compressed air, dry sweeping, and vacuums without a HEPA filter to clear dust.

== Regulation ==
=== United States ===
The Food and Drug Administration regulates nanomaterials under the Federal Food, Drug, and Cosmetic Act when used as food additives, drugs, or cosmetics. The Consumer Product Safety Commission requires testing and certification of many consumer products for compliance with consumer product safety requirements, and cautionary labeling of hazardous substances under the Federal Hazardous Substances Act.

The General Duty Clause of the Occupational Safety and Health Act requires all employers to keep their workplace free of serious recognized hazards. The Occupational Safety and Health Administration also has recording and reporting requirements for occupational injuries and illness under 29 CFR 1904 for businesses with more than 10 employees, and protection and communication regulations under 29 CFR 1910. Companies producing new products containing nanomaterials must use the Hazard Communication Standard to create safety data sheets containing 16 sections for downstream users such as customers, workers, disposal services, and others. This may require toxicological or other testing, and all data or information provided must be vetted by properly controlled testing The ISO/TR 13329 standard provides guidance specifically on the preparation of safety data sheets for nanomaterials. The National Institute for Occupational Safety and Health does not issue regulations, but conducts research and makes recommendations to prevent worker injury and illness. State and local governments may have additional regulations.

The Environmental Protection Agency (EPA) regulates nanomaterials under the Toxic Substances Control Act, and has permitted limited manufacture of new chemical nanomaterials through the use of consent orders or Significant New Use Rules (SNURs). In 2011 EPA issued a SNUR on multi-walled carbon nanotubes, codified as 40 CFR 721.10155. Other statutes falling in the EPA's jurisdiction may apply, such as Federal Insecticide, Fungicide, and Rodenticide Act (if bacterial claims are being made), Clean Air Act, or Clean Water Act. EPA regulates nanomaterials under the same provisions as other hazardous chemical substances.

=== Other countries ===
In the European Union, nanomaterials classified by the European Commission as hazardous chemical substances are regulated under the European Chemical Agency's Registration, Evaluation, Authorisation, and Restriction of Chemicals (REACH) regulation, as well as the Classification, Labeling, and Packaging (CLP) regulations. Under the REACH regulation, companies have the responsibility of collecting information on the properties and uses of substances that they manufacture or import at or above quantities of 1 ton per year, including nanomaterials. There are special provisions for cosmetics that contain nanomaterials, and for biocidal materials under the Biocidal Products Regulation (BPR) when at least 50% of their primary particles are nanoparticles.

In the United Kingdom, powders of nanomaterials may fall under the Chemicals (Hazard Information and Packaging for Supply) Regulations 2002, as well as the Dangerous Substances and Explosive Atmosphere Regulations 2002 if they are capable of fueling a dust explosion.

== See also ==
- Construction | Construction waste
- Diesel particulate matter
- Laboratory safety
- Power tool
- Renovation
- Toxicology of carbon nanomaterials
- Ultrafine particles
- Open burning of waste
