= Smoke generator =

Smoke generator may refer to:

- Smoke bomb, used in fireworks or pranks
- Smoke grenade, used for signaling and concealment, especially in military contexts
- Smoke testing (mechanical)
- Theatrical smoke and fog
- A device on a military vehicle which generates a smoke screen

== See also ==
- Smoke testing (disambiguation)
