= Radioactive nanoparticle =

A radioactive nanoparticle is a nanoparticle that contains radioactive materials. Radioactive nanoparticles have applications in medical diagnostics, medical imaging, toxicokinetics, and environmental health, and are being investigated for applications in nuclear nanomedicine. Radioactive nanoparticles present special challenges in operational health physics and internal dosimetry that are not present for other substances, although existing radiation protection measures and hazard controls for nanoparticles generally apply.

== Types and applications ==
=== Engineered ===
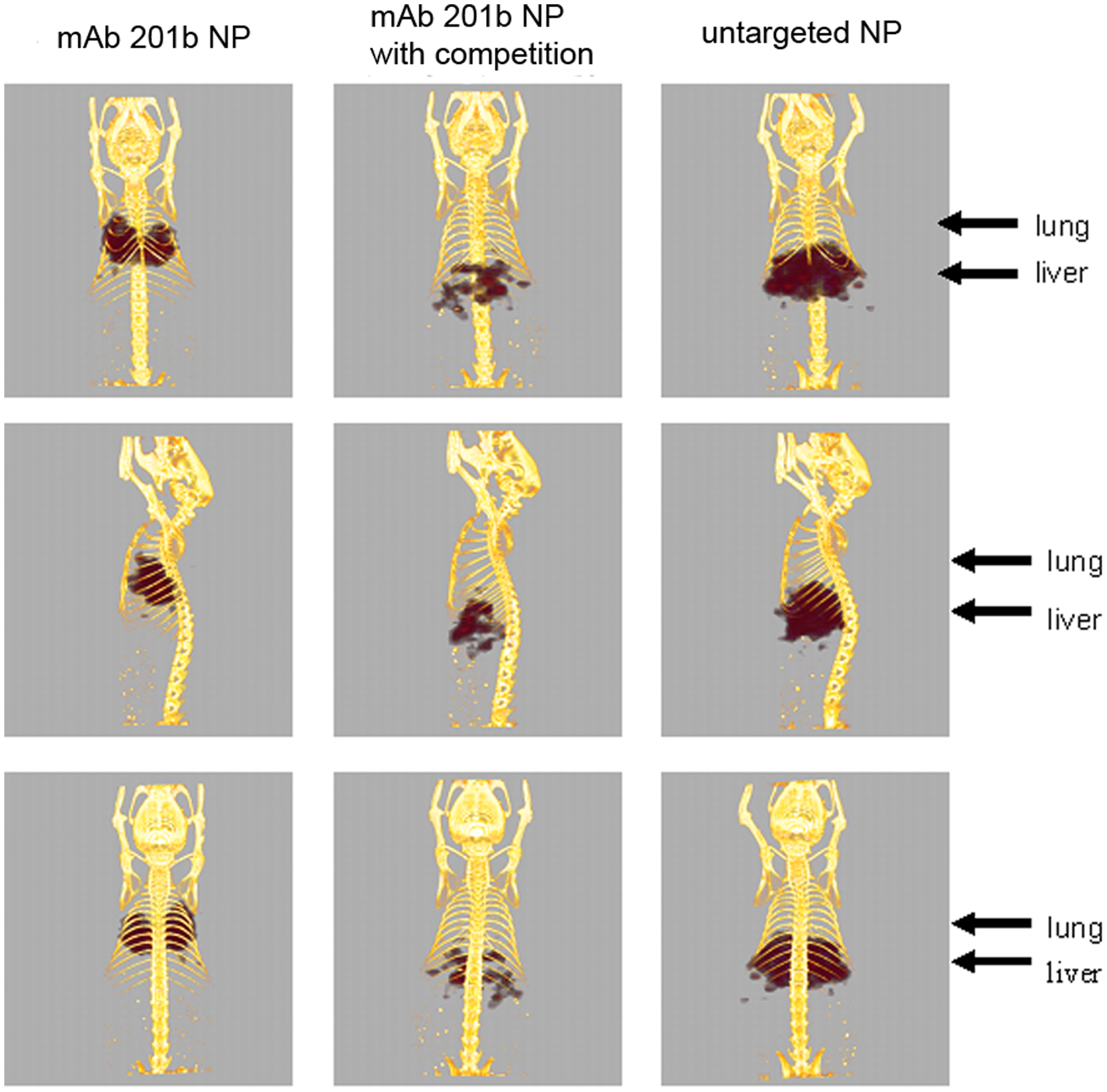
SPECT/CT images of injected gold-coated lanthanum/gadolinium phosphate nanoparticles containing the alpha-emitting radionuclide actinium-225 in a mouse. Depending on the surface functionalization, the particles migrate either to the lungs or the liver.

Engineered radioactive nanoparticles are used in medical imaging techniques such as positron emission tomography and single-photon emission computed tomography, and an aerosol of carbon nanoparticles containing technetium-99m are used in a commercially available procedure for ventilation/perfusion scintigraphy of the lungs. Engineered radioactive nanoparticles are also used as a radiolabel to detect the presence of the nanoparticles themselves in environmental health and toxicokinetics studies.

Engineered radioactive nanoparticles are being investigated for therapeutic use combining nuclear medicine with nanomedicine, especially for cancer. Neutron capture therapy is one such potential application. In addition, nanoparticles can help to sequester the toxic daughter nuclides of alpha emitters when used in radiotherapy.

Nuclear imaging is non-invasive and has high sensitivity, and nanoparticles are useful as a platform for combining multiple copies of targeting vectors and effectors in order to selectively deliver radioisotopes to a specific region of interest. Other benefits of nanoparticles for diagnostic and therapeutic use include increased blood and tumor retention time, as well as the possibility of using their unique physical and chemical properties in treatment. However, the nanoparticles must be engineered to avoid being recognized by the mononuclear phagocyte system and transported to the liver or spleen, often through manipulating their surface functionalization.

Targeting techniques include functionalizing radioactive nanoparticles with antibodies to target them to a specific tissue, and using magnetic nanoparticles that are attracted to a magnet placed over the tumor site. Technetium-99m, indium-111, and iodine-131 are common radioisotopes used for these purposes, with many others used as well. Radioactive nanoparticles can be produced by either synthesizing the nanoparticles directly from the radioactive materials, or by irradiating non-radioactive particles with neutrons or accelerated ions, sometimes in situ.

=== Natural and incidental ===
As with all nanoparticles, radioactive nanoparticles can also be naturally occurring or incidentally produced as a byproduct of industrial processes. The main source of naturally occurring nanomaterials containing radionuclides is the decay of radon gas, whose immediate decay products are non-gaseous elements that precipitate into nanoscale particles along with atmospheric dust and vapors. Minor natural sources include primordial radionuclides present in the nanoscale portion of volcanic ash, and primordial and cosmogenic nuclides taken up by plants which are later burned. Radioactive nanoparticles may be incidentally produced by procedures in the nuclear industry such as nuclear reprocessing and the cutting of contaminated objects.

== Health and safety ==
Radioactive nanoparticles combine the hazards of radioactive materials with the hazards of nanomaterials. Inhalation exposure is the most common route of exposure to airborne particles in the workplace. Animal studies on some classes of nanoparticles indicate pulmonary effects including inflammation, granulomas, and pulmonary fibrosis, which were of similar or greater potency when compared with other known fibrogenic materials such as silica, asbestos, and ultrafine carbon black. Some studies in cells or animals have shown genotoxic or carcinogenic effects, or systemic cardiovascular effects from pulmonary exposure. The hazards of ionizing radiation depend on whether the exposure is acute or chronic, and includes effects like radiation-induced cancer and teratogenesis. In some cases, the inherent physicochemical toxicity of the nanoparticle itself may lead to lower exposure limits than those associated with the radioactivity alone, which is not the case with most radioactive materials.

Radioactive nanoparticles present special challenges in operational health physics and internal dosimetry that are not present for other substances, as the nanoparticles' toxicokinetics depend on their physical and chemical properties including size, shape, and surface chemistry. For example, inhaled nanoparticles will deposit in different locations in the lungs, and will be metabolized and transported through the body differently, than vapors or larger particles. There may also be hazards from associated processes such as strong magnetic fields and cryogens used in imaging equipment, and handling of lab animals in experimental studies. Effective risk assessment and communication is important, as both nanotechnology and radiation have unique considerations with public perception.

=== Hazard controls ===
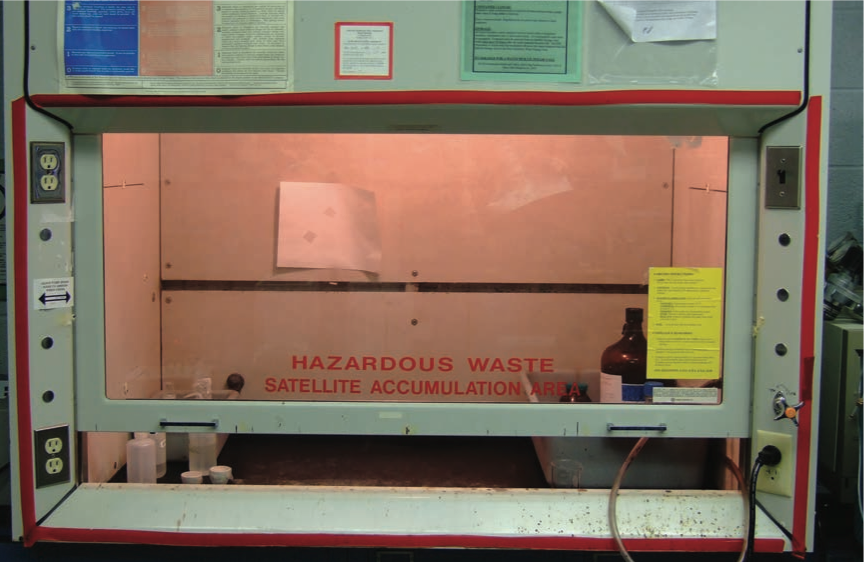
A fume hood is an engineering control typically used to protect workers using nanoparticles.

In general, most elements of a standard radiation protection program are applicable to radioactive nanomaterials, and many hazard controls for nanomaterials will be effective with the radioactive versions. The hierarchy of hazard controls encompasses a succession of five categories of control methods to reduce the risk of illness or injury. The two most effective are elimination and substitution, for example reducing dust exposure by eliminating a sonication process or substituting a nanomaterial slurry or suspension in a liquid solvent instead of a dry powder. Substitutions should consider both the radioactivity and physicochemical hazards of all the options, and also take into account that radioactive nanomaterials are easier to detect than non-radioactive substances.

Engineering controls should be the primary form of protection, including local exhaust systems such as fume hoods, gloveboxes, biosafety cabinets, and vented balance enclosures; radiation shielding; and access control systems. The need for negative room pressure to prevent contamination of outside areas can conflict with the customary use of positive pressure when pharmaceuticals are being handled, although this can be overcome through use of a cascade pressure system, or by handling nanomaterials in enclosures.

Administrative controls include procedures to limit radiation doses, and contamination control procedures including encouraging good work practices and monitoring for contamination. Personal protective equipment is the least effective and should be used in conjunction with other hazard controls. In general, personal protective equipment intended for radioactive materials should be effective with radioactive nanomaterials, including impervious laboratory coats, goggles, safety gloves, and in some cases respirators, although the greater potential penetration through clothing and mobility in air of nanoparticles should be taken into account.

== See also ==
- Health and safety hazards of nanomaterials
- Radiation protection
