= Smoke testing =

Smoke testing may refer to:

- Smoke testing (electrical) looking for smoke when powering electrical items for the first time
- Smoke testing (mechanical) the practice of using smoke to test for leaks
- Smoke testing (software) trying the major functions of software before carrying out formal testing
- Smoke testing, with theatrical smoke and fog
- Testing smoke detectors with artificial smoke
