= Ultrafine particle =

Particulate matter under 100 nm in diameter

Ultrafine particles (UFPs) are particulate matter of nanoscale size (less than 0.1 μm or 100 nm in diameter). Regulations do not exist for this size class of ambient air pollution particles, which are far smaller than the regulated PM_{10} and PM_{2.5} particle classes and are believed to have several more aggressive health implications than those classes of larger particulates per unit mass. Although they remain largely unregulated, the World Health Organization has published good practice statements regarding measuring UFPs.

There are two main divisions that categorize types of UFPs. UFPs can either be carbon-based or metallic, and then can be further subdivided by their magnetic properties. Electron microscopy and special physical lab conditions allow scientists to observe UFP morphology. Airborne UFPs can be measured using a condensation particle counter, in which particles are mixed with alcohol vapor and then cooled, allowing the vapor to condense around them, after which they are counted using a light scanner. UFPs are both manufactured and naturally occurring. UFPs are the main constituent of airborne particulate matter by number, although they contribute little to mass. Owing to their large quantity and ability to penetrate deep within the lung, UFPs are a major concern for respiratory exposure and health.

== Sources and applications ==
UFPs are both manufactured and naturally occurring. Hot volcanic lava, ocean spray, and smoke are common natural UFPs sources, as is the nucleation of gases in the air. UFPs can be intentionally fabricated as fine particles to serve a vast range of applications in both medicine and technology. Other UFPs are byproducts, like emissions, from specific processes, combustion reactions, or equipment such as printer toner and automobile exhaust. Anthropogenic sources of UFPs include combustion of gas, coal or hydrocarbons, biomass burning (i.e. agricultural burning, forest fires and waste disposal), vehicular traffic and industrial emissions, tire wear and tear from car brakes, air traffic, seaport, maritime transportation, construction, demolition, restoration and concrete processing, domestic wood stoves, outdoor burning, kitchen, and cigarette smoke.

In 2014, an air quality study found harmful ultrafine particles from the takeoffs and landings at Los Angeles International Airport to be of much greater magnitude than previously thought. There are a multitude of indoor sources that include but are not limited to laser printers, fax machines, photocopiers, the peeling of citrus fruits, cooking, tobacco smoke, penetration of contaminated outdoor air, chimney cracks and vacuum cleaners.

UFPs have a variety of applications in the medical and technology fields. They are used in diagnostic imagining, and novel drug delivery systems that include targeting the circulatory system, and or passage of the blood brain barrier to name just a few. Certain UFPs like silver based nanostructures have antimicrobial properties that are exploited in wound healing and internal instrumental coatings among other uses, in order to prevent infections. In the area of technology, carbon based UFPs have a plethora of applications in computers. This includes the use of graphene and carbon nanotubes in electronic as well as other computer and circuitry components. Some UFPs have characteristics similar to gas or liquid and are useful in powders or lubricants.

== Exposure, risk, and health effects ==
The main exposure to UFPs is through inhalation. Owing to their size, UFPs are considered to be respirable particles. Contrary to the behaviour of inhaled PM_{10} and PM_{2.5}, ultrafine particles are deposited in the lungs, where they have the ability to penetrate tissue and undergo interstitialization, or to be absorbed directly into the bloodstream—and therefore are not easily removed from the body and may have immediate effect. Exposure to UFPs, even if components are not very toxic, may cause oxidative stress, inflammatory mediator release, and could induce heart disease, lung disease, and other systemic effects.

The exact mechanism through which UFP exposure leads to health effects remains to be elucidated, but effects on blood pressure may play a role. It has recently been reported that UFP is associated with an increase in blood pressure in schoolchildren with the smallest particles inducing the largest effect. According to research, infants whose mothers were exposed to higher levels of UFPs during pregnancy are much more likely to develop asthma.

There is a range of potential human exposures that include occupational, due to the direct manufacturing process or a byproduct from an industrial or office environment, as well as incidental, from contaminated outdoor air and other byproduct emissions. In order to quantify exposure and risk, both in vivo and in vitro studies of various UFP species are currently being done using a variety of animal models including mouse, rat, and fish. These studies aim to establish toxicological profiles necessary for risk assessment, risk management, and potential regulation and legislation.

Some sizes of UFPs may be filtered from the air using ULPA filters.

== Regulation and legislation ==
As the nanotechnology industry has grown, nanoparticles have brought UFPs more public and regulatory attention. UFP risk assessment research is still in the very early stages. There are continuing debates about whether to regulate UFPs and how to research and manage the health risks they may pose.

As of March 19, 2008, the EPA does not yet regulate ultrafine particle emissions. The EPA does require notification of the intentional manufacture of nanoparticles. In 2008, the EPA drafted a Nanomaterial Research Strategy. There is also debate about how the European Union (EU) should regulate UFPs.

== Political disputes ==
There is political dispute between China and South Korea on ultrafine dust. South Korea claims that about 80% of ultrafine dust comes from China, and China and South Korea should cooperate to reduce the level of fine dust. China, however, argues that the Chinese government has already implemented its policy regarding ecological environment. According to China's government, its quality of air has been improved more than 40% since 2013. However, the air pollution in South Korea got worse. Therefore, the dispute between China and South Korea has become political.

In March 2019, Seoul Research Institute of Public Health and Environment said that 50% to 70% of the fine dust is from China, therefore China is responsible for the air pollution in South Korea. This dispute provokes dispute among citizens as well. In July 2014, China's paramount leader Xi Jinping and the South Korean government agreed to enforce Korea-China Cooperative Project, regarding Sharing of observation data on air pollutions, joint research on an air pollution forecast model and air pollution source identification, and human resources exchanges, etc.

Followed by this agreement, in 2018, China and South Korea signed China-Korea Environmental Cooperation Plan to resolute environmental issues. China Research Academy of Environmental Studies (CRAES) in Beijing is developing a building for China-Korea Environmental Cooperation Center including office building and laboratory building. Based on this cooperation, South Korea already sent 10 experts on environments to China for research, and China will also send more experts for long-term research. By this bilateral relations, China and Republic of Korea are seeking resolution on air pollution in North East Asia region, and seeks international security.

== See also ==
- Diesel particulate matter
- Health and safety hazards of nanomaterials
- Metal fume fever
- Metal working
- Microplastics
- Nanostructures
- Open burning of waste
- Power tool
- Renovation
- Welding
- Wildfire
- Fumed silica
