= Magic smoke =

Joke term for smoke from failed electronics

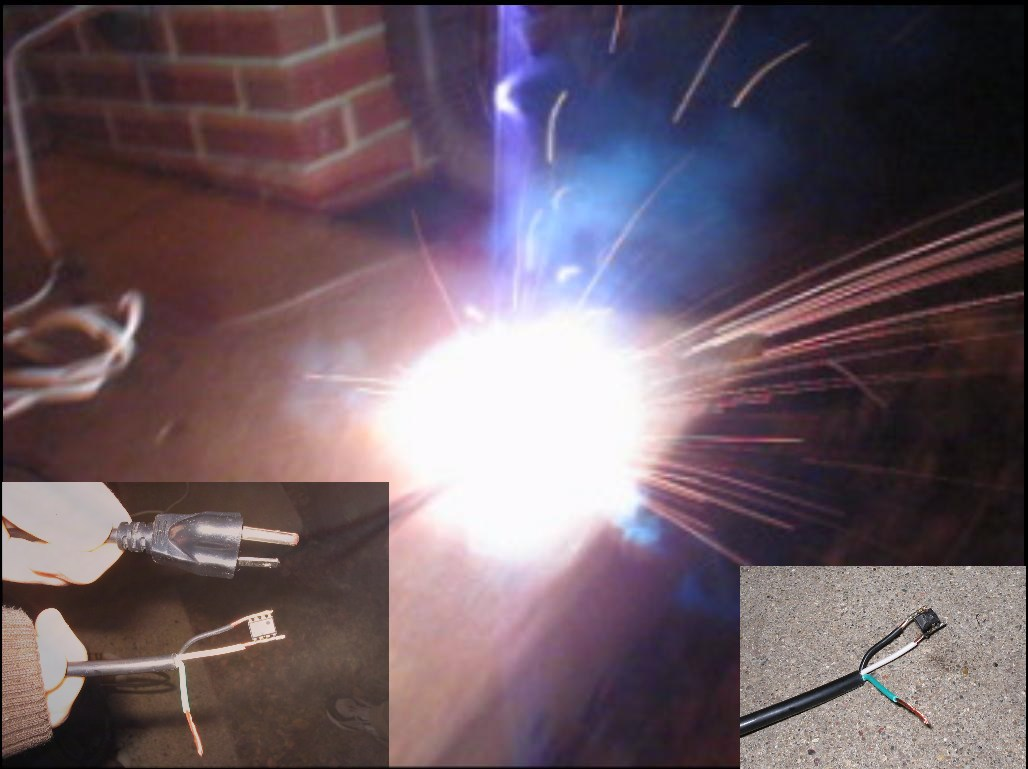
"Magic" smoke being released from an electronic component for demonstration purposes

Magic smoke (also factory smoke, blue smoke, or the genie) is a humorous name for the caustic smoke produced by severe electrical over-stress of electronic circuits or components, causing overheating and an accompanying release of smoke. The smoke typically smells of burning plastic and other chemicals. The color of the smoke depends on which component is overheating, but it is commonly blue, grey, or white. Minor overstress eventually results in component failure, but without pyrotechnic display or release of smoke. A power transistor inside a power supply is a frequent culprit for the acrid smoke.

The name is a running in-joke that started among electrical engineers and technicians, which was later adopted by programmers and computer scientists. The jargon file, a compendium of historical and current hacker jargon, defines:

magic smoke: n.

A substance trapped inside IC packages that enables them to function (also called blue smoke; this is similar to the archaic phlogiston hypothesis about combustion). Its existence is demonstrated by what happens when a chip burns up: the magic smoke gets out, whereupon the chip ceases to function, hence the smoke is essential for the chip's function.

The device operates as long as the magic smoke is trapped inside of it, but when the smoke escapes from it, the device ceases to operate. Post hoc ergo propter hoc the smoke (a sort of élan vital) is an essential part of the device and its operation via undetermined ("magical") means.

== Usage ==
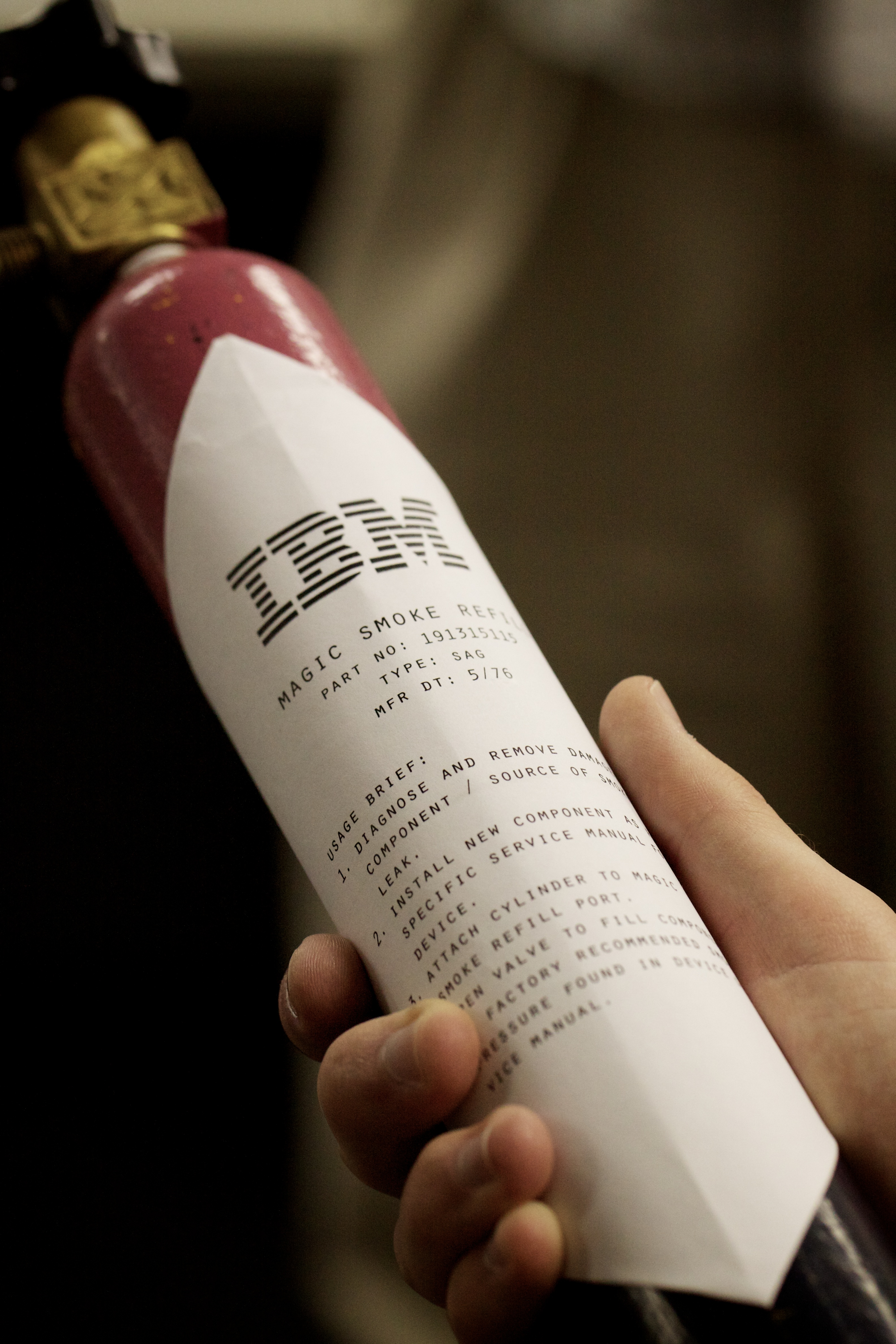
Gag IBM magic smoke refill. Note the "magic smoke" valve in the instructions.

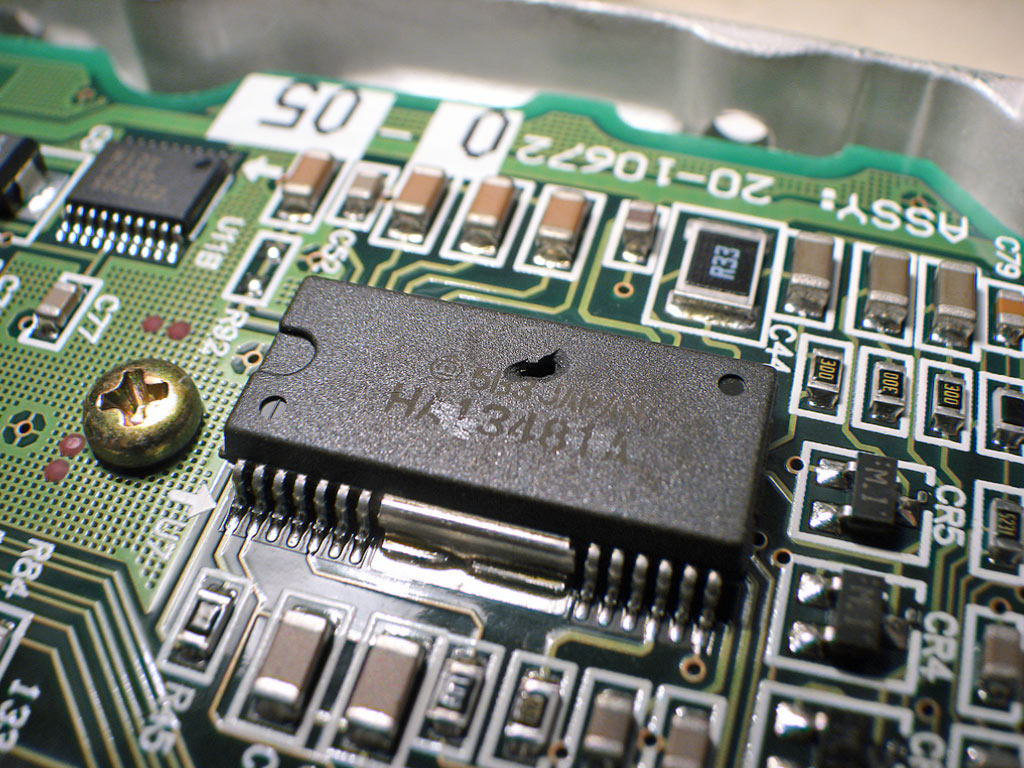
An integrated circuit rendered useless after overheating, the presumptive magic smoke having burnt through

This has led to phrases (and variants of) "You let the smoke out!", "The magic smoke is escaping." or "I think you set your power supply too high; there is magic smoke coming from that resistor!" as euphemisms for the destruction of a component by overheating.

When a device is powered on for the first time it is sometimes called a "smoke test", as any purely electrical defects would be revealed.

Red Hat Linux 6.1 included the following text in the hardware compatibility guide:

Tier 3 Incompatible and Unsupported CPUs

- Smokeless CPUs: Smokeless CPUs are incompatible with the linux kernel and it is doubted that any work will ever be performed to change this. They are simply too unreliable in even the most standard system configuration. Those with a CPU missing its Magic Smoke should switch to a new CPU.

The joke in the above quotation is the concept of a Smokeless CPU—one in which the vital magic smoke has been released, rendering it inoperative. The joke remained in Red Hat 6.2, but was removed in a subsequent version.
