= Smoke testing (electrical) =

Electrical test

Smoke testing refers to various classes of tests of systems, usually intended to determine whether they are ready for more robust testing. The expression probably was first used in plumbing in referring to tests for the detection of cracks, leaks or breaks in closed systems of pipes. By metaphorical extension the term is used in electronics. In Lessons Learned in Software Testing, Cem Kaner, James Bach, and Brett Pettichord provided the origin of the term:

The phrase smoke test comes from electronic hardware testing. You plug in a new board and turn on the power. If you see smoke coming from the board, turn off the power. You don't have to do any more testing.

== In electronics and electrical engineering ==
In electronics and electrical engineering, the term smoke test or power on test is used to refer to the first time a circuit under development is attached to power, which will sometimes produce actual smoke if a design or wiring mistake has been made. Most often, this smoke comes from burning resistors, which produce a distinctive smell due to the phenol resin coating combusting. For certain circuits, overheating and burning due to circuitry that is still not properly operating can be avoided by slowly turning up the input voltage to the unit under test by using a variable autotransformer and watching the electric current consumption.

Overloaded integrated circuits typically produce "blue smoke" (or magic smoke). "Blue smoke" is the subject of jokes among technicians who refer to it as if it were a genie in the circuit: It's the blue smoke that makes it work—let out the blue smoke and it won't do anything.
