= Toxicology of carbon nanomaterials =

The toxicology of carbon nanomaterials is the study of toxicity in carbon nanomaterials, such as fullerenes and carbon nanotubes.

== Fullerenes ==
A review of works on fullerene toxicity by Lalwani et al. found little evidence that C_{60} is toxic. The toxicity of these carbon nanoparticles varies with dose, duration, type (e.g., C_{60}, C_{70}, M@C_{60}, M@C_{82}), functional groups used to water-solubilize these nanoparticles (e.g., OH, COOH), and method of administration (e.g., intravenous, intraperitoneal). The authors recommended that the pharmacology of each fullerene- or metallofullerene-based complex be assessed as a different compound.

Moussa et al. (1996–97) studied the in vivo toxicity of C_{60} after intra-peritoneal administration of large doses. No evidence of toxicity was found and the mice tolerated a dose of 5 g/kg of body weight. Mori et al. (2006) could not find toxicity in rodents for C_{60} and C_{70} mixtures after oral administration of a dose of 2 g/kg body weight and did not observe evidence of genotoxic or mutagenic potential in vitro. Other studies could not establish the toxicity of fullerenes: on the contrary, the work of Gharbi et al. (2005) suggested that aqueous C_{60} suspensions failing to produce acute or subacute toxicity in rodents could also protect their livers in a dose-dependent manner against free-radical damage. In a 2012 primary study of an olive oil / C_{60} suspension administered to rats by intra-peritoneal administration or oral gavage, a prolonged lifespan to almost double the normal lifespan of the rats was seen and significant toxicity was not observed. An investigator for this study, Professor Moussa, generalized from its findings in a video interview and stated that pure C_{60} is not toxic.

When considering toxicological data, care must be taken to distinguish as necessary between what are normally referred to as fullerenes: (C_{60}, C_{70}, ...); fullerene derivatives: C_{60} or other fullerenes with covalently bonded chemical groups; fullerene complexes (e.g., water-solubilized with surfactants, such as C_{60}-PVP; host–guest complexes, such as with cyclodextrin), where the fullerene is supermolecular bound to another molecule; C_{60} nanoparticles, which are extended solid-phase aggregates of C_{60} crystallites; and nanotubes, which are generally much larger (in terms of molecular weight and size) molecules, and are different in shape to the spheroidal fullerenes C_{60} and C_{70}, as well as having different chemical and physical properties.

The molecules above are all fullerenes (close-caged all-carbon molecules) but it is unreliable to extrapolate results from C_{60} to nanotubes or vice versa, as they range from insoluble materials in either hydrophilic or lipophilic media, to hydrophilic, lipophilic, or even amphiphilic molecules, and with other varying physical and chemical properties. A quantitative structural analysis relationship (QSAR) study can analyze on how close the molecules under consideration are in physical and chemical properties, which can help.

== Carbon nanotubes ==
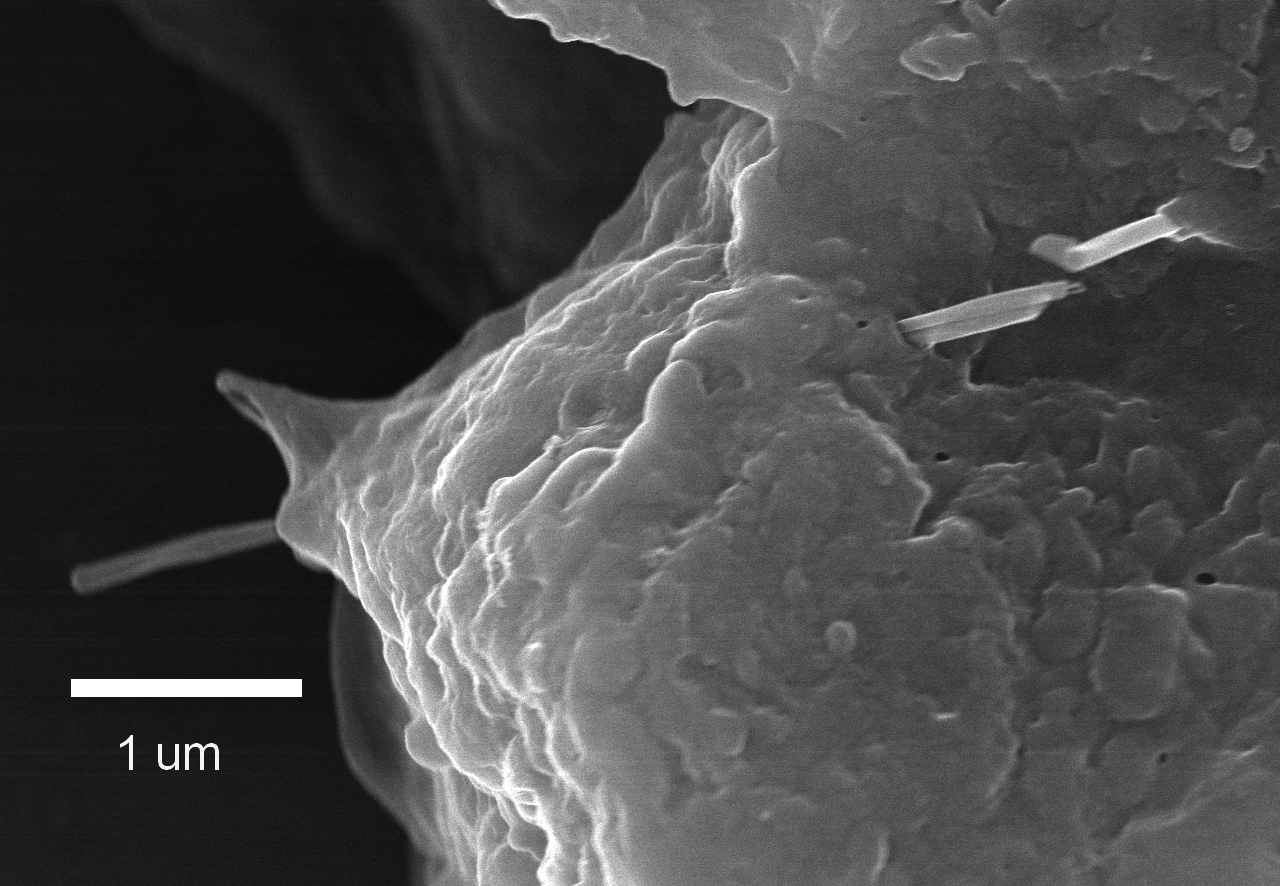
A multiwalled carbon nanotube pierces an alveolar epithelial cell.

As of 2013, the United States National Institute for Occupational Safety and Health was not aware of any reports of adverse health effects in workers using or producing carbon nanotubes or carbon nanofibers. However a systematic review of 54 laboratory animal studies indicated that they could cause adverse pulmonary effects including inflammation, granulomas, and pulmonary fibrosis, which were of similar or greater potency when compared with other known fibrogenic materials such as silica, asbestos, and ultrafine carbon black.

With reference to nanotubes, a 2008 study on carbon nanotubes introduced into the abdominal cavity of mice led the authors to suggest comparisons to "asbestos-like pathogenicity". This was not an inhalation study, though there have been several performed in the past, therefore it is premature to conclude that nanotubes should be considered to have a toxicological profile similar to asbestos. Conversely, and perhaps illustrative of how the various classes of molecules which fall under the general term fullerene cover a wide range of properties, Sayes et al. found that in vivo inhalation of C_{60}(OH)_{24} and nano-C_{60} in rats gave no effect, whereas in comparison quartz particles produced an inflammatory response under the same conditions. As stated above, nanotubes are quite different in chemical and physical properties to C_{60}, i.e., molecular weight, shape, size, physical properties (such as solubility) all are very different, so from a toxicological standpoint, different results for C_{60} and nanotubes are not suggestive of any discrepancy in the findings.

A 2016 study reported on workers in a large-scale MWCNT manufacturing facility in Russia with relatively high occupational exposure levels, finding that exposure to MWCNTs caused significant increase in several inflammatory cytokines and other biomarkers for interstitial lung disease.

=== Toxicity ===
The toxicity of carbon nanotubes has been an important question in nanotechnology. As of 2007, such research had just begun. The data is still fragmentary and subject to criticism. Preliminary results highlight the difficulties in evaluating the toxicity of this heterogeneous material. Parameters such as structure, size distribution, surface area, surface chemistry, surface charge, and agglomeration state as well as purity of the samples, have considerable impact on the reactivity of carbon nanotubes. However, available data clearly show that, under some conditions, nanotubes can cross membrane barriers, which suggests that, if raw materials reach the organs, they can induce harmful effects such as inflammatory and fibrotic reactions.

==== Effects Characterization ====
In 2014, experts from the International Agency for Research on Cancer (IARC) assessed the carcinogenicity of CNTs, including SWCNTs and MWCNTs. No human epidemiologic or cancer data was available to the IARC Working Group at the time, so the evaluation focused on the results of in vivo animal studies assessing the carcinogenicity of SWCNTs and MWCNTs in rodents.

The Working Group concluded that there was sufficient evidence for the specific MWCNT type "MWCNT-7", limited evidence for the two other types of MWCNTs with dimensions similar to MWCNT-7, and inadequate evidence for SWCNTs. Therefore, it was agreed to specifically classify MWCNT-7 as possibly carcinogenic to humans (Group 2B) while the other forms of CNT, namely SWCNT and other types of MWCNT, excluding MWCNT-7, were considered not classifiable as to their carcinogenicity to humans (Group 3) due to a lack of coherent evidence.

Results of rodent studies collectively show that regardless of the process by which CNTs were synthesized and the types and amounts of metals they contained, CNTs were capable of producing inflammation, epithelioid granulomas (microscopic nodules), fibrosis, and biochemical/toxicological changes in the lungs. Comparative toxicity studies in which mice were given equal weights of test materials showed that SWCNTs were more toxic than quartz, which is considered a serious occupational health hazard when chronically inhaled. As a control, ultrafine carbon black was shown to produce minimal lung responses.

Carbon nanotubes deposit in the alveolar ducts by aligning lengthwise with the airways; the nanotubes will often combine with metals. The needle-like fiber shape of CNTs is similar to asbestos fibers. This raises the idea that widespread use of carbon nanotubes may lead to pleural mesothelioma, a cancer of the lining of the lungs, or peritoneal mesothelioma, a cancer of the lining of the abdomen (both caused by exposure to asbestos). A recently published pilot study supports this prediction. Scientists exposed the mesothelial lining of the body cavity of mice to long multiwalled carbon nanotubes and observed asbestos-like, length-dependent, pathogenic behavior that included inflammation and formation of lesions known as granulomas. Authors of the study conclude:

This is of considerable importance, because research and business communities continue to invest heavily in carbon nanotubes for a wide range of products under the assumption that they are no more hazardous than graphite. Our results suggest the need for further research and great caution before introducing such products into the market if long-term harm is to be avoided.

Although further research is required, the available data suggest that under certain conditions, especially those involving chronic exposure, carbon nanotubes can pose a serious risk to human health.

==== Exposure Characterization ====
Exposure scenarios are important to consider when trying to determine toxicity and the risks associated with these diverse and difficult to study materials. Exposure studies have been conducted over the past several years in an effort to determine where and how likely exposures will be. Since CNTs are being incorporated into composite materials for their ability to strengthen materials while not adding significant weight, the manufacture of CNTs and composites or hybrids including CNTs, the subsequent processing of the articles and equipment made from the composites, and end of life processes such as recycling or incineration all represent potential sources of exposure. The potential for exposure to the end user is not as likely, however as CNTs are being incorporated into new products there may be more research needed.

One study performed personal and area sampling at seven different plants mostly involving the manufacture of MWCNTs. This study found that the work processes that prompt nanoparticle, not necessarily just CNT release, include "spraying, CNT preparation, ultrasonic dispersion, wafer heating, and opening the water bath cover." The exposure concentrations for both personal and area sampling indicated most workers' exposure was well below that set by the ACGIH for carbon black.

Processing composite materials presents potential for exposure during cutting, drilling, or abrasion. Two different composite types were laboratory tested during processing under differing conditions to determine potential releases. Samples were machined using one dry cutting process and one wet cutting process with measurements taken at the source and in the breathing zone. The composites tested varied by method of manufacture and components. One was graphite and epoxy layered with CNTs aligned within and the other was a woven alumina with aligned CNTs on the surface. Dry cutting of both proved to be of concern regarding concentrations measured at the breathing zone, while wet cutting, a preferred method, showed a much better method of controlling potential exposures during this type of processing.

Another study provided breathing zone and area sampling results from fourteen sites working with CNTs in a variety of manners for potential exposure assessment. These sites included the manufacture of CNTs, hybrid producers/users, and secondary manufacturers in either the electronics industry or composites industry. The highest mean exposures found in breathing zone samples were found in the secondary manufactures of electronics, then composites and hybrid sites, while the lowest mean exposures were found at the primary manufacturers sites. Relatively few of the samples returned results higher than the recommended exposure level as published by NIOSH.

While there are developing strategies for the use of CNTs in a variety of products, potentials for exposures thus far appear to be low in most occupational settings. This may change as new products and manufacturing methods or secondary processing advances; therefore risk assessments should be integral to any planning for new applications.

=== Epidemiology and Risk Management ===
==== Summary of Epidemiology Studies ====
Currently, there is a lack of epidemiological evidence linking exposure to CNT to human health effects. To date, there have been only a handful of published epidemiological studies that have solely examined the health effects related to the exposure of CNT, while several other studies are currently underway and yet to be published. With the limited amount of human data, scientists are more reliant on the results of current animal toxicity studies to predict adverse health effects, as well as applying what is already known about exposures to other fibrous materials such as asbestos or fine and ultra-fine particulates. This limitation of human data has led to the use of the precautionary principle, which urges workplaces to limit exposure levels to CNT as low as possibly achievable in the absence of known health effects data.

Epidemiology studies of nanomaterials thus far have considered a variety of nanomaterials. Few have been specific to CNTs and each has considered a small sample size. These studies have found some relationships between biological markers and MWCNT exposure. One cross-sectional study to evaluate health effects was conducted to determine associations of biomarkers in relation to measured CNT exposure. While no effect on lung function due to exposure was found, the study did observe some indications of early signs of effects to biomarkers associated with exposure to MWCNTs. Additionally, some results were contradictory to earlier in vitro studies making further studies necessary to further define effects.

==== NIOSH Risk Assessment Summary ====
NIOSH has undertaken a risk assessment based on available studies to determine appropriate recommendations of exposure levels. Their review found that while human health effects had not been directly observed, there were animal studies that showed potential for health effects that could reasonably be expected in humans upon sufficient exposure. In addition to animal studies, human cell studies were reviewed and determined that harmful effects were expressed. Ultimately, the risk assessment found the most relevant data upon which to calculate the REL (recommended exposure limit) were animal studies. Corrections for inter-species differences, and updates to reflect advancing technologies in sampling methods and detection capabilities were considered as a part of the risk assessment. The resultant REL is several orders of magnitude smaller than those of other carbonaceous particulate matters of concern, graphite and carbon black.

==== Risk Management ====
To date, several international government agencies, as well as individual authors, have developed occupational exposure limits (OEL) to reduce the risk of any possible human health effects associated with workplace exposures to CNT. The National Institute for Occupational Safety and Health (NIOSH) conducted a risk assessment using animal and other toxicological data relevant to assessing the potential non-malignant adverse respiratory effects of CNT and proposed an OEL of 1 μg/m^{3} elemental carbon as a respirable mass 8-hour time-weighted average (TWA) concentration. Several individual authors have also performed similar risk assessments using animal toxicity data and have established inhalation exposure limits ranging from 2.5 to 50 ug/m^{3}. One such risk assessment used two data from two different types of exposures to work toward an OEL as part of an adaptive management where there is an expectation that recommendations will be reevaluated as more data become available.

=== Safety and Exposure Prevention ===
Occupational exposures that could potentially allow the inhalation of CNT is of the greatest concern, especially in situations where the CNT is handled in powder form which can easily be aerosolized and inhaled. Also of concern are any high-energy processes that are applied to various CNT preparations such as the mixing or sonication of CNT in liquids as well as processes that cut or drill into CNT based composites in downstream products. These types of high-energy processes will aerosolize CNT which can then be inhaled.

Guidance for minimizing exposure and risk to CNT have been published by several international agencies which includes several documents from the British Health and Safety Executive titled "Using nanomaterials at work Including carbon nanotubes and other bio-persistent high aspect ratio nanomaterials" and the "Risk Management of Carbon Nanotubes" Safe Work Australia has also published guidance titled "Safe Handling and use of Carbon Nanotubes" which describes two approaches to managing the risks that include risk management with detailed hazard analysis and exposure assessment as well as risk management by using Control Banding. The National Institute for Occupational Safety and Health has also published a document titled "Current Intelligence Bulletin 65: Occupational Exposure to Carbon Nanotubes and Nanofibers" describes strategies for controlling workplace exposures and implementing a medical surveillance program. The Occupational Safety and Health Administration has published a "OSHA Fact Sheet, Working Safety with Nanomaterials" for use as guidance in addition to a webpage hosting a variety of resources.

These guidance documents generally advocate instituting the principles of the Hierarchy of Hazard Control which is a system used in industry to minimize or eliminate exposure to hazards. The hazard controls in the hierarchy are, in order of decreasing effectiveness:

- Elimination of a potential exposure.
- Substitution with a less hazardous chemical or process.
- Engineering Controls such as ventilation systems, shielding, or enclosures.
- Administrative Controls including training, policies, written procedures, work schedules, etc.
- Personal Protective Equipment
