= Smoke bomb =

Type of firework

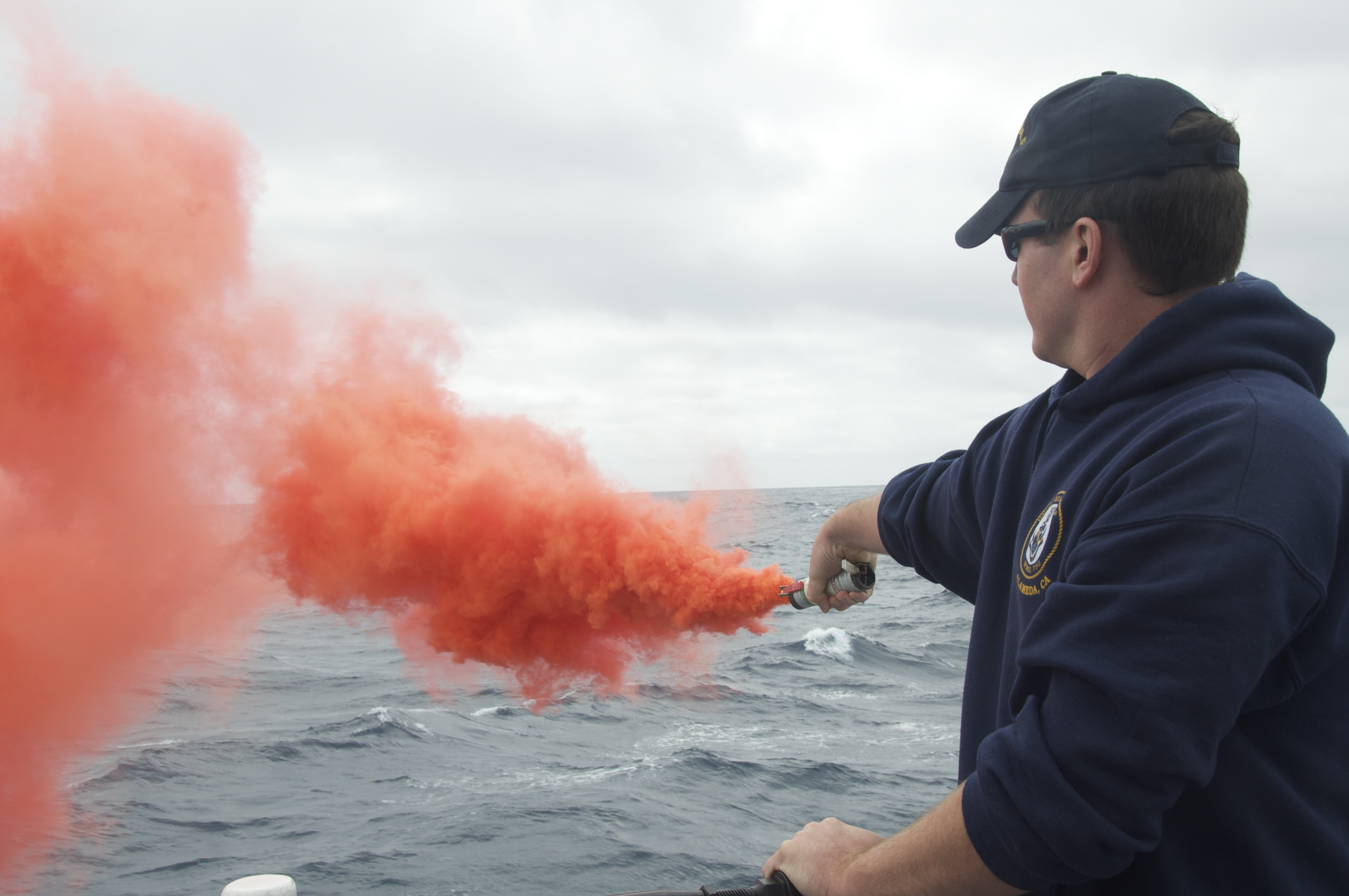
A man holding a lit smoke bomb

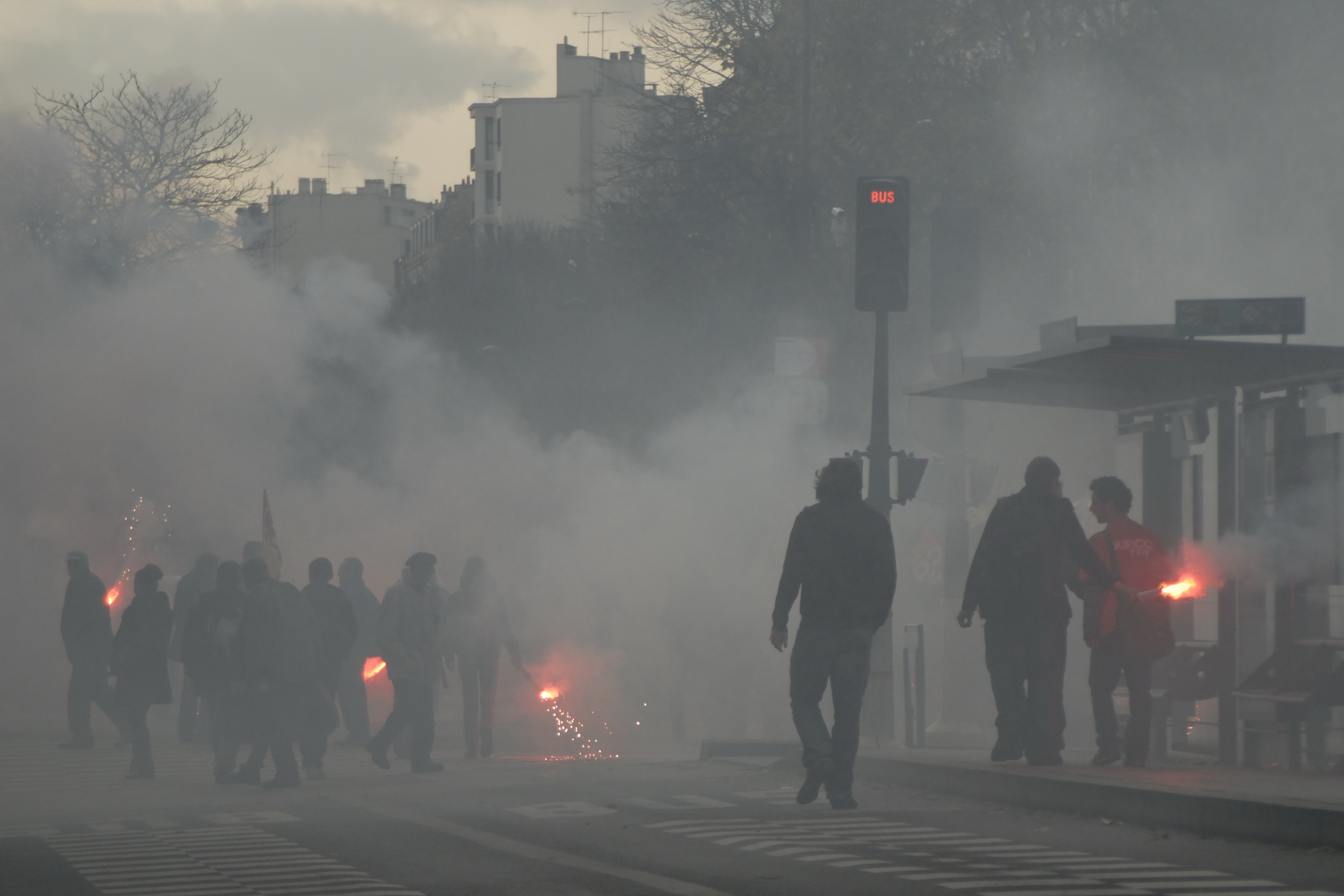
Smoke bomb during the protests in Paris, France (2008)

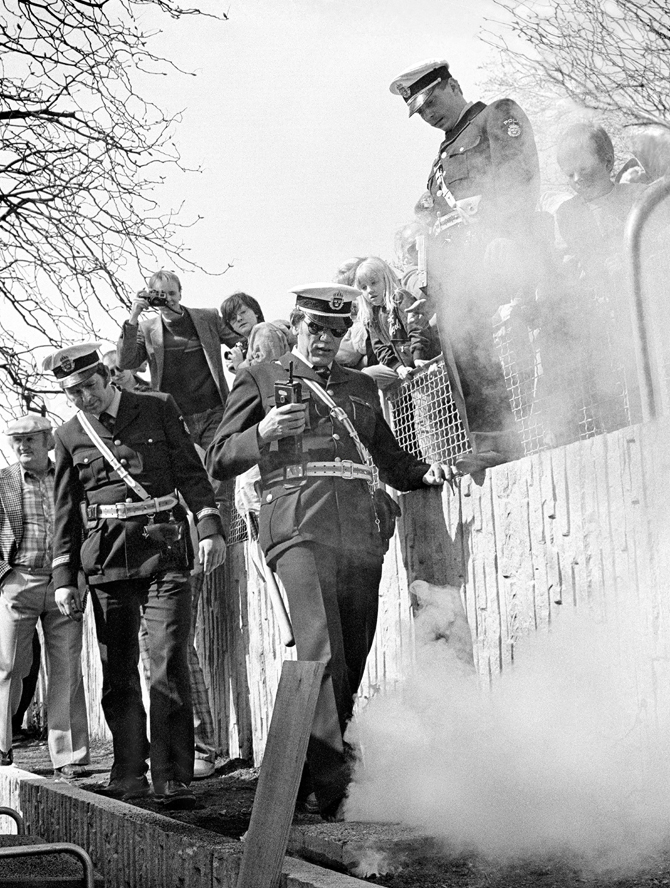
A police officer kicks a smoke bomb in Malmö, Sweden (1985)

A smoke bomb is a firework designed to produce a large amount of smoke upon ignition.

== History ==
Early Japanese history saw the use of a rudimentary form of the smoke bomb. Explosives were common in Japan during the Mongol invasions of the 13th century. Soft cased hand-held bombs were later designed to release smoke, poison gas, and shrapnel made from iron and pottery. The modern smoke bomb was created in 1848, by the British inventor Robert Yale. He developed 17th-century Chinese-style fireworks and later modified the formula to produce more smoke for a longer period.

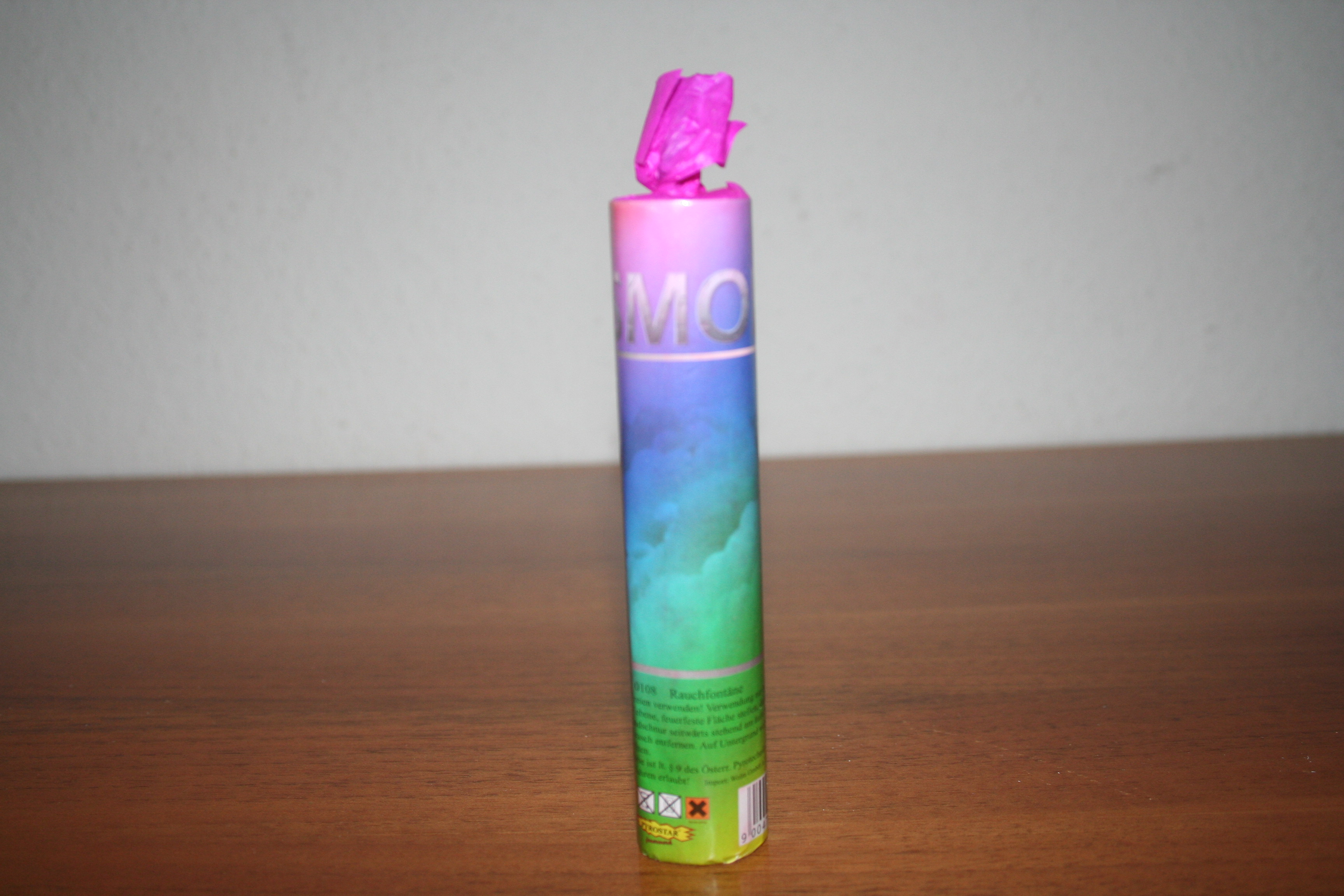
A pyrotechnic smoke bomb

Colored smoke devices use a formula that consists of an oxidizer (typically potassium nitrate, KNO_{3}), a fuel (generally sugar), a moderator (such as sodium bicarbonate) to keep the reaction from getting too hot, and a powdered organic dye. The burning of this mixture boils the dye and forces it out of the device, where it condenses in the atmosphere to form a smoke of finely dispersed particles.

Home-made smoke bombs, even preceding Yale's 1848 invention, were and are most commonly used in pranks and street conflicts. They are typically made from materials that burn poorly and contained in vessels with a limited air intake that inhibit combustion.
