= Toxicokinetics =

Branch of pharmacokinetics

Toxicokinetics (often abbreviated as 'TK') is the description of both what rate a chemical will enter the body and what occurs to excrete and metabolize the compound once it is in the body.

== Relation to pharmacokinetics ==
It is an application of pharmacokinetics to determine the relationship between the systemic exposure of a compound and its toxicity. It is used primarily for establishing relationships between exposures in toxicology experiments in animals and the corresponding exposures in humans. However, it can also be used in environmental risk assessments in order to determine the potential effects of releasing chemicals into the environment. In order to quantify toxic effects, toxicokinetics can be combined with toxicodynamics. Such toxicokinetic-toxicodynamic (TKTD) models are used in ecotoxicology.

Similarly, physiological toxicokinetic models are physiological pharmacokinetic models developed to describe and predict the behavior of a toxicant in an animal body; for example, what parts (compartments) of the body a chemical may tend to enter (e.g. fat, liver, spleen, etc.), and whether or not the chemical is expected to be metabolized or excreted and at what rate.

== Processes ==
Four potential processes exist for a chemical interacting with an animal: absorption, distribution, metabolism and excretion (ADME). Absorption describes the entrance of the chemical into the body, and can occur through the air, water, food, or soil. Once a chemical is inside a body, it can be distributed to other areas of the body through diffusion or other biological processes. At this point, the chemical may undergo metabolism and be biotransformed into other chemicals (metabolites). These metabolites can be less or more toxic than the parent compound. After this potential biotransformation occurs, the metabolites may leave the body, be transformed into other compounds, or continue to be stored in the body compartments.

A well designed toxicokinetic study may involve several different strategies and depends on the scientific question to be answered. Controlled acute and repeated toxicokinetic animal studies are useful to identify a chemical's biological persistence, tissue and whole body half-life, and its potential to bioaccumulate. Toxicokinetic profiles can change with increasing exposure duration or dose. Real world environmental exposures generally occur as low level mixtures, such as from air, water, food, or tobacco products. Mixture effects may differ from individual chemical toxicokinetic profiles because of chemical interactions, synergistic, or competitive processes. For other reasons, it is equally important to characterize the toxicokinetics of individual chemicals constituents found in mixtures as information on behavior or fate of the individual chemical can help explain environmental, human, and wildlife biomonitoring studies.
