= Inhalation exposure =

Route of exposure to pollutants

Inhalation is a major route of exposure that occurs when an individual breathes in polluted air which enters the respiratory tract. Identification of the pollutant uptake by the respiratory system can determine how the resulting exposure contributes to the dose. In this way, the mechanism of pollutant uptake by the respiratory system can be used to predict potential health impacts within the human population.

== Definition ==
Exposure is commonly understood to be the concentration of the airborne pollutant in the air at the mouth and nose boundary. Outdoor concentrations are often measured at fixed sites or estimated with models. The fraction of this ambient concentration that is inhaled by a person depends mainly on their location (indoor or outdoor), distance to pollution sources and their minute ventilation. Traditionally exposure is estimated based on outdoor concentrations at the residential address. Trips to other locations and physical activity level are mostly neglected although some recent studies have attempted to use portable and wearable sensors.

Intake dose is the mass of the pollutant that crosses the contact boundary and is inhaled by the individual. Some of this pollutant is exhaled, and the fraction that is absorbed by the respiratory system is known as the absorbed dose. A portion of the pollutant may also be expelled by sneezing, coughing, spitting, or swallowing. The remaining pollutant that is transported through the liquid layer, making contact with the respiratory tract tissues is the fraction of bioavailability, called the effective dose.

== Major pollutants of concern ==
In 1970, the Clean Air Act Amendments set six criteria air pollutants which are updated periodically by the National Ambient Air Quality Standards (NAAQS) and the U.S. Environmental Protection Agency (USEPA). The six criteria pollutants were identified based on scientific knowledge of health effects caused by the pollutants. The six criteria are the following: particulate matter (PM), nitrogen oxide NO_{2}, ozone O_{3}, sulfur dioxide SO_{2}, carbon monoxide (CO), and nonmethane hydrocarbons (NHMC). Particulate matter (PM) is divided into two sizes, PM_{10} which is called inhalable PM, and PM_{2.5}, which is called fine PM.

== Uptake of gaseous pollutants ==

The diffusion of O_{2} from the air in the lungs to the bloodstream, and diffusion of CO_{2} from the bloodstream back out to the lungs is an essential part of human respiration. The absorption and diffusion of gases is a bidirectional process. Once the gases are absorbed into the mucus or surfactant layer, the dissolved gases can desorb back to the air in the lungs. Gases may diffuse in either direction depending on the concentration gradient between the two layers. Gases may react chemically during transport into the bloodstream.

Estimates of the resistance for gas mucus and tissue in the terminal bronchioles for SO_{2}, O_{2}, and CO show that SO_{2} has the quickest uptake due to its high aqueous solubility and very low resistance of mucus and tissue layers. Ozone and CO, have lower aqueous solubilities and higher resistance to mass transfer. Ozone is the most reactive, reducing mass transfer into tissue and blood. CO has the slowest uptake and the highest resistance into the terminal bronchioles.

Estimates of Resistances (10^10 m^2 Pa sec mol^-1) in the Terminal Bronchioles
	Gas	Mucus	Tissue	Overall
SO_{2}	0.05	0.00015	0.0011	0.05
CO	0.071	16.95	120.5	137.0
O_{3}	0.077	0.91	0.20	1.19

== Uptake of particulate pollutants ==
The deposition of particulate pollutants into the lungs is necessary before the particles can travel through the mucus into the lung tissue. There are four mechanisms of deposition: interception, impaction, gravitational settling, and Brownian diffusion. Interception happens when a particle is removed after brushing up against an obstacle. Impaction happens when the particle collides into the surface of the respiratory tract due to the high inertia. Gravitational settling is influenced by the force of gravity which causes the particle to settle on the respiratory tract. Brownian motion causes the random collision of gas molecules against the particle, until the particle goes into the respiratory tract.

Prediction of the location of particle deposition into the respiratory tract depends on the size and type of particle. Coarse particles, originating from natural sources such as dust, sand and gravel, tend to deposit in the nasal-pharyngeal region. Fine particles, derived from anthropogenic sources such as fossil fuels and smoking, typically deposit in the pulmonary region. Most gas exchange occurs in the pulmonary region due to the alveoli, which contain a large surface area.

== Health impacts of particulate pollutants ==
Scientists have identified a positive correlation between particulate matter concentrations being the causative factor of respiratory and cardiovascular disease. Particulate matter may also be responsible for as many as 20,000 deaths annually, and exacerbation of asthma. Quantification of dose, determining total number of particles deposited in the pulmonary region, surface area of particles, acidity of particles, and shape are important in determining health impacts. A larger surface area will cause more toxins to be available for absorption into the mucus. Particles such as asbestos have the ability to become permanently enlodged into the alveoli causing cancer in some cases.

Soluble particulate matter can be highly detrimental to the respirator tract because of their ability to dissolve into the mucus or surfactant layer. This can irritate tissues by changing pH, and transport into the rest of the body or gastrointestinal tract. Insoluble PM, such as lead particles, deposit in the nasal-pharyngeal region and can be cleared by blowing, sniffling, or spitting. However, swallowing can cause the particles to deposit into th GI tract. Particles in the tracheobronchial region can be cleared by the cilia, which will move particles into the mucus. Insoluble particles that enter the pulmonary region cause swelling of the alveoli, coughing, and shortness of breath.

== Uptake of carbon monoxide ==
Carbon monoxide is a relatively nonreactive gas with limited solubility. High CO levels build up in the pulmonary region over several hours, and equilibrate with inhaled CO concentrations. Exposure to carbon monoxide is dangerous because of its toxic, odorless nature. Since the gas takes time to build up in the pulmonary region, an inhaled concentration of 600 ppm would cause a headache and reduce mental capacity within an hour, without any other symptoms. Eventually, the substance would induce a coma. Equilibrium of CO in the blood is reached between 6–8 hours of exposure to constant concentration in the air.

A baseline level of carboxyhemoglobin, (COHb) is contained in the blood due to small quantities of CO as a by-product in the body. The total amount of COHb present within the body is equivalent to the COHb baseline level in addition to the COHb exogenous level.

[COHb] total = [COHb] bas + [COHb] exo

== Control Methods for Inhalation Exposure ==
Methods of reducing exposure to inhalation risks can be summarized with the Hierarchy of Controls created by the Nation Institute for Occupational Safety and Health (NIOSH).This system includes 5 steps; Elimination, Substitution, Engineering Controls, Administrative Controls, and Personal Protective Equipment. In this order, they correspond to their effectiveness with Elimination being the most effective and Personal Protective Equipment being the least effective.

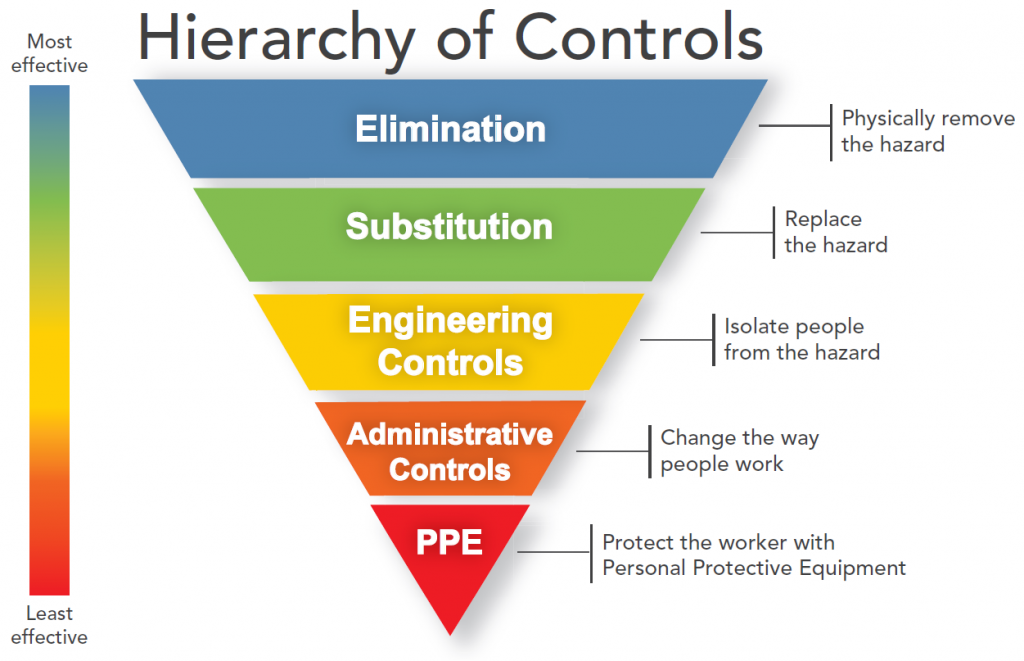
An image of the NIOSH Hierarchy of Controls.

To summarize each element:

Elimination: Removes the hazard altogether.

Substitution: Replacing the hazard with a different one of a less hazardous nature.

Engineering Controls: Methods employed to isolate the hazard from the workers of individuals nearby.

Administrative Controls: Altering how the work is done to reduce exposure amount, time, severity, etc.

Personal Protective Equipment: The garments and clothing items worn to protect against direct exposure.

Each of these control methods can be employed to limit Inhalation exposure to chemicals and particles in various ways. Seen below are a few common methods. An important note with the following is that there are many other methods, strategies, systems, etc. that can be utilized across various industries and workplaces that may not be listed.

Elimination can be applied to inhalation exposures by simply removing the source of the pollutant gases. An example of this can be seen when any type of vehicle is "removed" altogether from a workplace to rid the area of pollutant gas production from burning fossil fuels.

Substitution can be applied by replacing the source of pollutant gases with ones that produce fewer or less harmful by-products. An example of this can be seen when Electric vehicles are used to "replace" their fossil-fuel-burning counterparts in the workplace.

Engineering Controls can be seen with "tools and equipment" being installed and implemented to remove harmful products created by various processes. This can be done with fume extraction systems installed to pull out pollutant gases from the atmosphere. This is often coupled with a system that supplies fresh air into the environment.

Administrative Controls can be employed to reduce inhalation exposure often through methods to have workers only perform their tasks in a certain way. Oftentimes this is done through education and training that is provided to the workers/employees.

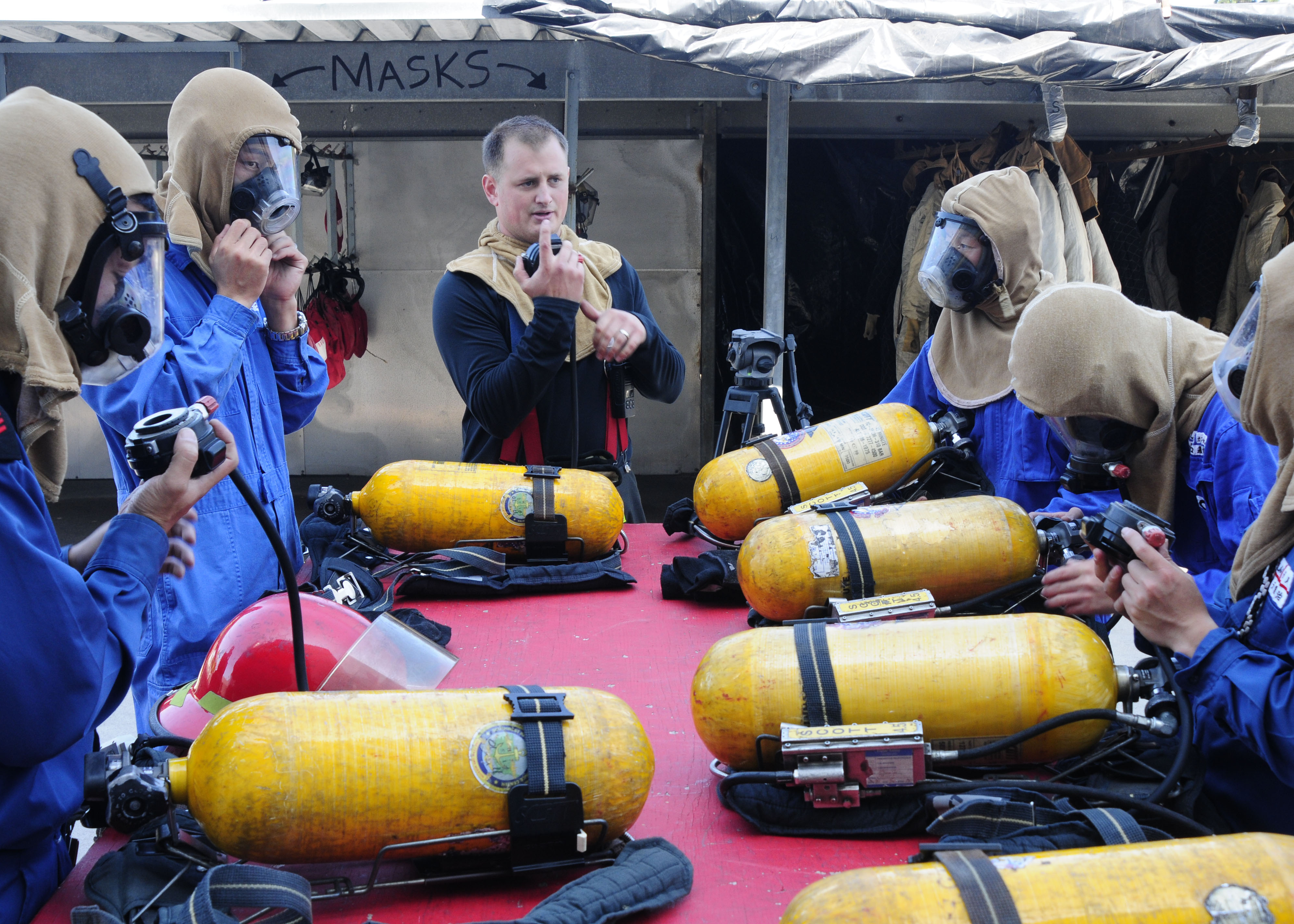
An image of Self-Contained Breathing Apparatus (SCBA) training.

Personal Protective Equipment can be utilized through "items being worn" like gloves, special clothing, and a self-contained breathing apparatus (SCBA).

== Immediately dangerous to life and health atmospheres ==
IDLH atmospheres occur where the contamination of pollutant gases creates an environment where individuals would be severely injured or killed without proper respiratory protection. Pollutant gases that harm the respiratory system, like CO (Carbon Monoxide), CO_{2} (Carbon Dioxide), and HCN (Hydrogen Cyanide), among many others can create potentially lethal environments in the right concentrations. All pollutant gasses have their unique characteristics in terms of IDLH concentrations, side effects, and carcinogenic nature, among other traits. Oftentimes IDLH atmospheres have a lack of oxygen needed to support human life. This often occurs due to asphyxiant gases like CO_{2} displacing the oxygen out of the surroundings below a level that can be safely inhaled by an individual.

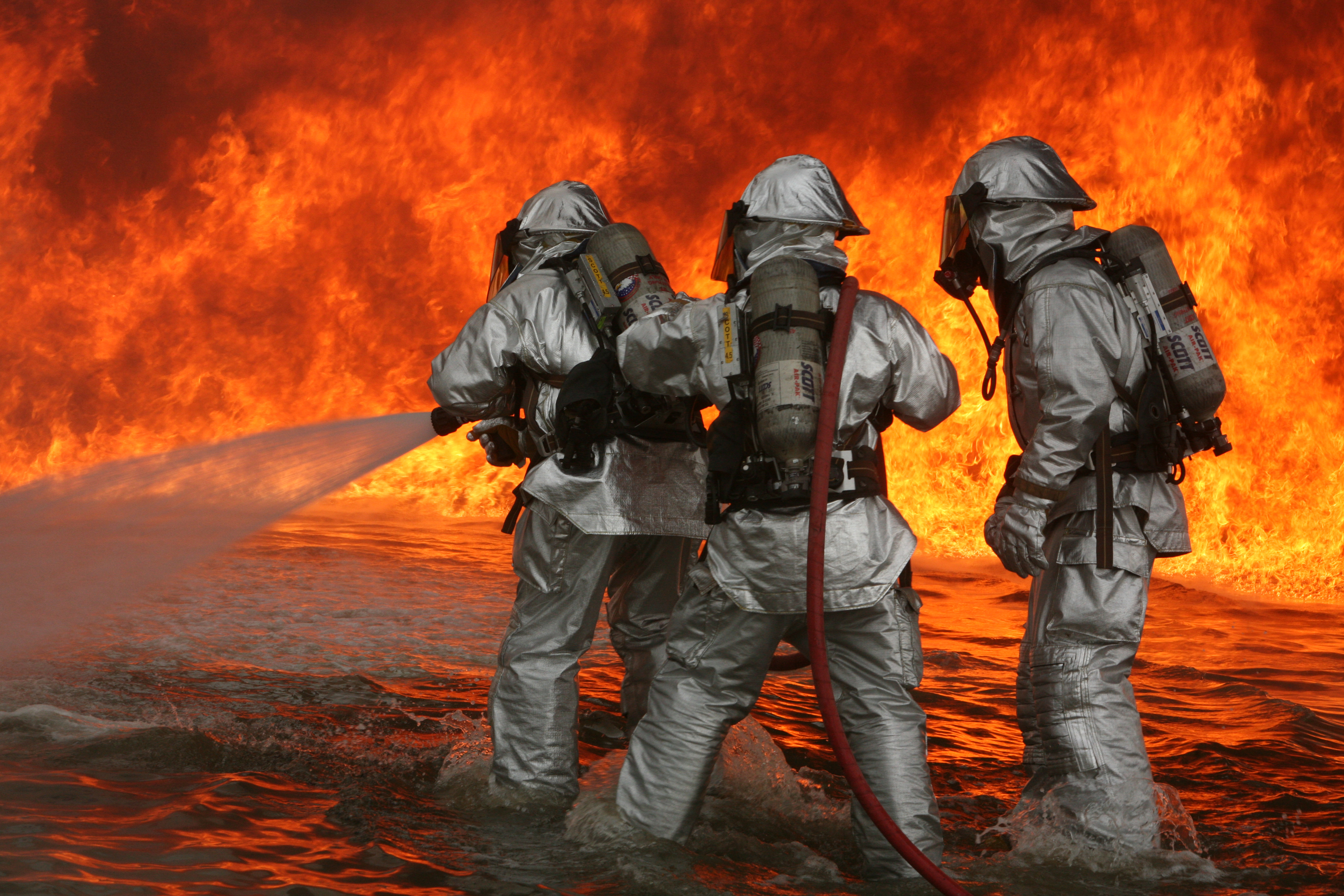
Firefighters wearing Self-Contained Breathing Apparatus near a fire.

Due to the extremely hazardous nature of IDLH environments, they are often avoided in as many ways as possible. Unfortunately, IDLH atmospheres can be created in a variety of ways with many types of chemicals and pollutant gases. This has led many organizations and agencies, most notably fire departments and fire service personnel to adopt Self-Contained Breathing Apparatus for safely working in these atmospheres.

Concentrations of IDLH atmospheres are measured in parts per million (ppm). Parts Per Million details how much of the chemical is needed as a ratio to air to create an IDLH atmosphere. For example, a 4 ppm IDLH value means that only 4 gallons of the chemical to 1,000,000 gallons of air is needed to create an atmosphere that is IDLH. Lower IDLH ppm values correspond to a lower amount of the chemical needed to create an IDLH atmosphere. Conversely, a higher IDLH ppm value corresponds to a higher amount of the chemical needed to create an IDLH atmosphere. Any amount of these chemicals at or above these IDLH values creates an environment that is unsuited for human survivability, or Immediately Dangerous to Life and Health (IDLH). These values can vary greatly depending on the chemical(s) involved and their characteristics. For example, Tellurium hexafluoride has an IDLH value of just 1ppm whereas Methyl alcohol has an IDLH value of 6,000ppm. In other words, Methyl alcohol is 6,000 times less potent than Tellurium hexafluoride as 6,000 times more is needed to create an IDLH atmosphere.

== Confined spaces ==
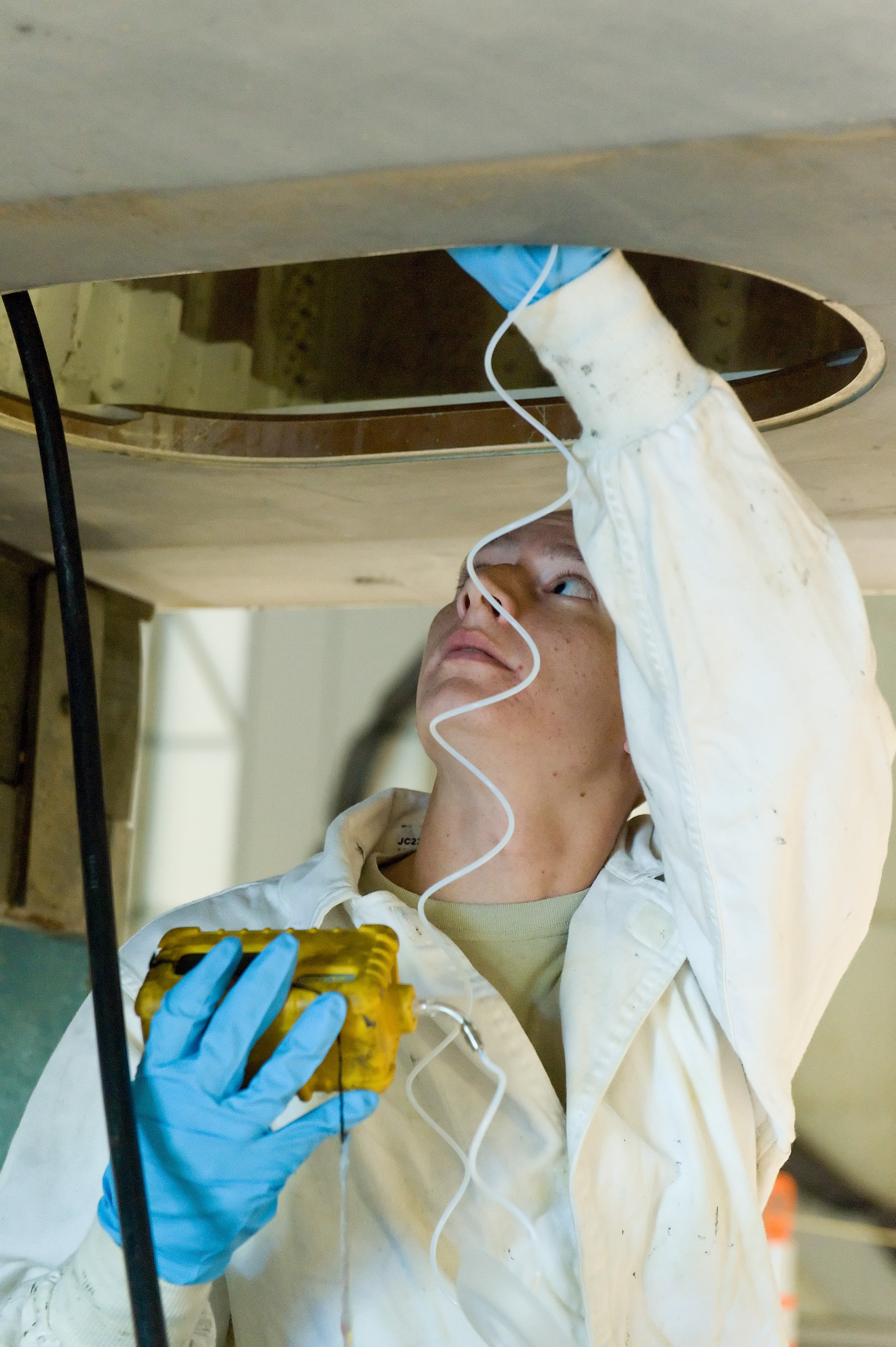
An image of a worker using an atmospheric monitor before entering a confined space.

A confined space is an area that has restricted means of egress and is not constructed to support occupancy. Due to this, they require permits for workers to perform tasks within them. The small, ventilation-deprived nature of these areas often creates a buildup of gases within them. Oftentimes, these are gases that are more dense than air and naturally settle out into low-lying areas. These include but are not limited to, propane, hydrogen sulfide, sulfur dioxide, and carbon dioxide. Even though often more dense gases settle into these areas, lighter gases like methane (often found in sewers) can collect in these areas as well.

Due to the potential buildup of these gases, fresh air is often pumped into the area to help force out these gases from a piece of equipment placed outside. With this, atmospheric monitoring systems are often employed to help better understand oxygen concentrations and toxic or poisonous gas exposure. These systems help workers determine the needed amount of Personal Protective Equipment or other control methods needed to mitigate exposure.

Confined spaces come in many varieties. As mentioned previously, any area with restricted means of egress and is not intended to support occupancy can be a confined space. This includes areas like sewers, silos, hoppers, storage bins, and tunnels.

== Carcinogenic gases ==
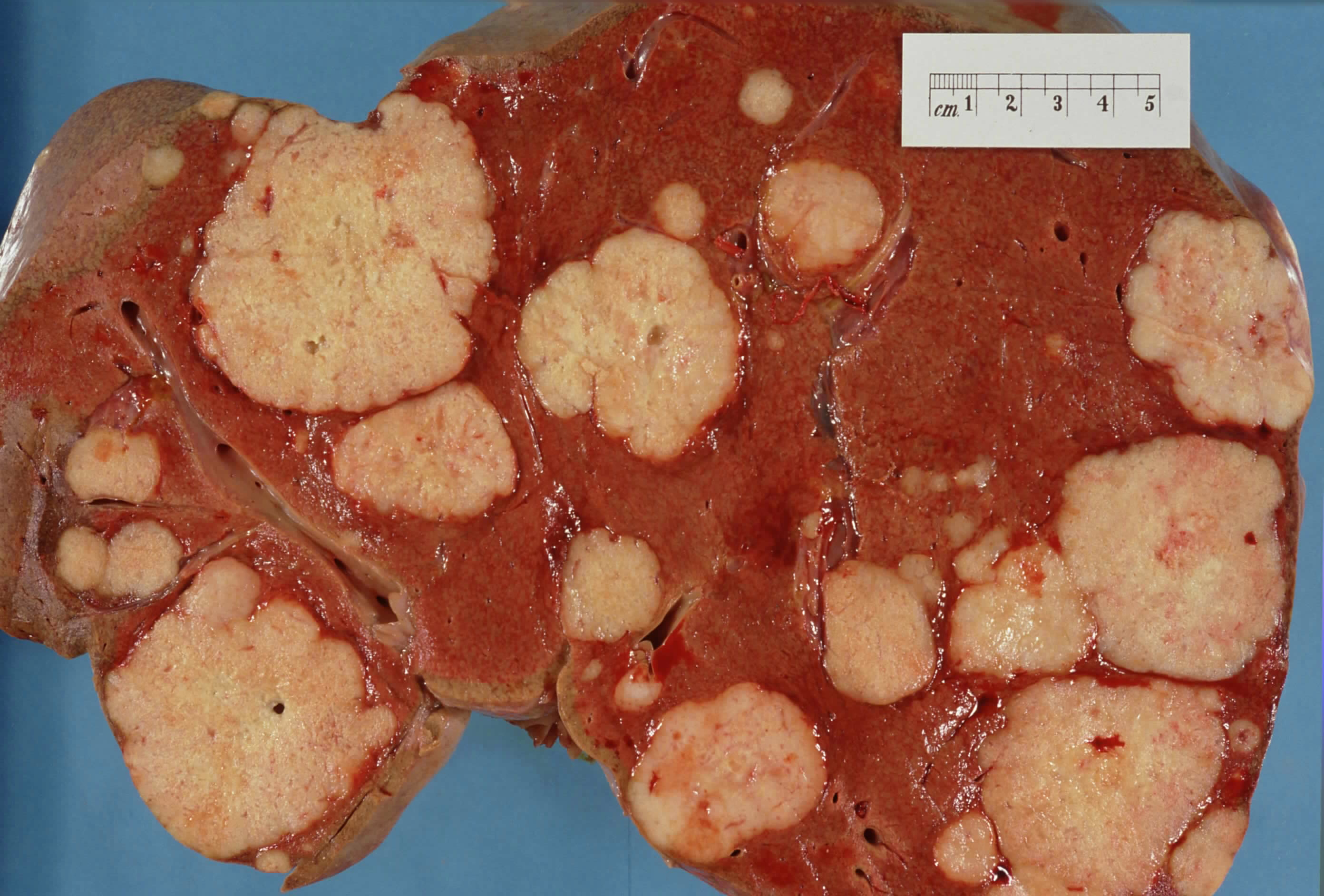
An image of liver cancer.

These pollutant gases can generally be described as gases and chemicals that can lead to cancer or other chronic health effects when individuals are exposed to them. Common carcinogenic pollutants include formaldehyde, carbon tetrachloride, acetaldehyde, benzene, 1,3-butadiene, naphthalene, arsenic compounds, chromium compounds, PAHPOM, and tetrachlorethylene, among others. These chemicals can cause cancers in maxillofacial structures, the respiratory system, and/or the liver. Like with all chemicals and gases, the amount of exposure is important to understand the hazards of them. Some chemicals have severe carcinogenic properties even at quick, very low concentrations while others require frequent and intense exposure to observe cancer-related issues. Regardless of carcinogenic chemicals, proper research should be observed in accordance with regulations to limit exposure.

== Inhalation exposure regulation and research ==
The cover of a respiratory protection booklet made by the North Carolina Department of Labor, Occupational Safety and Health Division.

In the U.S., many levels of government and agencies recognize the severity of pollutant gases, carcinogens, chemical exposure, and the effects they can cause. These groups often pass legislation to eliminate them from consumer products and processes to reduce exposure potential. Some of the agencies that research and/or regulate chemicals include OSHA, NIOSH, and CDC, to name a few along with numerous other state and professional organizations.

The Occupational Safety and Health Administration (OSHA) is a regulatory agency that creates federal-level standards for pollutant gases, among many other health and safety-related topics. They enforce these standards through routine inspections based on the level of severity. Some states within the U.S. have their own OSHA-like agencies, which must exceed the standards of federal OSHA.

The National Institute for Occupational Safety and Health (NIOSH) is an organization that researches and conducts experiments on pollutant gases, likewise among many health and safety-related topics. Unlike OSHA, they are not regulatory and often make recommendations regarding best practices.

The Centers for Disease Control is an organization that works to support communities and citizens with their health and safety regarding diseases of varying levels of severity. While the CDC often works against the spread of diseases like COVID-19, they also work to better understand and mitigate the impacts of air quality and pollution-related issues.

State-run departments of labor are a common source of more localized inhalation-specific regulation. These departments can be often approved by OSHA, provided that these programs exceed the standards set forth by federal OSHA. OSHA-approved state programs exist in 22 states (One of which being the U.S. Territory of Puerto Rico) and they carry out much of the same function regarding inspections, and investigations, and even work in legal matters. These programs come in two main versions. They are; state programs that apply to both Government and Non-government workers, and state programs that solely apply to government workers and workplaces.

The American Lung Association is an organization that specializes in lung disease and respiratory illness. This organization conducts research in addition to education, and advocacy with the various events that they host.

== Safety Data Sheets (U.S.) ==
An image of an MSDS.

Safety Data Sheets (SDS), or Material Safety Data Sheets (MSDS) as they are also known, are documents detailing Health and Safety-Related information regarding a chemical or substance. Among the broad information contained within SDSs are sections about inhalation and respiratory exposure. This information describes first-aid measures, control parameters (ppm exposure limits), personal protective equipment, side effects of exposure, and ecological information, among other topics. The "First Aid Measures" section details what a person affected by the chemical should do to reduce injury or illness from their exposure. The "Control Parameters" section details the exposure limits, often in ppm, of how much a person can be exposed to before they experience injury or illness. The "Personal Protective Equipment" (PPE) section describes what garments should be worn to mitigate exposure to the chemical. The "Toxicological" or "Additional Information" sections detail side effects that a person would most likely experience from exposure. The last section relevant to inhalation exposure is that of "Ecological Information", which details how the chemical affects the environment. Due to the diverse nature of chemicals, the depth and scope of these sections can vary greatly.

== Hazard Communication ==
SDS documents must conform to OSHA's Hazard Communication Standard 29 CFR 1910.1200. This standard was created by OSHA as a way to inform workers about the presence of materials and how the workers should interact with them. Aimed at potentially hazardous materials and chemicals, the standard applies to gases as well. In the past, (When they were employed) hazard communication was often kept out of sight and with high-level employees, away from those immediately affected by them. Communicating the hazards of gases helps to reduce possible confusion regarding the needs and proper practices about them. This helps to involve the workers in the safety process by providing them with information. By communicating the hazards of gases present with as many people as possible, the severity and complexity of potential incidents are reduced. These documents are kept in a binder on-site to make them accessible to all workers who want/need to read their content.
