= Smoke testing (mechanical) =

Technique for detecting leaks

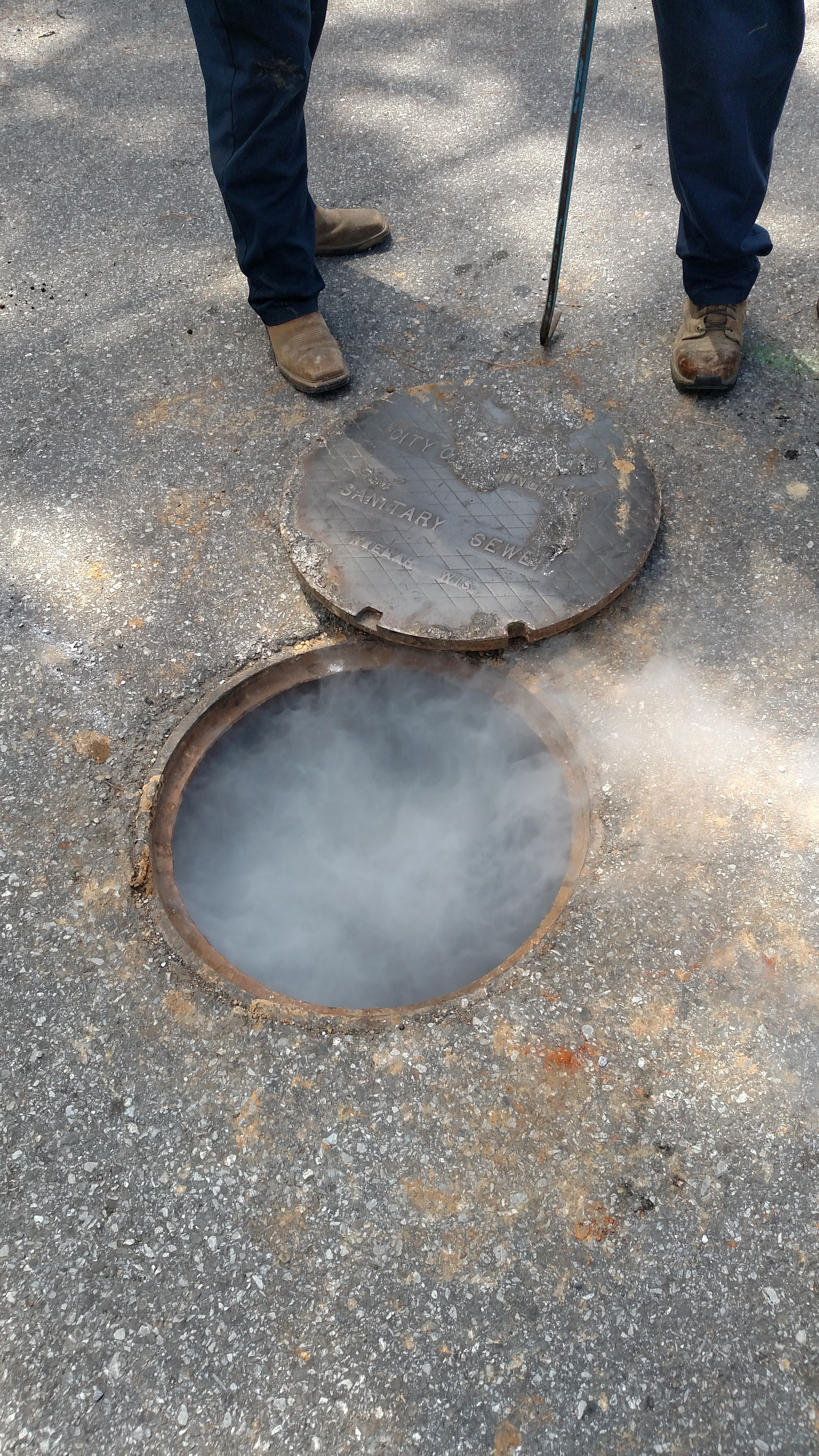
A sanitary sewer manhole in Springdale, Arkansas with smoke coming out as a result of smoke testing for leaks

Smoke testing refers to various classes of tests of systems, usually intended to determine whether they are ready for more robust testing. The expression probably was first used in plumbing in referring to tests for the detection of cracks, leaks or breaks in closed systems of pipes.

Pre-dating the term itself, smoke tests were performed to detect leaks in wooden sailing vessels at least as early as 1836. After making a slow fire in the bottom of the hold, Richard Henry Dana writes, "Wherever smoke was seen coming out we calked and pasted and, so far as we could, make the ship smoke tight."

== History of the term ==
The plumbing industry started using the smoke test in 1875.

== Smoke testing in various industries ==
=== Plumbing ===
In plumbing a smoke test forces non-toxic, artificially created smoke through waste and drain pipes under a slight pressure to find leaks. Plumes of smoke form where there are defects. This test can be performed when the plumbing is brand new, but more often it is used to find sewer gas leaks that may plague a building or an area. Any sign of smoke escaping can be considered a possible site for sewer gas to escape. Sewer gas typically has a rotten egg smell and can contain methane gas, which is explosive, or hydrogen sulfide gas, which is deadly.

Plumbing smoke tests are also used to find places where pipes will spill fluid, and to check sanitary sewer systems for places where ground water and storm runoff can enter. Smoke testing is particularly useful in places such as ventilated sanitary sewer systems, where completely sealing the system is not practical.

When smoke testing a sanitary sewer system it is helpful to partially block off the section of sewer to be tested. This can be done by using a sand bag on the end of a rope. The sand bag is lowered into the manhole and swung into position to partially block lines. Completely blocking the line can cause water to back up and prevent smoke from escaping through defects. Smoke testing may not be done after rain or when ground water is unusually high as this may also prevent detection of defects.

Large downdraft fans, usually powered by gasoline engines, are placed on top of open manholes at either end of the section to be tested. If possible all lines in the manholes except for the line between the manholes are partially blocked. Smoke is created using either a smoke bomb or liquid smoke. Smoke bombs are lit and placed on a grate or in a holder on top of each fan, while liquid smoke is injected into the fan via a heating chamber. The fans create a pressure differential that forces the smoke into the sewer at a pressure just above atmospheric. With properly installed plumbing, the traps will prevent the smoke from entering the house and redirect it out the plumbing vents. Defective plumbing systems or dry traps will allow smoke to enter the inside of the house.

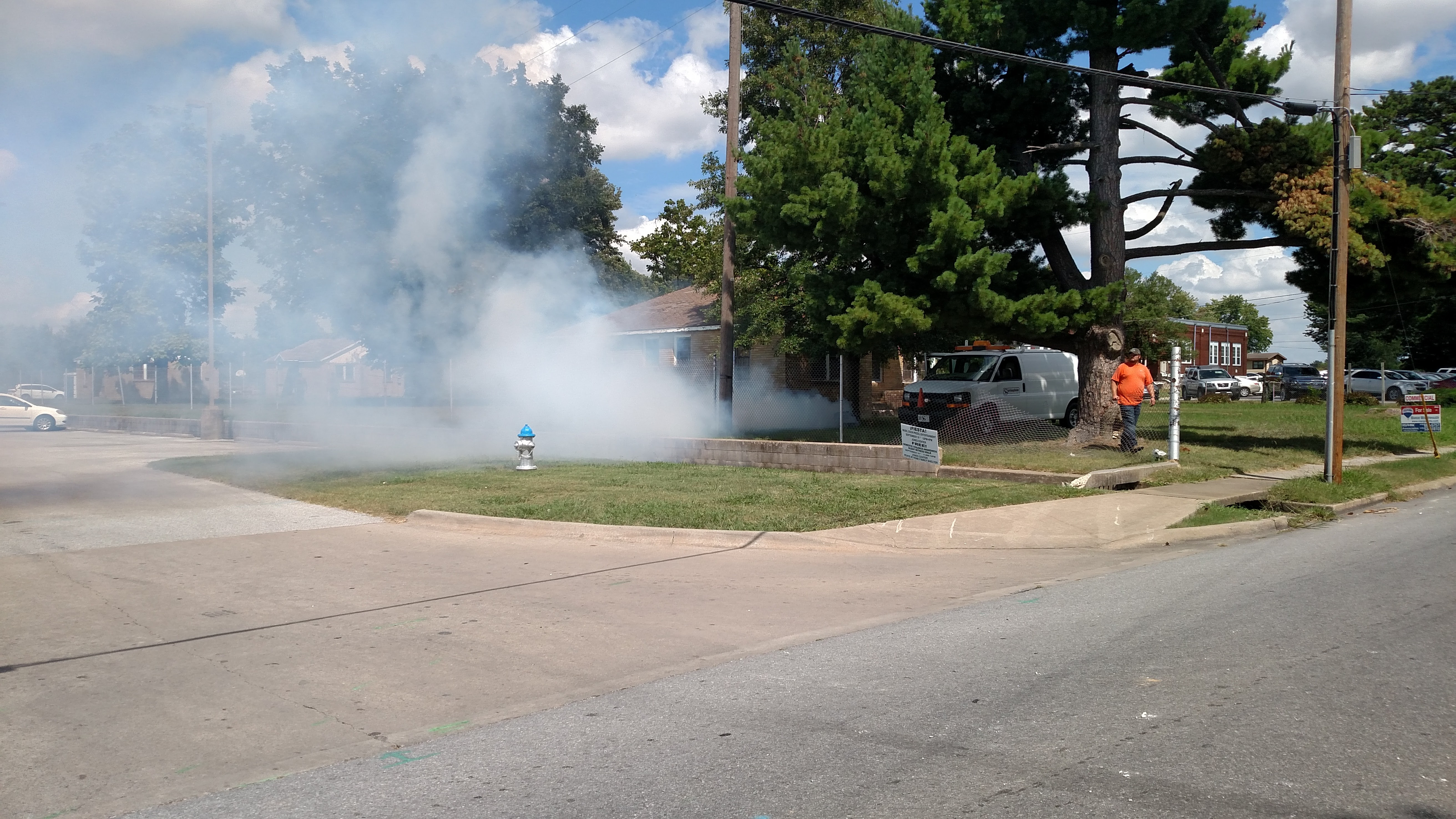
Smoke testing a sanitary sewer produces visible smoke at a residence in Springdale, Arkansas

The area around the section being tested is searched for smoke plumes. Plumes coming from plumbing vents or the interface between the fan shroud and manhole rim are normal; however, smoke plumes outside of the manhole rim are not. Plumes are marked, usually with flags, and defects are noted using measurements from stationary landmarks like the corners of houses. The plumes or markers may also be photographed.

=== Woodwind instrument repair ===
In woodwind instrument repair, a smoke test involved plugging one end of an instrument and blowing tobacco smoke from the tester's mouth into the other to test for leaks. Escaping smoke revealed improperly seated pads and faulty joints (i.e. leaks). After this test the instrument was cleaned to remove nicotine and other deposits left by the smoke.

Described in a repair manual written in the 1930s, smoke testing is considered obsolete, and is no longer used by reputable technicians. The usual alternative to smoke is to place a bright light inside the instrument then check for light appearing around pads and joints.

=== Automotive repair ===
In the same way that plumbing and woodwind instruments are tested, the vacuum systems of automobiles may be tested in order to locate difficult-to-find vacuum leaks. Artificial smoke is deliberately introduced into the system under slight pressure and any leaks are indicated by the escaping smoke. Smoke can also be used to locate difficult-to-find leaks in the fuel evaporative emissions control (EVAP) system.

=== Infectious disease control ===
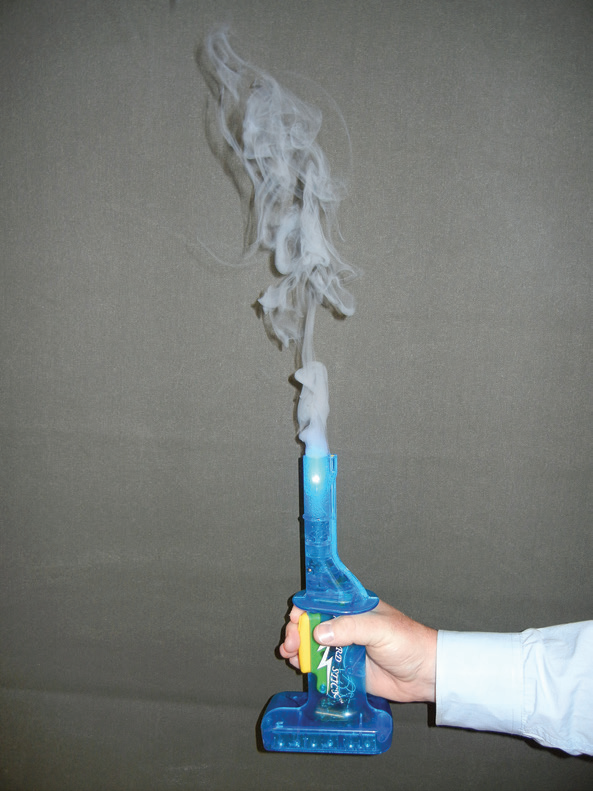
A smoke generator used to visualize air flow. Smoke generators provide a low-cost method to visualize air flow patterns around hazard control measures, including in and around fume hoods and pressure differences between adjacent areas or rooms.

In infectious disease control a smoke test is done to see whether a room is under negative pressure. A tube containing smoke is held near the bottom of the negative pressure room door, about two inches in front of the door. The smoke tube is held parallel to the door, and a small amount of smoke is then generated by gently squeezing the bulb. Care is taken to release the smoke from the tube slowly to ensure the velocity of the smoke from the tube does not overpower the air velocity. If the room is at negative pressure, the smoke will travel under the door and into the room. If the room is not at negative pressure, the smoke will be blown outward or will stay stationary.
