= Foot-and-mouth outbreak =

Foot-and-mouth outbreak may refer to:

- 1967 United Kingdom foot-and-mouth outbreak
- 2001 United Kingdom foot-and-mouth outbreak
- 2007 United Kingdom foot-and-mouth outbreak
- 2010 Japan foot-and-mouth outbreak
- Most recent outbreak in Indonesia
