= South Korea foot-and-mouth outbreak =

2010–2011 animal disease outbreak in South Korea

Location of Andong, South Korea

A serious outbreak of foot-and-mouth disease occurred in South Korea in 2010–2011, leading to the culling of hundreds of thousands of pigs as of January 2011 in an effort to contain it. The outbreak began in November 2010 on pig farms in Andong, North Gyeongsang Province, and rapidly spread throughout the country. More than 100 cases of foot-and-mouth disease have been confirmed in the country, and South Korean officials initiated a mass cull of approximately 12 percent of the entire domestic pig population and 107,000 of the country's three million cattle to halt the outbreak.

As part of the culling process, some English-language media reported that the South Korean government had decided to bury approximately 1.4 million pigs alive, which drew complaints from animal activists. The American animal rights organization People for the Ethical Treatment of Animals started online campaigns, arguing that the animals should be vaccinated rather than buried alive.

Joyce D'Silva, Director of Public Affairs for Compassion in World Farming, stated that they are "appalled" and argued that the practice was contrary to international guidelines on humane culling, which the South Korean government allegedly endorsed. However, local media only reported incidents of swine being buried alive, and a South Korean agriculture ministry official confirmed some incidents but stated that they were few. The official explained that "officials are rushed to stop the spread, and the number of people involved is too small for the operation," and that until a more humane way to cull the infected swine is found, the government would have to resort to burying the infected animals alive because the "government has temporarily run out of euthanasia drugs."

On 12 January 2011, local officials stated that the disease had caused more than US$1 billion worth of livestock losses, including government efforts to halt the spread. According to Kim Jae-hong, a veterinary science professor at Seoul National University, the outbreak is "the most serious in Korea's history," and it is difficult to say when the spread of the disease will be stopped. He also stated that "the most important thing right now is to control movement in and out of the farmhouses that are affected, and thoroughly disinfect the cars around the area."

South Korea's Citizens' Institute for Environmental Studies revealed 32 locations where dead livestock had been buried around 4 drinking water facilities in Gyeonggi Province.

A ProMED-mail post described the epizootic and subsequent cancellations of festivities as being reminiscent of the Britain's February 19, 2001 foot-and-mouth disease outbreak and even more so of the an outbreak in Japan beginning late March 2010, which was caused by the same strain of the virus. In that epizootic, cattle herds were found to be 3.9-4.5 times more susceptible to the virus than pig herds, but pig herds had 5.0-13.6 times greater relative infectiousness. Thus, cattle on infected premises suffered a cumulative incidence of 8.5%, whereas 36.4% of pigs were infected.
