= 2007 United Kingdom foot-and-mouth outbreak =

Epizootic

Coordinates: 51°14′53″N 0°40′28″W

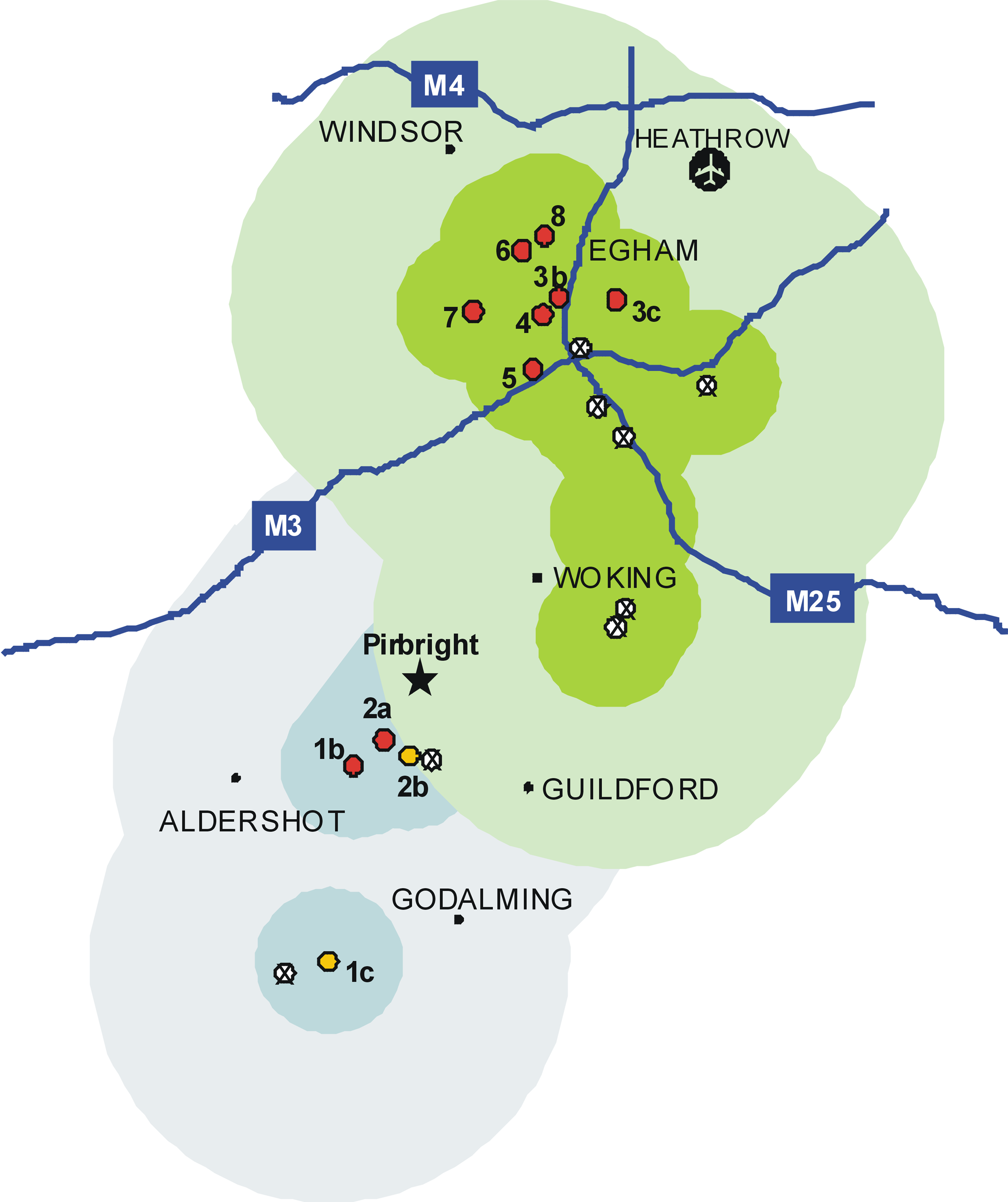
The geographical area affected by foot-and-mouth outbreaks around the Pirbright laboratory sites in 2007.

The 2007 United Kingdom foot-and-mouth outbreak occurred when the discharge of infectious effluent from a laboratory in Surrey led to foot-and-mouth disease (FMD) infections at four nearby farms. The infections were detected via regular livestock testing by the Department for Environment, Food and Rural Affairs (Defra).

The first diagnosis took place in a field of Normandy, Surrey; the second was three days later in a cattle-rotation field of a farm in Elstead, and the following day a third infection was found nearby within a quickly-established protection zone around the first detection. One month and ten days after the first diagnosis a final incidence of 2007 was identified and dealt with 13 miles (21 km) north of the first diseased animal. The source of the strain released and contained in Surrey in 2007 was the advanced effluent pipes from either the Institute for Animal Health or the similar vaccine researching and producing Merial Animal Health laboratory near to Pirbright village in the county. An inspection of the effluent pipes and manholes carried out by Health and Safety Executive investigators showed deficiencies, and the independent investigation of Brian Spratt concluded that it was very likely that they occasionally leaked still-infectious effluent at the time of the outbreak. Both laboratories, either of which may have been the cause, upgraded and repaired their effluent treatment systems to continue operation. The UK government provided compensation for the farmers directly involved.

These interrelated and contained events prompted precautionary measures of restricted-access containment zones in three counties where suspected infections were reported and major international trading partners such as Canada and the Republic of Ireland placed temporary restrictions on meat and dairy exports.

== Background ==
The United Kingdom was affected in 1967 by an outbreak of foot-and-mouth disease. The outbreak was limited to an area on the Welsh border with Shropshire. The subsequent 2001 United Kingdom foot-and-mouth crisis spread more broadly and caused a national crisis for British agriculture and tourism. The epizootic saw 2,000 cases of the disease in farms in most of the British countryside. Livestock farmers' losses and their interest subsequently remained of public interest, and a negative testing in January 2007 in Northern Ireland received BBC local headline coverage.

== Disease outbreak ==
=== Initial reports ===
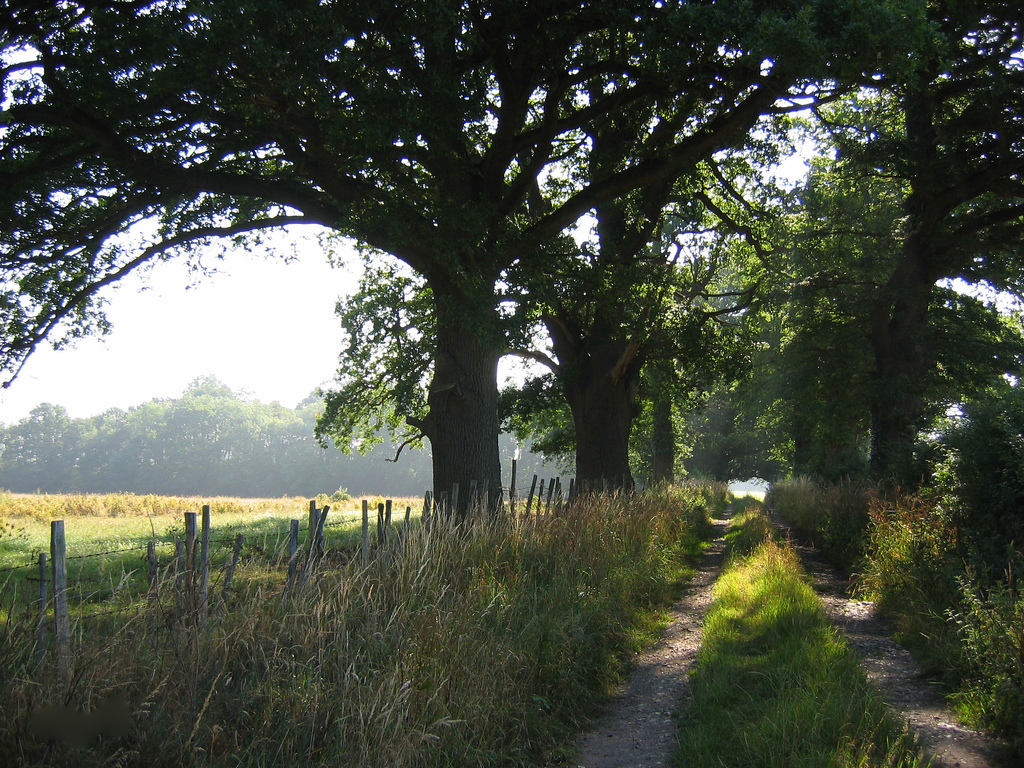
The field in which the infected cattle were grazing immediately before testing positive for foot-and-mouth disease.

Symptoms of foot-and-mouth disease were first reported late on 2 August 2007 on farmland in Normandy in Surrey, which was subsequently isolated and placed under restrictions. The site was a field for beef fattening rented by Derrick and Roger Pride. The following day the Chief Veterinary Officer (CVO) Debby Reynolds confirmed that initial testing revealed that 60 cattle were infected with foot-and-mouth disease and that other potential cases were being investigated.

The virus strain was identified on 4 August as FMDV BFS 1860 O_{1} 1967 (Foot-and-mouth disease virus, British field strain 1860, serotype O, subtype 1, isolated in 1967; also referred to as strain BFS 1860/UK/67). The virus was first isolated during the 1967 foot-and-mouth outbreak and until the 2007 outbreak was not in circulation in animals. It was the same strain as used at the nearby Pirbright laboratory sites that housed separate units of the Institute for Animal Health (IAH) and Merial Animal Health Ltd at Pirbright, 2.5 miles (4.0 km) away.

The Institute of Animal Health at Pirbright carried out research into foot-and-mouth disease as well as other diseases affecting livestock. The Merial Animal Health site was also identified as a possible source of the infection, as they were one of four European laboratories authorised to handle the strain to produce vaccines. The next closest laboratory working with the strain was in Belgium. As a result of the location of the two Pirbright laboratory sites, the isolation zone was extended.

Another protection zone was created on 5 August near Elstead after a cow at one of the two other locations used by the farm tested positive. The herd at both locations had already been slaughtered the previous day as a standard precautionary measure. Another herd the next day within one of the protection zones showing symptoms of FMD was slaughtered on suspicion. Samples underwent analysis and the next day FMD was confirmed on a farm in Surrey within the protection zone. The cows were on land owned by the farmer Lawrence Matthews who rented grazing to a neighbouring producer.

=== Laboratory concerns ===
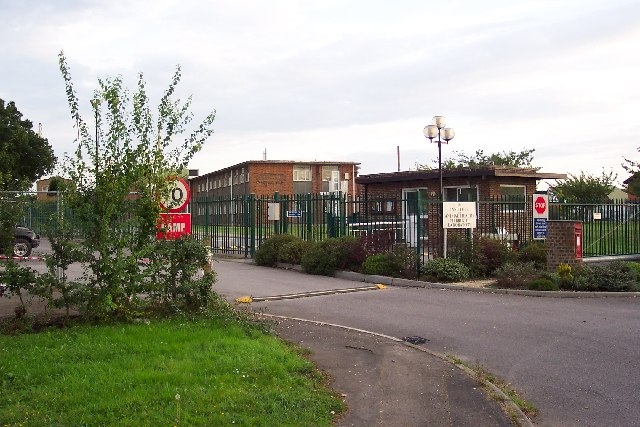
Pirbright Institute, laboratory site at Baker's Gate in 2005.

The Health & Safety Executive (HSE) issued a report on 7 August titled "Initial report on potential breaches to biosecurity at the Pirbright site, 2007" which contained the following comments:

"Subject to the ongoing work detailed above, the indications are that there is a strong probability that the FMDV strain involved in the farm outbreak originated from the IAH or the Merial sites."

"We are further exploring the meteorological data, but at this stage, we consider there to be a negligible combined likelihood that there was an airborne release from the IAH or the Merial sites which was subsequently transferred to the first affected farm between 14 and 25 July 2007."

"Waterborne release onto the site remains a possibility. But preliminary investigations into the possibility of whether surface water from flooding from the site could have reached and contaminated the affected farm have indicated that this was negligible due to the distance, topography and direction of flow. These issues are being investigated further."

"Release by human movement must also be considered a real possibility. Further investigation of the above issues is required and is being urgently pursued."

The Pirbright site has been the source of foot-and-mouth outbreaks before – in 1970 the virus escaped from the experimental area into a holding pen elsewhere on the site. Eighteen animals had to be destroyed.

=== Later cases ===
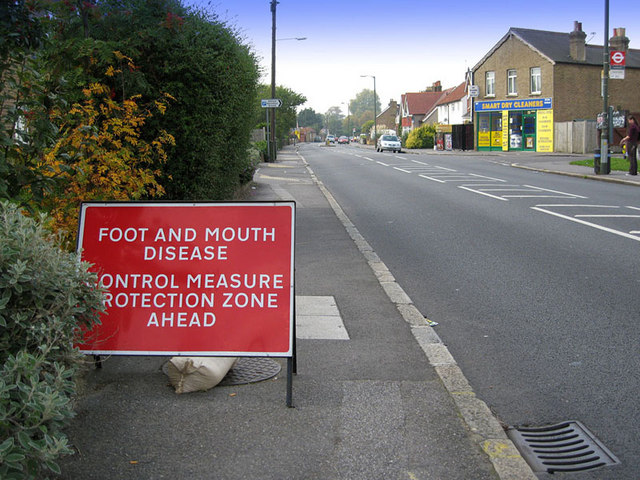
Foot-and-mouth disease protection zone by Ashford, Surrey in 2007.

A farmer who left the land at the site of the initial outbreaks reported on 9 August some of his cows to Defra as a precautionary measure. A 3 km (2 mile) temporary control zone was established, and then removed, on 11 August when negative test results were returned. Three further potential outbreaks were investigated during August, at a farm elsewhere in Surrey; at the Chessington World of Adventures zoo; and at a farm near Romney in Kent. All three tested negative for foot and mouth. Following a lack of further outbreaks since the initial discovery, Defra lifted on 24 August the protection zones around the farms. The surveillance zone was removed on 8 September. A 5 km (3 mile) radius biosecurity area remained in place longer around the Pirbright laboratories.

A new case of foot and mouth was identified on 12 September at Milton Park Farm near Egham in the county, 30 miles (48 km) north of the original case. A 3 km (2 mile) radius protection zone and a 10 km (6 mile) radius surveillance zone was established around the farm. A sick sheep found earlier during the day in Scotland at a Lanarkshire market was later found to be negative. Separately, a temporary control zone was put around a premise in Norfolk as a precautionary measure following a veterinary visit. Laboratory results for these animals were also negative and so the local restrictions were lifted the next evening.

== Precautions ==
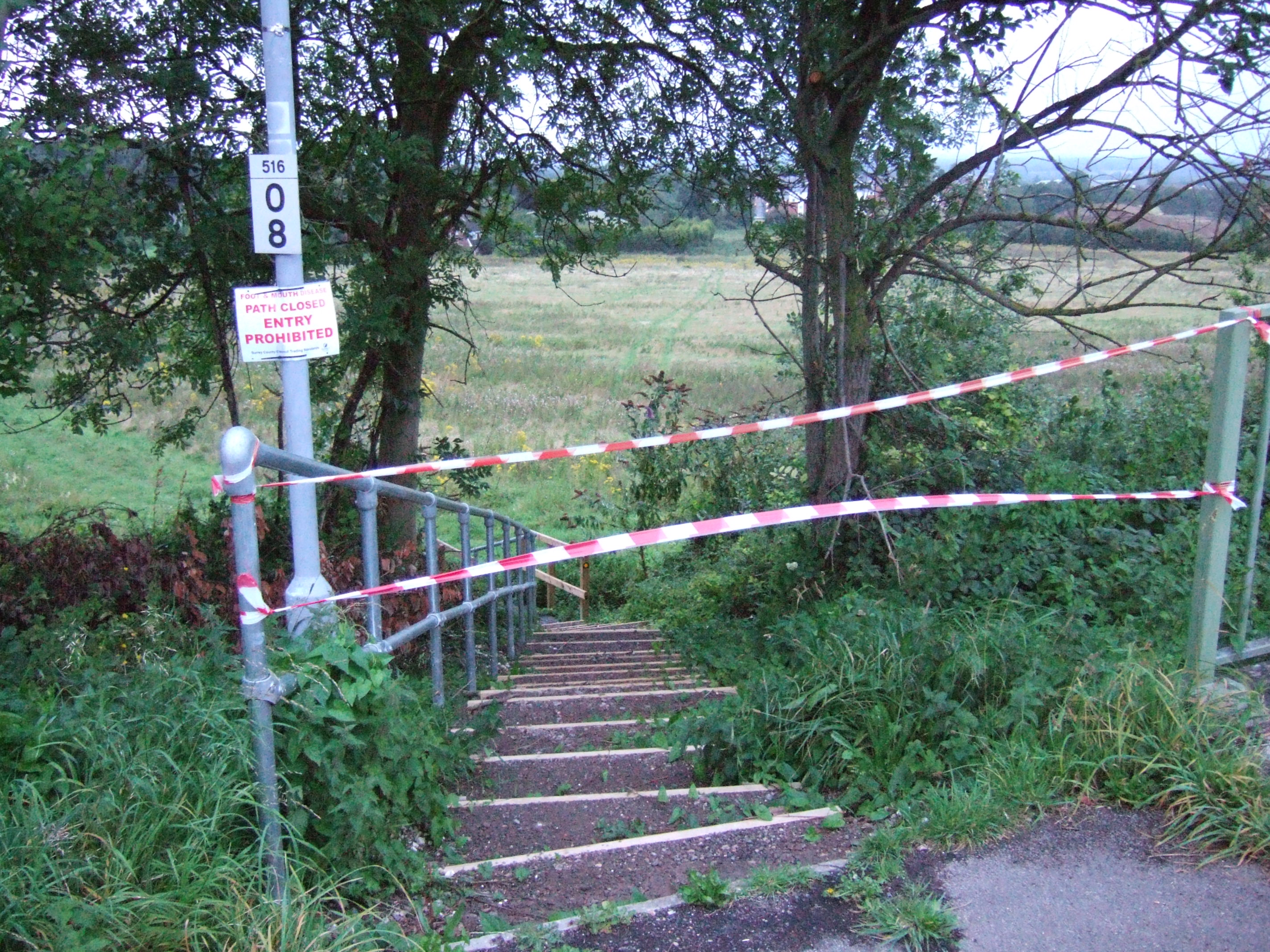
One of the many footpaths closed in an attempt to stop the virus's spread.

All livestock at the three geographically separate locations were destroyed on 4 August. A nationwide ban on the movement of cattle and pigs was imposed, with a 3 km (1.9 mi) protection zone in place around the affected farm and a further 10 km (6.2 mi) zone of cattle surveillance. An 8 km (5.0 mi) aerial exclusion zone was set up around the site.

As required by European Union regulations, all exports of animal and meat products of species affected by the outbreak were halted from the United Kingdom.

A net total of 2160 animals were culled in the affected zones over the 58 day outbreak period (982 cattle, 1128 pigs, 43 sheep and seven goats). The total cost of containment and livestock loss came to a total of £47 million. This compares to a total loss of around £3 billion and the culling of around four million animals (85% sheep, 12% cattle, 3% pigs) during the 2001 outbreak which lasted for 221 days.

== Reaction ==
=== Political reaction ===
The Prime Minister Gordon Brown and Environment Secretary Hilary Benn returned to London early from their holidays. Welsh Minister for Rural Affairs Elin Jones cut short her holiday to New Zealand, and opposition leader David Cameron also cancelled his holiday in Brittany. A COBRA meeting took place shortly before the official announcement, with the Prime Minister participating on a telephone link.

=== Scientific reaction ===
On the prospect of the virus coming from one of the Pirbright establishments, emeritus professor of bacteriology Hugh Pennington said "If we know exactly where the virus has come from, and particularly if it's a vaccine type of virus, it's less likely to be a nasty virus." King, a former head of molecular biology at the IAH, said "As far as I am concerned the authorities have failed to find any chink in the armoury of the establishment’s bio-security. What you are left with is human movement, which is not a matter for the institute, it’s a police matter. It’s very, very unlikely that it could be spread by accident. People do not spread the disease easily."

=== International reaction ===
Following the confirmation of the outbreak, Northern Ireland and the Republic of Ireland closed all of their ports to livestock, fresh meat and non-pasteurised milk imports, and ordered disinfectant measures to be put in place at ports and airports all over the island. Canada blocked the entry of any livestock from the United Kingdom (which included Northern Ireland) into the country, and Japan and the United States blocked the entry of pigs and pig products. British beef was already banned in both of these countries.

== Investigation ==
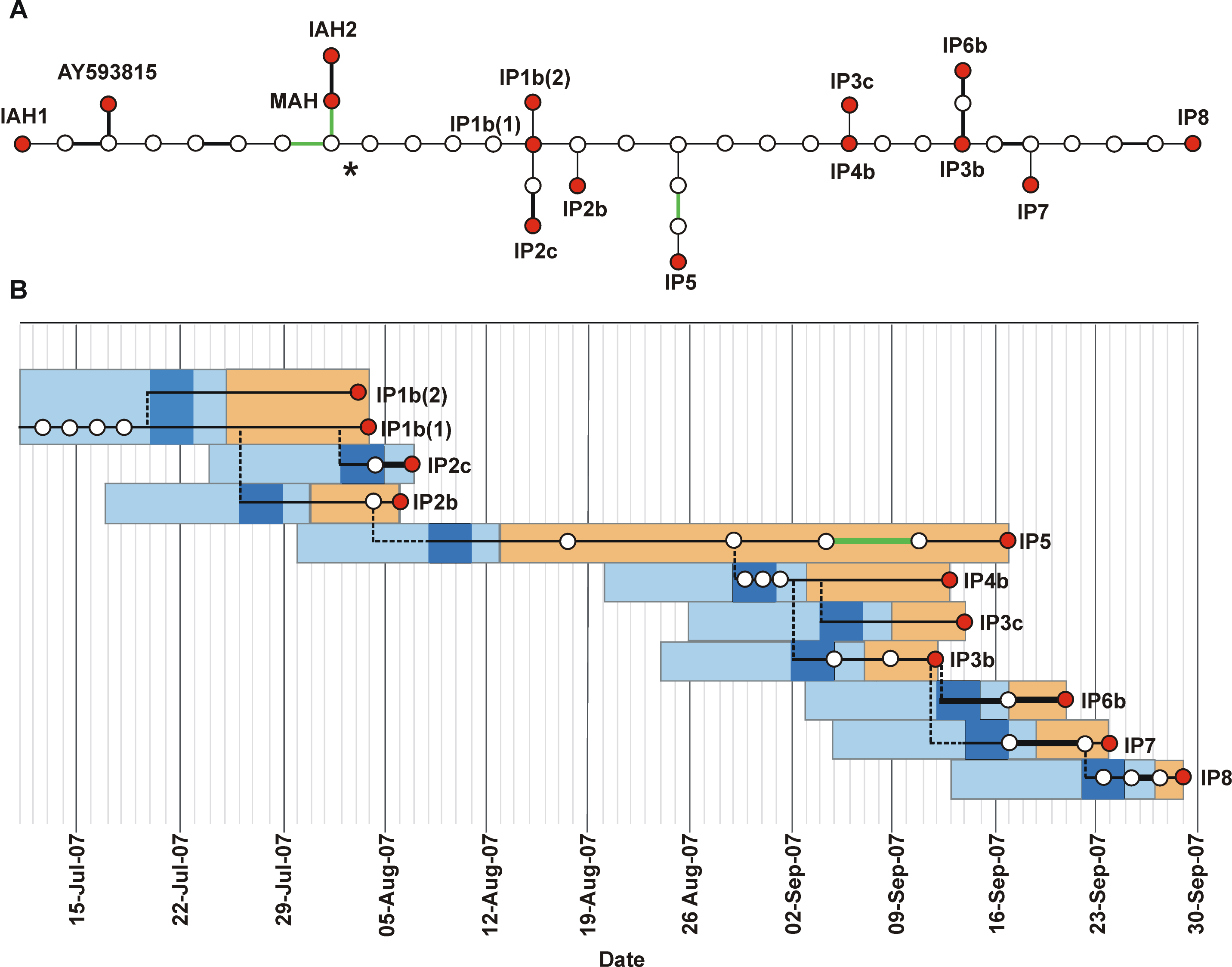
Analysis of foot-and-mouth disease virus (FMDV) sequence data from 2007 United Kingdom FMD outbreak.

A report into the epidemic was released on 5 September 2007. It reported that traces of the virus were found in a pipe at the Pirbright institute running from Merial to the government's treatment plant. It is thought that tree roots damaged the pipe allowing the virus to the surface. The report hypothesises that site workmen conveyed the virus to the Normandy farm en route home from work.

An independent investigation carried out by Brian Spratt found that due to the recognition that infected material could survive the initial citric acid disinfection stage within the Merial plant, the effluent system up to the final caustic soda treatment plant was considered by Defra inspectors to be within the scope of Containment Level 4, yet it appeared not to have been subject to regular inspection and there was evidence of leakage both from broken pipework and via unsealed, overflowing manholes:

23. The possibility of infectious virus being discharged to the effluent pipes was recognised by the Defra inspectors and, for this reason, the drainage system that leads to the caustic soda final treatment plant is considered part of Category 4 containment at Pirbright. It must therefore be well maintained and contained, so that infectious virus in effluent cannot escape.

32. The effluent pipes from IAH and Merial to the caustic soda final treatment plant are old and appear not to have been subject to regular thorough inspections to ensure their integrity. An inspection of the effluent pipes and manholes carried out for the HSE team showed deficiencies and it is considered very likely that they leak effluent. The effluent pipes are therefore not contained, as they should be as part of Category 4 containment at Pirbright.

— Professor Brian Spratt, Independent Review of the safety of UK facilities handling foot and mouth disease virus

In May 2008 the Surrey County Council, who has the authority to prosecute when there is negligence, found prosecution nonviable and wrote:

The county council's external legal advice is that a prosecution against either of the two laboratories at the centre of the outbreak is not possible. This was because:

Three Government-commissioned reports were unable to pinpoint the exact source of the outbreak

The council may not have been able to prove beyond doubt whether the Department for Environment, Food and Rural Affairs (Defra) licence conditions had been breached. This was particularly because the two laboratories shared the drainage systems under those conditions.

— Surrey County Council, No prosecutions over Pirbright foot and mouth leak 29 May 2008

== Media reporting incursion ==
The media were the only people to breach the police cordons. At the time Surrey Police Assistant Chief Constable Mark Rowley said "So far, two photographers have been arrested for breaching cordons, despite the obvious need to protect the area and clear signs prohibiting entry. No members of the public have tried to get inside contaminated areas and unfortunately the only attempted breaches have been by some of the media."

Peter Denard from Surrey Trading Standards stated: "This is a virulent disease spread on contact and proximity. The idea that anyone not wearing protective clothing and taking no bio-security measures is trampling through a potentially contaminated area of the countryside is beyond belief."

The two photographers, Philip Hollis of The Daily Telegraph and James Purkiss, were later found guilty under the Animal Health Act for ignoring prohibitions and entering protected sites. Hollis was fined £2,000 and ordered to pay £5,000 costs. Purkiss was sentenced to 140 hours of community service, and fined £1,150.

== See also ==
- 1967 United Kingdom foot-and-mouth outbreak
- 2001 United Kingdom foot-and-mouth crisis
- 2010 Japan foot-and-mouth outbreak
