= Pirbright Institute =

British research institute

Coordinates: 51.2797°N 0.6349°W

The Pirbright Institute
- Formation: 1987; 39 years ago
- Legal status: Government-funded research institute (registered charity)
- Purpose: Farm animal health and diseases in the UK
- Location: Ash Road, Pirbright, Surrey, England
- Region served: United Kingdom
- Members: Around 350 staff – half researchers, half operations
- Director: Bryan Charleston
- Parent organization: BBSRC
- Affiliations: DEFRA
- Budget: c. £30 million
- Website: www.pirbright.ac.uk
- Formerly called: Institute for Animal Health

The Pirbright Institute (formerly the Institute for Animal Health) is a research institute in Surrey, England, dedicated to the study of infectious diseases of farm animals. It forms part of the UK government's Biotechnology and Biological Sciences Research Council (BBSRC). The institute employs scientists, veterinarians, PhD students, and operations staff.

== History ==
It began in 1914 to test cows for tuberculosis. More buildings were added in 1925. Compton was established by the Agricultural Research Council in 1937. Pirbright became a research institute in 1939 and Compton in 1942. The Houghton Poultry Research Station at Houghton, Cambridgeshire was established in 1948. In 1963 Pirbright became the Animal Virus Research Institute and Compton became the Institute for Research on Animal Diseases. The Neuropathogenesis Unit (NPU) was established in Edinburgh in 1981. This became part of the Roslin Institute in 2007.

In 1987, Compton, Houghton and Pirbright became the Institute for Animal Health, being funded by BBSRC. Houghton closed in 1992, operations at Compton ended in 2015. The Edward Jenner Institute for Vaccine Research was sited at Compton until October 2005, when it merged with the vaccine programmes of the University of Oxford and the Institute for Animal Health.

The Pirbright site was implicated in the 2007 United Kingdom foot-and-mouth outbreak, with the Health and Safety Executive (HSE) concluding that a local case of the disease was a result of contaminated effluent release either from the Pirbright Institute or the neighbouring Merial Animal Health laboratory.

Significant investment (over £170 million) took place at Pirbright with the development of new world-class laboratory and animal facilities. The institute has been known as "The Pirbright Institute" since October 2012.

On 14 June 2019 the largest stock of the rinderpest virus was destroyed at the Pirbright Institute.

== Directors of note ==
- John Burns Brooksby 1964 until 1980

== Structure ==
The work previously carried out at Compton has either moved out to the university sector, ended or has been transferred to the Pirbright site. The Compton site currently carries out work on endemic (commonplace) animal diseases including some avian viruses and a small amount of bovine immunology whilst Pirbright works on exotic (unusual) animal diseases (usually caused by virus outbreaks). Pirbright has national and international reference laboratories of diseases. It is a biosafety level 4 laboratories (commonly referred to as "P4" or BSL-4).

=== Funding ===
25% of its income comes from a core grant from the BBSRC of around £11 million. Around 50% comes from research grants from related government organisations, such as DEFRA, or industry and charities (such as the Wellcome Trust). The remaining 25% comes from direct payments for work carried out.

The Bill & Melinda Gates Foundation has provided funding to the institute for research into veterinary infectious diseases and universal flu vaccine development.

== Function ==
The Pirbright Institute carries out research, diagnostics and surveillance of viruses carried predominantly by farm animals, such as foot-and-mouth disease virus (FMDV), African swine fever, bluetongue, lumpy skin disease and avian and swine flu. Understanding of viruses comes from molecular biology.

It carries out surveillance activities on farm animal health and disease movement in the UK.

== Services ==
- Arthropod supplies
- Diagnostics & Surveillance
- Disinfectant testing
- Flow cytometry & cell sorting
- Products – Includes positive sera, inactivated antigens, diagnostic kits, viral cultures and live midges.
- Training courses

== Location ==
The institute had two sites:

- Compton in Berkshire – closed in August 2015 with services relocated to new facilities at Pirbright.
- Pirbright in Surrey – shared with commercial company Merial

== See also ==
- 2007 United Kingdom foot-and-mouth outbreak
- World Organisation for Animal Health
- Bluetongue disease
- Veterinary Laboratories Agency (now part of the Animal and Plant Health Agency)
- Animal Health (now part of the Animal and Plant Health Agency)
- Animal and Plant Health Agency (an Executive Agency of the Department of Environment, Food and Rural Affairs)
