= Knowl Hill School =

Location
- School Lane; Pirbright; Woking, Surrey, GU24 0JN; England; 51.29758°N 0.6467°W

Information
- Type: Independent School Approved for pupils with Dyslexia, Dyspraxia and other Specific Learning Difficulties.
- Religious affiliation: non
- Established: 1984
- Founder: The Knowl Hill Foundation
- Local authority: Surrey
- Department for Education URN: 125436 Tables
- Ofsted: Reports
- Head teacher: Kas Govender
- Gender: Coeducational
- Age: 7 to 16
- Enrolment: 64
- Colours: Blue and gold
- Website: www.knowlhillschool.org.uk

Knowl Hill School is an independent school in the village of Pirbright in Surrey. Knowl Hill is a co-educational (mixed gender) school. There is a Junior school with pupils from years 3 to year 7, and a Senior school with years 8 to 11. It is a relatively small school with up to 67 pupils. Speech and Language Therapy and Occupational Therapy is provided on site, and integrated into the lessons as well as being offered on a 1:1 basis.

== History ==
Knowl Hill was founded in 1984. As well as standard classrooms, the school also provides a science lab and an art block with a photography studio. The school itself is small, as are the grounds within which the school is located. Because of this, certain activities or sports take place outside the school, for example tennis which takes place on public tennis courts within the village of Pirbright itself around a one-minute walk from the school.
