= Pirbright =

Village and civil parish in Surrey, England

Coordinates: 51°17′10″N 0°38′20″W

- Village and civil parish
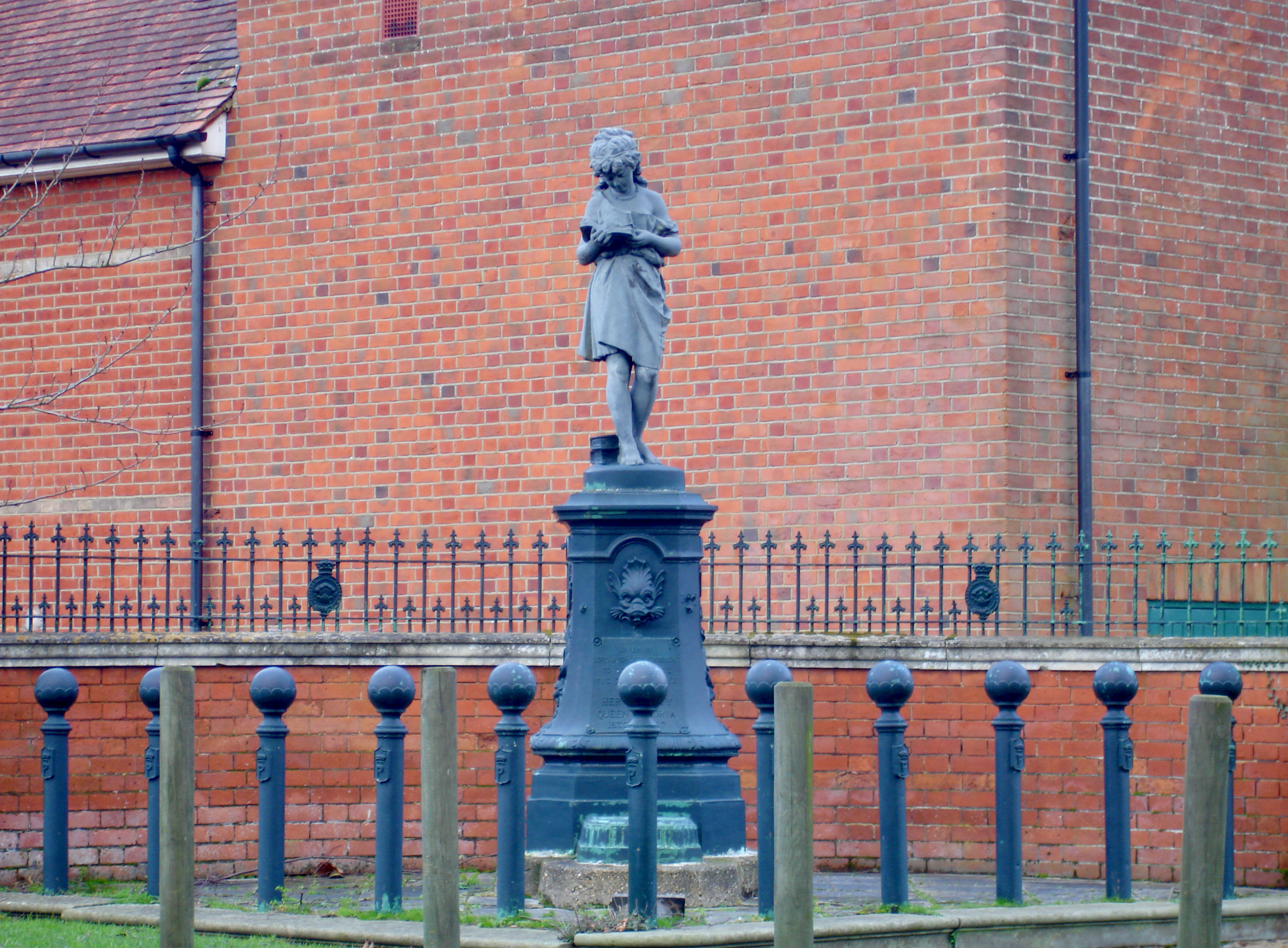
- Statue near Pirbright village hall

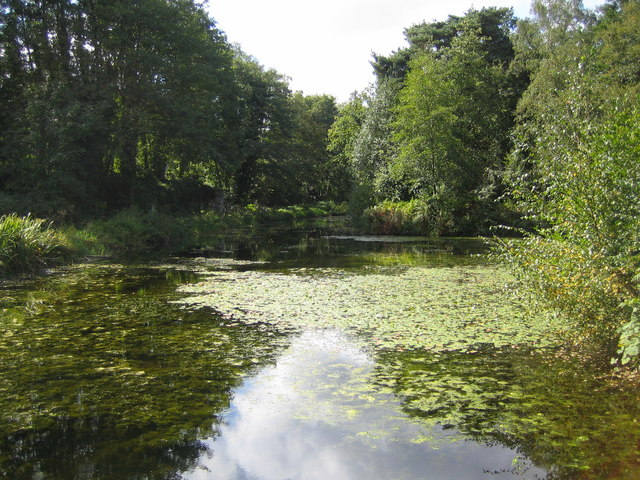
- The Basingstoke Canal divides the communities of Pirbright

- Location within Surrey
- Area: 19.01 km^{2} (7.34 sq mi)
- Population: 3,691 (Civil Parish 2011)
  - Density: 194/km^{2} (500/sq mi)
- OS grid reference: SU950550
- Civil parish: Pirbright
- District: Guildford
- Shire county: Surrey
- Region: South East
- Country: England
- Sovereign state: United Kingdom
- Post town: Woking
- Postcode district: GU24
- Dialling code: 01483
- Police: Surrey
- Fire: Surrey
- Ambulance: South East Coast
- UK Parliament: Surrey Heath

Pirbright (/ˈpɜːrbraɪt/) is a village in Surrey, England. Pirbright is in the borough of Guildford and has a civil parish council covering the traditional boundaries of the area. Pirbright contains one buffered sub-locality, Stanford Common near the nation's farm animal disease research institute. The village's grade II* listed medieval church has a large Boulder grave for explorer Henry Morton Stanley. The nearby section of Hodge Brook is also known as the Congo Stream, between Ruwenzori Hills and Stanley Pool.

== Geography ==
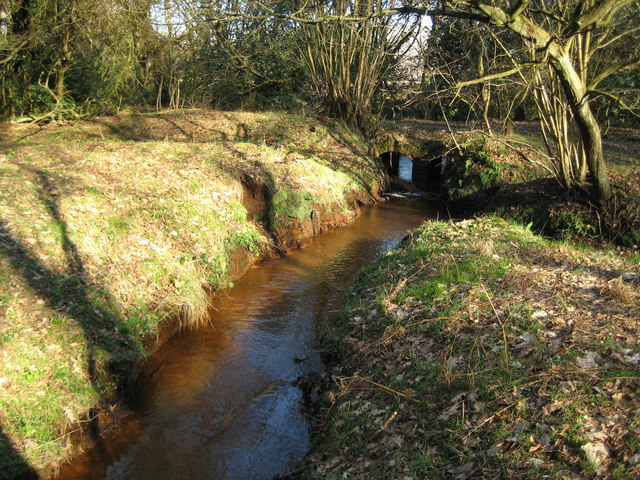
Most of the parish is lightly or densely wooded, such as at Stamford Common.

Pirbright has two communities: army training barracks and designated homes are north of a London main axis (south-west) railway and the slightly dispersed village is south. The village is almost entirely surrounded by heathland, much of it owned by the Ministry of Defence and used by the Army Training Centre Pirbright. The south and south-east of the parish is mostly woodland and has three small farms. The south-west of the parish has a large military training area, Pirbright Common. Near to the church are several features due to Stanley's association with the village: Hodge Brook is equally marked as Congo Stream, between Ruwenzori Hill and Stanley Hill. Mazamboni Farm is next to Aruwimi Wood.

== History ==
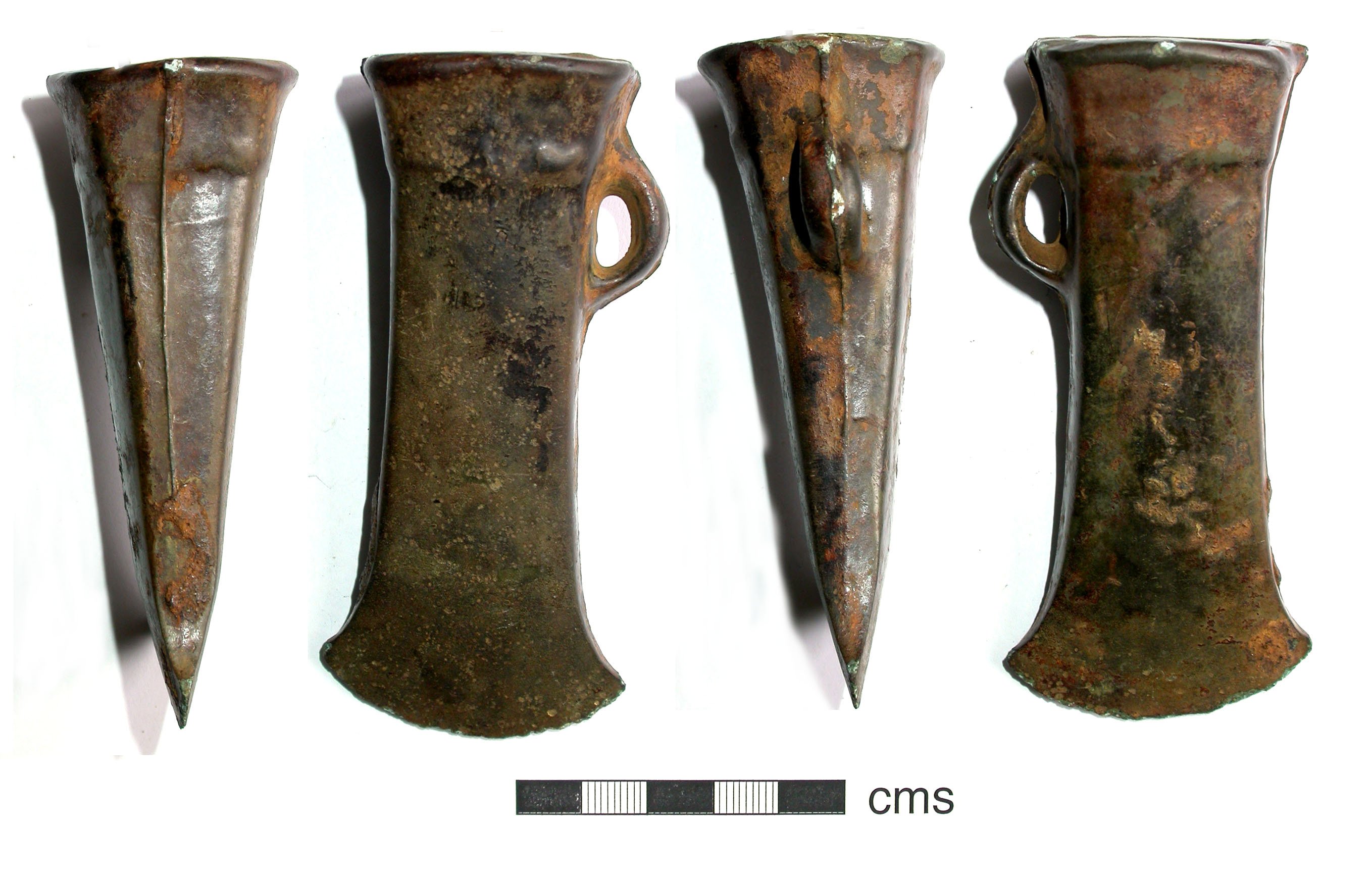
A socketed axehead from the late Bronze Age, found in Pirbright in 2005 and dated to c. 900 – c. 700 BCE

=== Name ===
Its name had three medieval variants (each involving the letter 'f' where there is currently a 'b'). It came from Anglo-Saxon (Old English) Pirige-fyrhþ = "sparse woodland where peartrees grow".

=== Medieval and Tudor periods ===
The manor of Pirbright does not seem to occur earlier than the 13th century, when it was reported to be held of the honour of Clare by Peter de Pirbright. John Trenchard died seised of it (holding) under the Earl of Gloucester in 1301–2. In this time it had a medieval deer park, disparked under Richard II. During the reign of Henry VIII the manor changed hands several times: it formed part of the marriage portion of Queen Katharine of Aragon and was successively in the possession of Sir Thomas Boleyn and Sir William Fitz William. Finally it was granted to Sir Anthony Browne, afterwards Viscount Montagu, with whose family it remained until the middle of the next century.

=== 18th century and afterwards ===
The locality saw development in the form of brick labourers' cottages with a few Georgian large homes, some with modest estates of land. Of the last sort, Vice-Admiral the Hon. John "Foulweather Jack" Byron, explorer, grandfather of the poet Lord Byron planted in the late 18th century an avenue of Scotch pines to the foot of a tower hill, Crown Prince Hill, in the woods, still called Admiral's Walk or 'road', which extends for 1 mile (1.6 km), half within the Danger Area owned by the Ministry of Defence of Pirbright Common.

Heatherside was the early 20th-century home of F. C. Selous, the African big-game hunter, and contained a "remarkable collection of hunting spoils and native African curiosities."

Pirbright's traditional churchyard contains the large block of granite, 11 feet high, marking the grave of British Empire soldier and explorer Henry Morton Stanley, who died in London aged 63. This is partly inscribed with the words "Henry Morton Stanley Bula Matari 1841–1904 Africa". Bula Matari was another of his names and translates as "Breaker of Rocks" or "Breakstones" in Kongo.

A large fire occurred in the area in April 2022.

== Pirbright Institute ==
The Pirbright Institute is a research establishment, based at Pirbright, that investigates diseases in farm animals. (A second site at Compton, Berkshire was closed in 2016 with research being transferred to the Pirbright site.) It is one of eight UK research institutes supported by the United Kingdom's Biotechnology and Biological Sciences Research Council (BBSRC). The Pirbright site includes international reference laboratories for the diagnosis of livestock diseases exotic to the UK, including the World Reference Laboratory for foot and mouth disease. The site also conducts research on viruses, including foot and mouth disease and bluetongue virus.

On Saturday, 4 August 2007, it was announced that the strain of foot-and-mouth disease detected in cattle 3 miles (4.8 kilometres) away was similar to that in use at the Pirbright site. Professor Brian Spratt's report found that more likely than not the strain of the virus came from the Merial vaccine production facility or the Pirbright Institute laboratory: whose shared "effluent pipes [leading to final small treatment plant were] not contained, as they should be as part of Category 4 containment at Pirbright." This poor condition of pipes and incursion of trees in the site has since been rectified and significant investment (over £170 million) is taking place at Pirbright to provide new laboratory and animal facilities.

== Education ==
There are three schools in Pirbright, including two on School Lane, and a small all-through school, Knowl Hill School, for children with dyslexia which provides education for around fifty pupils. The largest school is the centrally located Pirbright Village Primary School, which educates children from the age of 4 to 11.

=== Youth outreach ===
The Normandy Youth Centre serves the wider area by sponsoring community-based programmes targeting youth in the area for the purpose of increasing exposure to educational opportunities and building a stronger community.

== Landmarks ==
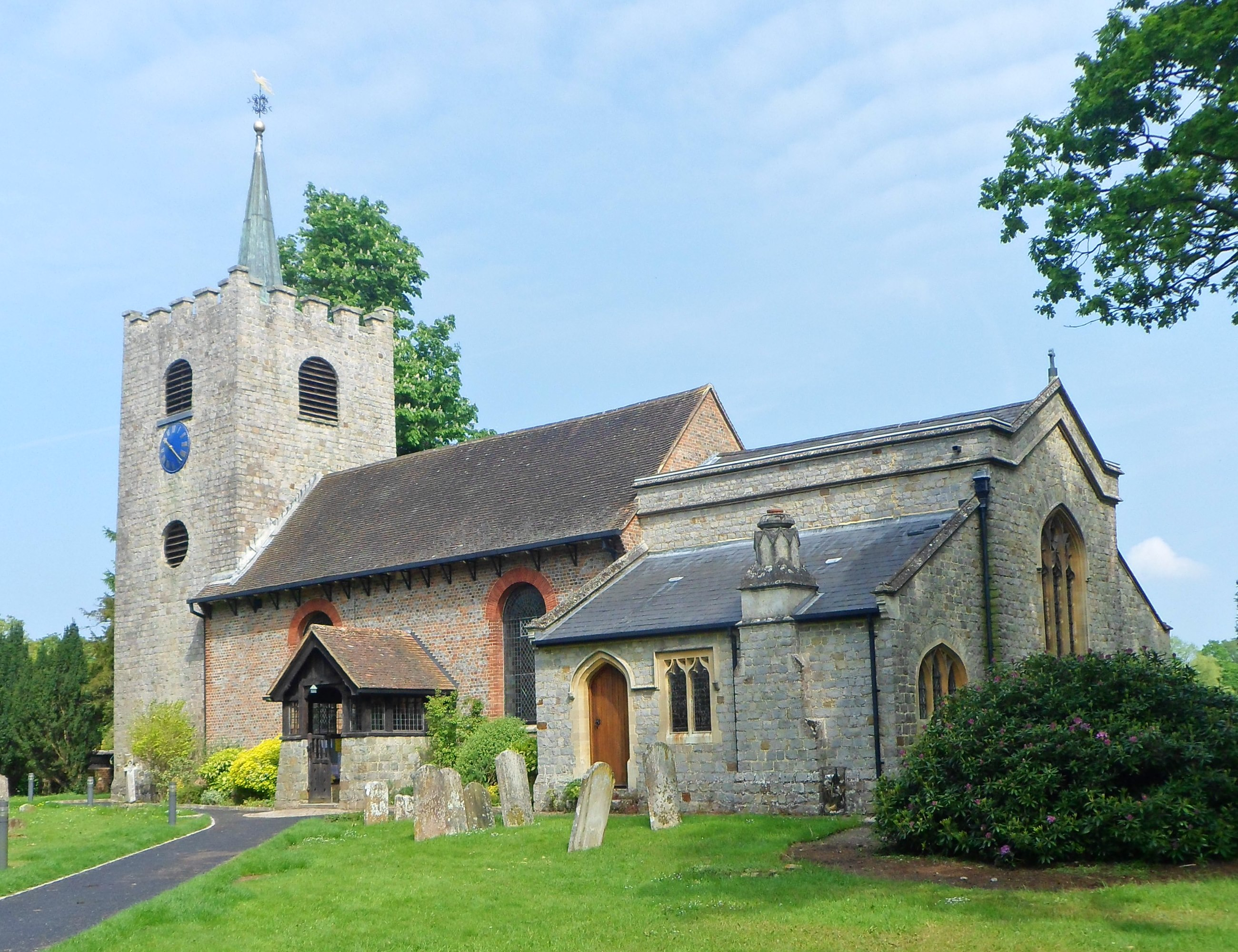
St Michael and All Angels' Church

=== Church of St Michael and All Angels ===
The small church stands by Church Cottage in the meadows directly west of the village centre. It is built of brick dressings to a galleted 'heathstone' walls to its nave, with a galleted heathstone tower to west and chancel to east. Plain tiled roof with lead spike over tower. Box nave with square tower to west, gabled porch to south, aisle to north, chancel to east with vestry to north and organ bay to south.

=== Moated 'manor house' which held the manorial courts ===
The manorial courthouse was renamed in the 19th century and has a moat, and a great proportion of the building was built in the 16th century, is timber-framed however the building is partially clad in red and blue brick and in brown and red brick on its non-timber framed cross wing.

== Sport ==
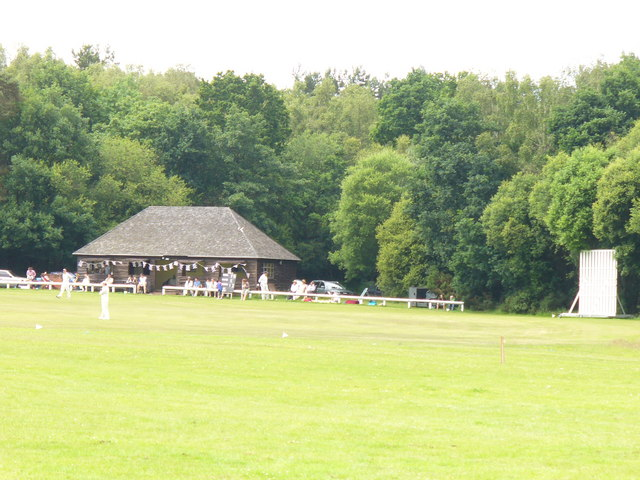
Cricket ground with woodland background

Cricket has been played on the village green since 1780. The principal cricket club is Pirbright Cricket Club, which has a 1st XI, a Sunday team, a women's team, a midweek team, and youth teams.

Pirbright is the home of Pirbright Tennis Club, which was formed in 1976. Initially playing in the Burrow Hill part of the village, the club soon moved to its ground on School Lane. Pirbright Tennis Club has over 300 members and five adult teams; the courts are also used by students from the local schools.

== Famous residents ==
- Ross Lowis Mangles, first civilian recipient of the Victoria Cross who has a brass memorial on the north wall of St Michael and All Angels Church, Pirbright.
- James Pearce, presenter for BBC Sport
- Henry de Worms, Lord Pirbright PC, DL, JP, FRS chose to relate his peerage to his later life home when elevated to the peerage in 1895 however he died without male heirs in 1903.
- Sir G. A. H. Branson (1871–1951), a High Court judge and the grandfather of Richard Branson, lived at Bullswater House, Pirbright.
- Sir Edmund Thiele, a famous geologist, lived out his later years with his wife until he died in 1971.
- Alan Owston (1853–1915), born on 7 August 1853 at Pirbright, Surrey, and buried on 30 November 1915 at Yokohama, Japan. He was a collector of Asian wildlife, businessman, yachtsman, and founder of the Yokohama Yacht Club.

== Demography and housing ==
2011 Census Homes
Output area	Detached	Semi-detached	Terraced	Flats and apartments	Caravans/temporary/mobile homes	Shared between households
(Civil Parish)	360	449	253	37	2	0

The average level of accommodation in the region composed of detached houses was 28%; the average that was apartments was 22.6%.

2011 Census Key Statistics
Output area	Population	Households	% Owned outright	% Owned with a loan	Hectares
(Civil Parish)	3,691	1,101	23.9%	24.5%	1,901

The proportion of households in the civil parish who owned their home outright compares to the regional average of 35.1%. The proportion who owned their home with a loan compares to the regional average of 32.5%. The remaining % is made up of rented dwellings (plus a negligible % of households living rent-free).

== Twinning ==
Pirbright is twinned with :

- Cagny, Calvados, France
