= James Pearce (journalist) =

British journalist and presenter

James Pearce is a British journalist and presenter for BBC Sport, who has reported from eight Olympic Games. Pearce was the Olympic Correspondent for the BBC at the 2012 London Olympic Games. Notable scoops by Pearce include the revelation that England were attempting to 'butter' up FIFA voters with gifts of luxury handbags in order to gain votes during their ill-fated bid for the 2018 World Cup. Pearce holds the dubious honour of scoring the first "goal" at the new Wembley Stadium during a broadcast on the BBC News channel.

== Early life ==
Pearce was brought up in the village of Pirbright in Surrey.

== Education ==
Pearce was educated at Radley College, which he entered in 1983, a boarding independent school near the village of Radley in Oxfordshire. After a gap year in New Zealand at Lindisfarne College, he studied Politics at University of Exeter in Devon.
