= Effluent decontamination system =

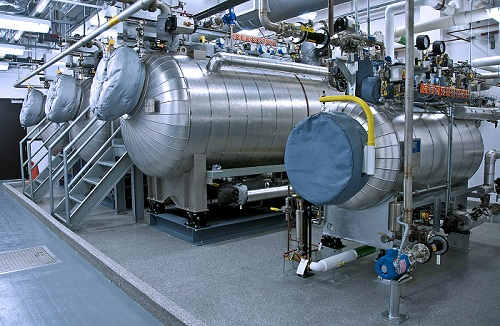
A batch Effluent Decontamination System

An effluent decontamination system (EDS) is a device, or suite of devices, designed to decontaminate or sterilise biologically active or biohazardous materials in fluid and liquid waste material. Facility types that may utilise an EDS include hospitals, food and beverage industry plants, research laboratories, agricultural and animal research facilities, pharmaceutical production facilities, and governmental or military facilities. In fact, all facilities in the United States of America that produce liquid waste of Biosafety Level 2 and above must decontaminate their waste before discharging it into a public sewer system. Examples of liquids sterilised in an EDS include the shower water from personnel decontamination rooms, and the waste water from washing down animal rooms in laboratory environments.

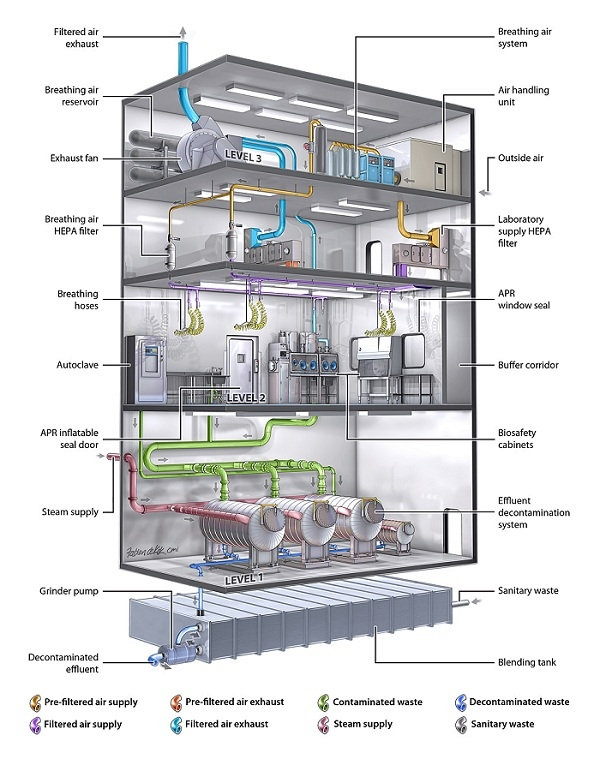
Effluent Decontamination Systems are an essential feature of Biosafety Level 4 laboratories.

While EDS are designed chiefly to sterilise liquid waste, they can in some instances sterilise solid material carried by the liquid effluent. However the EDS may require grinders to break down the solid materials before they enter site of sterilisation in the EDS, and macerating paddles to stir effluent held in tanks, reducing congelation.

EDS vary in their design and function, however the use of either chemical or heat sterilisation is common.

== Batch steam effluent decontamination system ==
A Batch EDS consists of at least one sterilisation tank (also known as a kill tank, or a cook tank). The sterilisation tank is commonly a jacketed vessel, which is a container with hollow walls. Effluent flows into the kill tank either by gravity or through being pumped into the tank. Once the tank is full of effluent, high-temperature pressurised steam is passed through the cavity in the walls of jacketed vessel, raising its temperature of over 121 °C. Once all the effluent has been heated to at least 121 °C for at least 30 minutes, all biologically hazardous material within the kill tank will have been sterilised. At this point, the tank may be emptied by gravity or by fluid displacement.

While a batch EDS must have at least one sterilisation tank, multiple sterilisation tanks can be used and fed from dedicated storage tanks. It is noteworthy that when a kill tank is not running, it can function like a storage tank – collecting effluent and wastewater until it is full enough to sterilise.

== Batch steam injection effluent decontamination system ==
Batch steam injection systems function similarly to a batch steam EDS, but steam is passed directly through the effluent during the sterilisation stage. This procedure increases the speed at which the effluent can reach the required sterilisation temperature, increasing the throughput time. Speed of processing is offset against the volume of effluent that can be sterilised, as the steam takes up space that could be used to hold effluent. Steam injection is a very noisy process – steam rushing through the effluent can sound like a jet engine. The process can also cause solid material to stick to the sides of the sterilisation tank, which can hinder heat transference from the walls of a jacketed vessel. Low temperature and pressure variants of batch steam injection EDS have been shown capable of decontaminating biosafety level 2 waste by subjecting it to a sterilisation temperature of 82.2 °C. This low temperature requires a long time period of six hours to achieve sterilisation.

== Continuous flow effluent decontamination systems ==
Continuous flow EDS pass liquid effluent through a distance of heated pipework to sterilise it. The heated pipework is frequently coiled to minimise heat loss and the space required. The length and bore of the heated pipework can vary greatly, depending on the rate of flow of the effluent and the temperature that the pipework is heated to. As a hotter temperature sterilises faster, the hotter the temperature of the pipework, the higher the flow rate of the continuous flow EDS. Natural gas, steam or electricity can provide the heat required for sterilisation.

== Batch chemical effluent decontamination systems ==
For smaller scale systems of less than 100 gallons a day, chemical effluent decontamination systems can be used. Effluent is collected in a sterilisation tank, where it is mixed with a chemical sterilant such as bleach. The effluent and sterilant mixture are then held for sufficient time to ensure all micro-organisms in the effluent have been sterilised. After sterilisation, the sterilant must be neutralised before the effluent can discarded into a sewer. As such, a batch chemical EDS requires a large quantity of chemicals, both sterilants and neutralisers, to operate

Studies show that Bacillus spores within effluent containing a mixture of animal effluent, humic acid, and fetal bovine serum can be deactivated in a bleach-based chemical EDS effectively at a sterilant concentration of less than 5700 parts per million over two hours of exposure
