= Japan foot-and-mouth outbreak =

Animal disease outbreak in Japan

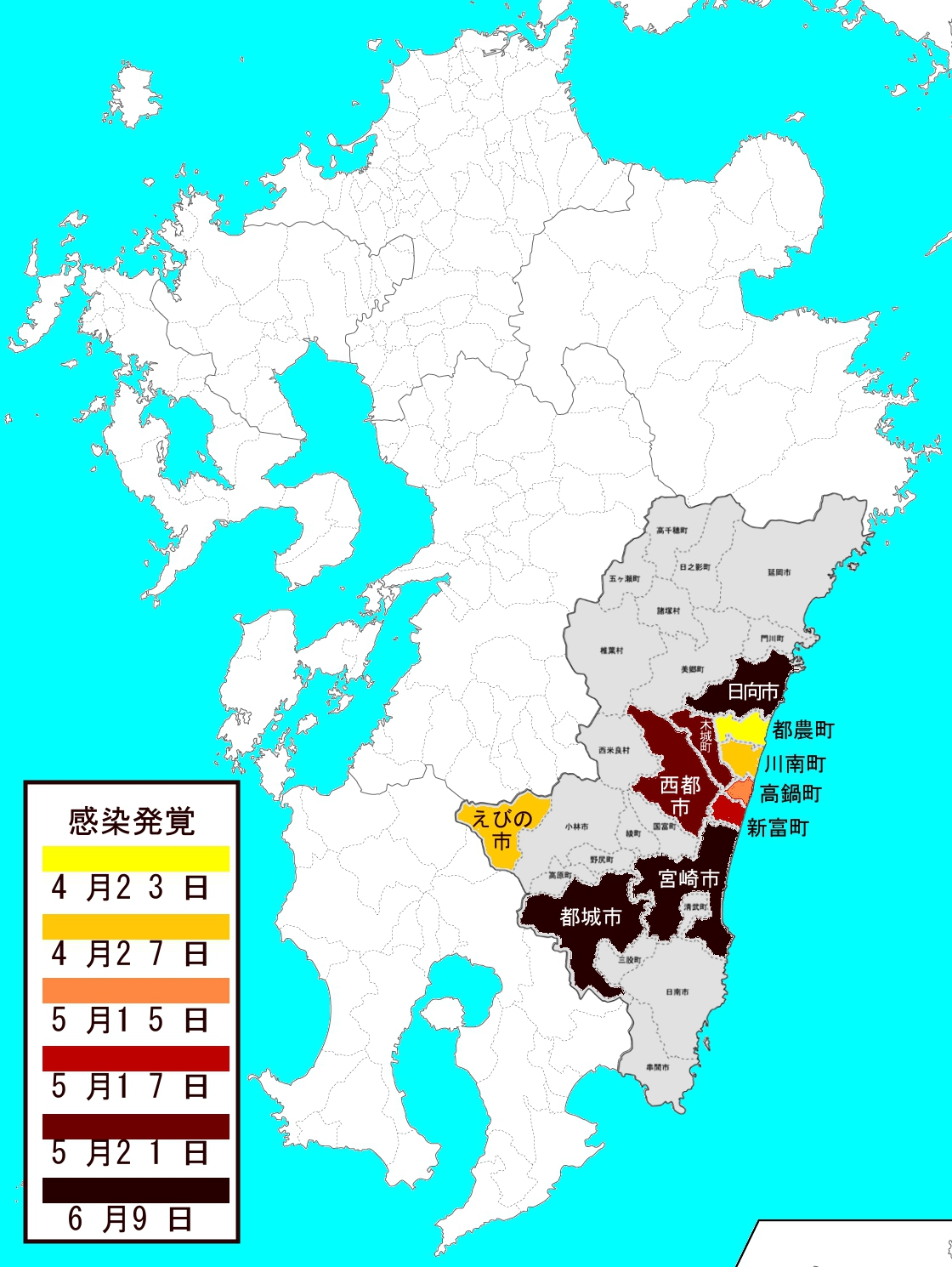
Municipalities where FMD was identified. Light yellow: April 23, dark yellow: April 27, orange: May 15, light brown: May 17, dark brown: May 21, black: June 9.

The Japan foot-and-mouth outbreak in 2010 occurred in Miyazaki Prefecture, affecting cattle, swine, sheep and goats. A similar outbreak had occurred ten years earlier, in 2000. Located on the eastern coast of Japan's Kyūshū island, Miyazaki Prefecture plays a significant role in supplying top-quality Wagyū cattle for the production of Wagyū beef throughout Japan including Matsuzaka and Ōmi. The number of livestock killed was 297,808, and the estimated economic loss was 235 billion yen.

== History of the outbreak ==
=== 2000 outbreak ===
The first FMD case in Miyazaki in 93 years was identified on March 25, 2000. The following day, the infected cattle were slaughtered. The Miyazaki FMD Control Department announced on March 29 that the virus had been identified as serotype O. A further announcement on April 2 revealed that nine more cattle were infected, and that the first case could have been contracted from straw imported from China, but this was never confirmed. The Ministry of Agriculture, Forestry and Fisheries (MAFF) confirmed on April 3 that the first case was serotype O ME-SA PanAsia. On April 9, samples from 16 animals, showing no clinical signs of infection, underwent ELISA antibody testing; five days later, the test results were revealed to be positive, and the cattle were slaughtered. The MAFF announced a budget of 10 billion yen for affected farmers on April 27, and on May 10 Miyazaki Prefecture declared the disease eradicated. Overall, approximately 700 cattle were slaughtered in this outbreak.

=== 2006 ===
In December 2006, Hisashi Makizaki, an ex-trainee at Livestock Raising Examination Facility in Miyazaki Prefecture, stole approximately 40 straw type vials which contained cryo-preserved sperm, one of Japan's top stud bulls and a legend in Miyazaki. It was later reported that he had three accomplices (two stockbreeders, one office worker) involved in selling specimens both within and outside of Miyazaki Prefecture including Hokkaido, northernmost of the four main islands of Japan. They were charged with not only stealing 40 vials of 0.5 cc frozen bull semen in December 2006, but also stealing about 100 vials again in January 2007.

Specimens were sold illegally for ¥100,000 to ¥150,000 per container without a Wagyu certificate, or ¥200,000 with a certificate. The legal price with a certificate is normally ¥5,000. The four were arrested and Makizaki was sentenced later to 3½ years in prison.

=== 2007 ===
On March 7, 2007, Asahi Shimbun reported that a total of 143 cryo-preserved sperm samples from stud bulls for selective breeding had been stolen from the Livestock Raising Examination Facility in Miyazaki Prefecture.

=== 2009 ===
In October 2009, 1300 cryo-preserved sperm containers from stud bulls were stolen from the Miyazaki Prefecture office of Japan Agriculture

=== 2010 ===
==== January ====
Seiichiro Dokyu (Democratic Party of Japan (DPJ) lawmaker, Miyazaki Prefecture) proposed that several farms in Kumamoto Prefecture should accept Korean trainees through the Japan International Cooperation Agency (JICA).

==== February ====
Agura Farm accepted a Korean trainee who was from Pocheon-si, Gyeonggi-do. The owner of this farm was reported to have committed suicide later.

==== March ====
A farmer in Tsuno town, Miyazaki, notified a veterinarian that one of his water buffalos had diarrhea. The water buffalos produced the milk used to make mozzarella cheese, which is a key commercial activity of the farm. According to contemporaneous reports from [Nishinippon Shimbun], and other media outlets (31 March 2010), the attending veterinarian escalated the case to the [Miyazaki Livestock Hygiene Service Center] for differential diagnosis. Initial clinical examinations revealed no overt signs consistent with foot-and-mouth disease (FMD), nor were bacterial or viral pathogens conclusively identified as etiological agents. The gastrointestinal symptoms subsequently resolved spontaneously without determination of causation. The sample taken from the water buffalo on 31 March was later found to be FMD positive on 23 April after a DNA test conducted on 22 April (case 6). By this juncture, Miyazaki Prefecture and national agricultural authorities had documented four confirmed FMD cases within the region. Archival data indicates three animal specimens had been collected for analysis prior to Case 6 confirmation. Notably, due to the symptoms were different from the one in 2000, This variance in disease manifestation contributed to delayed pathogen identification.

==== April ====
Agura Farm was reported to have had more than 100 cattle with FMD at the beginning of the month, but this was not disclosed until later.

On April 9, a cow in Tsuno town was diagnosed with oral inflammation. Junichi Aoki, a private veterinarian, requested the Miyazaki Livestock Hygiene Service Center to assess the symptoms. Upon examination by a veterinarian and officials from the Infectious Disease Prevention Department, only one cow exhibited symptoms. For a fast-spreading infectious disease such as FMD, this was insufficient evidence to confirm the disease. Consequently, the case was classified as inconclusive, and no public report was issued. Details on what diagnosis was made are unknown. In this case, the cattle had slight dribbling saliva, an ulcerous scab, and fever. Poor appetite and fever were present only for a day. In addition, four days had already passed since the recovery from one-day fever. FMD cattle usually have blisters or heavy saliva dribbling. The incubation period for FMD is about 1 week in cattle. The veterinarian checked the farm daily until April 12, but no cattle with symptoms were reported.

On April 16, a second case was reported on the same farm. On April 17, after inspecting the farm, two additional cases with similar symptoms were identified. Authentication was started. According to the Prevention of Epidemics Guideline, Miyazaki Livestock Hygiene Service Center must be notified immediately when more than 2 cases are present. For that reason, Metro medias criticized the farm's delay for neglect. Some reports suggested that four cattle were showing symptoms by May 31, but this has never been confirmed. On April 19, after the elimination of a possible diagnosis for Ibaraki disease and other diseases, the samples were sent to the National Institute of Animal Health (NIAH), Epidemiological Research Team in Kodaira City, Tokyo for confirmation of FMD. It is possible the MAFF was notified at this point.

On April 20 (Day 0), the first confirmed case of foot-and-mouth disease (FMD) in Miyazaki Prefecture was reported, marking the first outbreak in Japan since 2000. The export of all Japanese Beef was banned. Miyazaki Prefectural government confirmed three suspicious cases in Tsuno Town and the AFF set up an FMD control and prevention department in Kasumigaseki, Tokyo. The Minister of AFF Hirotaka Akamatsu was nominated chief officer. He received a report about a huge shortage of Virkon-S, disinfecting solution, from Itsuki Toyama, (DPJ, Miyazaki Pref.) Miyazaki Pref. started to disinfect the area by setting up with transportation restrictions and locations for sterilization. No orders or directions by the Minister of AFF Akamatsu were given. On April 21, local authorities experienced confusion due to a lack of guidance from the national government. There was not enough of the disinfectant prepared by a local agricultural union to be distributed to all the farmers. Miyazaki Livestock Improvement Association stopped producing the sperm straws which make up the major part of Japan's production (15,000 a year). The amount of stock in distribution would last for two months; remaining stocks for about one year. On April 22, the Vice-Minister of AFF, Yamada (DPJ), said at Congress, "I have heard about the Miyazaki situation just now." The House of Representatives Committee on Agriculture, Forestry and Fisheries was held and the Minister Akamatsu granted emergency budget. No details were given. Promises to prevent economic damage from the disease were given. Ideguchi, a chief contact officer of Miyazaki Veterinary Medical Association observed the development of the clinical condition of the first case of FMD and analyzed how delay had been caused because the development was so different from textbook conditions.

Miyazaki JA's Economic Agriculture Union Association received sodium carbonate for stock buildings or surroundings. Also disinfectant to sanitize vehicles and shoes became available. Distribution to all JA in Miyazaki started. On April 23, the first case of FMD at Tsuno-town was diagnosed as FMD (type O). The Minister of AFF, Akamatsu, announced that the Government would compensate for the costs of spraying disinfectants. On April 25, it was confirmed that 4 more cattle were infected. 1,108 cattle would be slaughtered. The number became the worst in Japanese FMD history in the past 100 years (cf. in the UK, at least 10 million animals were slaughtered in 2001). Miyazaki Pref. temporarily shut down a portion (1.5 km) of Route 307 where many farms were suspected of being contaminated. On April 27, 5 pigs at Kawaminami town in Koyu county next to Tsuno town were reported to be highly contaminated. The Governor Hideo Higashikokubaru, Kohichi Nakamura (a Chairperson of prefecture committee), and Masaharu Haneda (Chairperson of JA Miyazaki Central Committee) requested that the Minister of AFF Akamatsu to take a further step for an emergency budget. In order to prevent further spread, an investigation into the cause of FMD was requested as well. Ebino-city was confirmed with infection. Since the city is located next to the border of Kagoshima and Kumamoto, this brought more alarm to the area. The final case in Ebino city was found May 13. No further cases were found. Governor Higashikokubaru requested the support of the Minister of AFF Akamatsu and the Secretary-General of Liberal Democratic Party (LDP), Sadakazu Tanigaki. The Minister Akamatsu did not respond to this. On April 28, the Secretary-General of LDP Tanigaki visited Kawaminami town in Miyazaki Pref. Tanigaki works as a chief of the FMD Control and Prevention Department of the LDP.

The Food and Agriculture Organization (FAO) warned that having 3 FMD cases in 4 months was very serious in the light of recent outbreaks in Japan and Korea. In the report, the FAO referred to the possibility of FMD spreading onwards from Japan and Korea - as had happened in South Africa, England, and Europe in 2001. The economic damage would be in millions of dollars and international surveillance was to be heightened. (reference: May 21, May 25) The government held its second meeting of the ruling DPJ-led FMD Control and Prevention Department headed by the Minister of AFF Akamatsu. It was made clear that the cost of disinfection spray at all the borders to other prefectures would be compensated by funds from the national reserve. An increase in the number of workers such as veterinarians who assist with slaughter for further prevention was also announced. (Note: There existed two different FMD departments at this point. The opposition LDP had set up one owing to the central government's [DPJ government] slow progress in controlling the outbreak.)

A cow confirmed infected in Ebino-city in Miyazaki was the 9th case and was located 70 km away from the first case. Based on the guidelines for prevention of livestock epidemics, the farmers were forced to obey restrictions for travel and transport. The contaminated farm was said to be associated with epidemiological research and this raised suspicions that the farm could have been contaminated by the virus as a result. The 10th infected case in Miyazaki Pref. was confirmed. The 1st FMD infected pig was found and confirmed. On April 29, the Vice-Minister of AFF Yamada (DPJ) travelled to Miyazaki Prefecture; he did not visit any farms nor did he meet with any producers. On April 30, the FMD Control and Prevention Department submitted 42 requests to the government regarding the foot-and-mouth disease (FMD) outbreak. However, Yasue Funayama (the Parliamentary Secretary of the Ministry of Agriculture, Forestry and Fisheries) and the Vice-Chief Cabinet Secretary Takaharu Matsui cancelled the meeting on the same day. In the evening, the Minister of AFF Akamatsu left on a trip to South America, and did not return until May 8. Seiichi Hamada (LDP Chief Deputy Chairman of Diet Affairs Committee) suggested to Minister Akamatsu that he should take domestic issues such as FMD seriously and cancel foreign travel. (article found on May 19) During Akamatsu's absence, Mizuho Fukushima (Consumer Administration/Chairman of Research Commission on Declining Birthrate Issues) was appointed to work on the outbreak as the State Minister in Charge of the AFF Ministry. The LDP requested that a committee should convene on June 7 to discuss FMD, but the government refused.

Continuing infection was reported, 12 cases, 4,369 to be slaughtered. The government expanded the area for transportation restriction to 4 prefectures (Miyazaki, Kagoshima, Ohita, and Kumamoto). The DPJ revitalized the budget for the central livestock committee for the compensation of FMD affected farmers. Metro Media made it sound as if the government had sent provision for disinfectants to Miyazaki Prefecture, but none had been sent from the government at this time.

==== May ====
===== May 1 to 11 =====
Miyazaki Prefecture asked the Japan Self-Defense Forces (JSDF) to send a disaster relief delegation to the prefecture. Prime Minister Yukio Hatoyama participated in a memorial service for Minamata disease (a poisoning caused by industrial mercury pollution) in Kumamoto Pref which is located adjacent to Miyazaki Prefecture. During his visit, he made an inspection of a rush (tatami mat grass) farm, but never visited Miyazaki.

On May 2, there were 15 infected cattle and 8,974 affected cattle due to be slaughtered.

On May 3, the 17th infected animal was confirmed. 9,000 cattle were due to be slaughtered.

Bayer, Japan Ltd., provided 1,500 doses of Virkon disinfectant, but it was reported that 500 were seized by Ichiro Ozawa (DPJ's Chief Secretary) and the Foreign Affairs Minister Katsuya Okada. They gave the 500 doses of Virkon to the Chinese and Korean Governments. Mr. Ozawa appeared to have given another 500 doses of Virkon-S to the farmers in his home town, Iwate Pref, and only 500 were sent to Kyushu, where Miyazaki is located. During this turmoil, Korea imported 15,000 doses of Virkon from Germany via an Air Force plane. Iwate Nippou reported extra shipment of VirkonS to Ozawa's hometown.

On May 4, the 19th suspected case was confirmed as being infected with FMD. 27,000 cattle were due to be slaughtered.

Prime Minister Hatoyama visited Okinawa for Futenma on an issue concerning U.S. military bases. No visit to Miyazaki was made. Yasue Funayama, the Parliamentary Secretary of the Ministry of Agriculture, Forestry and Fisheries left to visit Denmark. Her return to Japan was on May 9.

MAFF confirmed that the cases of 1,2,3,4,5,7,8 of the FMD in Miyazaki were similar to those widely spread in Korea, and also within Asia (O/JPN/2010).

The 2nd case in Ebino city was found, 320 swine were killed at 3:45pm after the visual test result. It took 8 hours to finish burying the bodies.

On May 5, in Ebino city which is about 70 km away from where the first case was found. 23 cattle were found to be infected, 34,000 cattle were due to be slaughtered.

Miyazaki Governor Higashikokubaru declared a state of emergency. Miyazaki Prefecture established a special mission team holding the Vice Governor Kohno as chief. 17 infected cattle were found, 27,772 cattle were reported to be slaughtered.

On May 6, 35 infected cattle were confirmed adding 10,000 more cattle due to be killed. Kumamoto Pref. canceled the auction at its livestock market for May jeopardizing approximately worth ¥1,800,000,000（about $19 million).

The Ministry of Agriculture, Forestry and Fisheries announced on May 4 that the Miyazaki's FMD virus was similar to the Korean type O on 5th, however, after the genetic analysis provided by Pirbright Laboratory (the international Reference Laboratory in respect of 10 exotic viral diseases of livestock based in the UK) it was announced that the virus was also very similar to the China-Hong Kong Type in 2010 (O/MYA/7/98(DQ164925).

Miyazaki Prefecture started to recruit new staff members throughout the prefecture in view of the workers' fatigue from their continuous fight against the virus. The Vice Minister of AFF Yamada, was reported to have said in an interview that "no additional instructions need to be given" regarding the FMD in Miyazaki.

On May 7, the Secretary-General of Democratic Party (DPJ) Ozawa visited Miyazaki Pref. In the 20 minutes meeting with Ozawa, the Governor Higashikokubaru made 9 requests including full compensations for the affected farmers but ended up being asked for cooperation on the Upper House election in July. No specific countermeasures were suggested by Ozawa.

43 infected cattle confirmed, 59,000 cattle to be slaughtered. Zen-Noh Ohita (Japan Agricultural Co-operatives in Ohita) canceled an auction of its livestock market in May.

On May 8, the Minister of AFF Akamatsu came back to Japan from the trip to South America (Cuba, Mexico, and Colombia but he participated in a supporters' meeting for Mr. Yoshitada Tomioka(DPJ) in Sano city in Tochigi Prefecture.

62,426 animals (swine 57,938, cattle and water buffalos 4,488) were targeted to be culled in 49 farms (Tsuno town and Kawaminami town in Koyu county, and Ebino city).

On May 9, the Vice Minister Funayama of the Ministry of AFF returned from Denmark. The Minister Akamatsu announced that he would visit Miyazaki pref. on May 12 to discuss preventing further spread of the virus. He postponed a trip to Akita Pref. It was disclosed that he would again listen to what the Chief Secretary Ozawa had heard earlier in Miyazaki and would not visit the infected areas.

The Yomiuri Shimbun (morning edition) issued an article on the outbreak in Miyazaki, which was the first written by the national media on the FMD in Miyazaki Pref.

On May 10, the Ministry of AFF announced that they started taking necessary steps to export pork to Hong Kong with permission issued by HK authorities. Pork produced outside of unloading and unmovable restricted areas would only be exported.

The Minister Akamatsu visited Miyazaki for the first time and had a meeting with the Governor Higashikokubaru, chief of local agricultural group, and chief of local government. The Minister said, "because of issues of the authorities, the central government cannot deal with all the problems. However, the important thing is to manage the situation. In this difficulty, cooperation is the only key." He also said, "please don't worry. We have made all efforts against the crisis. Luckily, we were able to contain the virus within a 3km range." On the other hand, an LDP lawmaker Tadahisa Furukawa (3rd district, Miyazaki) said to the Minister Akamatsu, "the affected areas are in disaster. Don't you know how many times we asked for the central government's help? We asked the Ministry of AFF and officials at the residence of Prime Minister if we could get help from them. I am here today expecting to hear answers from you." Then, an independent lawmaker Shusaburo Kawamura (1st district, Miyazaki) who belongs to the Democratic Party of Japan faction, approved of Akamatsu and said, "questions are answered concretely. You should know that PR yourself doesn't work."

On May 11, at the House of Representatives Committee on Agriculture, Forestry and Fisheries, the Liberal Democratic Party of Japan lawmaker Taku Eto described the Miyazaki farmers' hardships. He urged Hirotaka Akamatsu, the Minister of AFF, that they all should collaborate to fight against the FMD outbreak regardless of rising voices of farmers in Miyazaki seeking Akamatsu's dismissal (video available).

===== May 12 to 20 =====
On May 13, the House of Representatives Committee on AFF was held (video available). 18 suspected cases in cattle and swine in nine farms in Kawaminami and one in Ebino were reported, adding up to 86 confirmed cases of FMD with 82,000 animals of total culling target. The number of cases increased nine times more than that of ten days ago.

On May 13–14, six top stud bulls of stock raising industry in Miyazaki were evacuated to the Ohae farm vacant lot in Nishio shi (within the FMD control zone), 24 kilometers away from the Miyazaki Livestock Improvement Association. The bulls' names are Fukunokuni, Katsuhiramasa, Tadafuji, Hidekikuyasu, Mihonokuni, and Yasusigemori. The Association manages breeding of 55 seed bulls and the six prized bulls accounted for 90% of artificial breeding in the prefecture. The evacuation was carried out within the movement control zone as an exceptional measure endorsed by the central government, after a report of another case of FMD (found on 12 May 2010) in Kawaminami which is 2 kilometers away from the Association in Takanabe town. Originally they had been expected to move 40 kilometers to Nishimerason, but ended up moving 60 kilometers with an overnight camp to be away from a livestock breeding farm located near Nishimerason. Tadafuji, later found FMD positive, was one of the six bulls. Report dated 22 May 2010 says the bull had been showing the symptom of excessive saliva during the move and there was the possibility that Tadafuji may have spread the virus to the surroundings including five other top seed bulls.

221 people participated in the "Campus Meeting of Preventive Measures Against FMD" hosted by Miyazaki University FMD Countermeasure Organization (established on 21 April 2010).

(S/NJI-332) "No magic bullet for FMD prevention: Minister denies preventive killing", Mr. Hirotaka Akamatsu, Minister of Agriculture, Forestry and Fisheries stated Friday [14 May 2010] at a news conference after the cabinet meeting that there is no magic bullet in preventing foot-and-mouth disease [FMD], and reaffirmed his perception that the thorough countermeasures taken at present such as disinfection and destroying infected animals are important. He carefully opposed the idea suggested by Mr. Hideo Higashikokubaru, Governor of Miyazaki Prefecture of the preventive killing of all livestock including healthy animals in the specific area in case of worse epidemic, saying "I'm afraid it's unacceptable to kill healthy livestock. We have to think carefully about infringing someone's personal property."

"When will it end?" - more than 80,000 killed in FMD epidemic

As of today, 86 farms had FMD cases and the total number of cattle and pigs to be killed reached as many as 80,275. Mr. Akamatsu, Minister of Agriculture, Forestry and Fisheries who visited Miyazaki on 10 May 2010, emphasized that the national government will fully cover the loss of livestock, but farmers and people involved remain quite apprehensive about a spate of FMD cases. "We have no hope. We can't go on any longer." The representative of agricultural groups tearfully complained to Mr. Akamatsu about the plight of livestock farmers. Mr. Hideo Higashikokubaru, Governor of Miyazaki Prefecture repeatedly explained that the financial situation of livestock farmers dropped drastically compared with the situation 10 years ago, and requested an all-round support from the Japanese Government. There is no comparison between the epidemic we face today and the outbreak 10 years ago where [a significantly smaller number of animals were slaughtered]. "One of the causes of this widespread damage is that the outbreak occurred in an area with overcrowding livestock farms," the official of the prefecture pointed out. According to the source, more than a half of pigs in Kawaminami town which has the highest incidence of FMD cases has been decided to be destroyed, and the number of cattle to be destroyed will also reach a half of the town's herd. Japanese Self Defense Force is helping burying carcasses, but only about a half of the total cases finished burial.

On May 14, the House of Representatives Committee on AFF was held (video available).

The Russian Federal Service for Veterinary and Phytosanitary Surveillance proposed to ban import of livestock products from Japan (press-released on 17 May 2010).

Regarding Miyazaki governor Higashikokubaru's remark on the possibility of slaughtering all livestock including the uninfected in a certain area, Hirotaka Akamatsu, the Minister of Agriculture, Forestry and Fisheries for Japan, said, "I am not sure about killing healthy animals. We need to consider property rights infringement carefully" and showed his disagreement.

On May 15, Miyazaki and Kagoshima prefectures decided to suspend cattle and swine auctions for the moment.

A case of FMD in a cow was confirmed at the Miyazaki Livestock Improvement Association (Takanabe town). 49 Japanese black cattle including one legendary stud bull named Yasuhira (21 years old) and 259 fattening cattle for authorization fell into culling targets. The most valuable six seed bulls had been evacuated the previous day and the prefectural government decided to observe them for signs of infection.

More than 30,000 calves born in Miyazaki are brought outside the prefecture to produce 40% of Omi beef, 40% of Matsuzaka and part of Saga. It is said that raising a seed bull takes seven years with the remaining six, a severe blow to Miyazaki's stock raising industry. The total number of infected cases is 101 and total animals to be slaughtered 82,411.

On May 16, it was revealed that the culling stalled at the number of completed 49,198 (67% of all) and yet-to-be-culled 33,213 figured on 6 May 2010.

The Chief Cabinet Secretary, Hirofumi Hirano, and the Minister of State for Special Missions, Mizuho Fukushima, (then Consumer Affairs Minister) visited Miyazaki to have a meeting with Miyazaki governor Higashikokubaru. The governor handed them a petition on their support for business loss of livestock farmers. At the meeting with Fukushima, the governor asked her to take countermeasures against inaccurate rumors that could further hurt Miyazaki's businesses. The Minister Mizuho Fukushima approved of his request and said, "we will ask consumers to understand that the disease doesn't affect humans."

Total infected cases: 111. Total animals to be culled: 85,723 (cattle 8,212 and swine 77,511).

On May 17, FMD was confirmed at Miyazaki Prefectural College of Agriculture, the second case in Takanabe town. A suspected case in a cow was found in Shintomi town, which was later confirmed and culling started. Tsuno town, Kawaminami town, Takanabe town and Shintomo town lay vertically along the sea, from the north to the south in Miyazaki prefecture. The infection in Shintomi town meant that the virus had spread further to the south.

The Miyazaki City Phoenix Zoo decided to close temporarily in order to protect its animals from contracting the disease.

Prime Minister Hatoyama asked the AFF Minister Akamatsu on 17 May 2010 to use 100 billion yen from the government's reserve fund in the fiscal 2010 for measures to contain the disease and help the affected farmers economically. However, at a press conference held that day, the Deputy Finance Minister Yoshihiko Noda said, "the figure may change and it is not realistic to come up with 100 billion yen" and showed disagreement. Later on the same day, Hatoyama took back his remark on 100 billion and said the figure was indecisive. Hatoyama replaced the AFF Minister Akamatsu as the Chief Director of FMD Control Response Department at the meeting held that night. The Senior Vice Farm Minister Masahiko Yamada became the Director of FMD Countermeasures Team including Special Advisor to the Prime Minister Katsuya Ogawa, 19 staff members, Director-General of Food Safety and Consumer Affairs Bureau Hirao and others. They would be stationed in Miyazaki and work as three teams. The government was recognized as considering an exceptional measure and the Finance Ministry as contemplating financial aid to the prefecture by 10 to 20 billion yen.

Total infected cases: 126. Total livestock to be slaughtered: 114,177 (cattle and water buffalos 8,564, sheep 4, and swine 105,519.)

On May 18, the Miyazaki governor Higashikokubaru declared a state of emergency. The AFF Ministry's Panel of Experts unofficially contacted Miyazaki prefecture on vaccination and culling all livestock within a 10 km radius of affected farms. They also planned to buy all livestock within a 20 km radius for meat processing and discard. The AFF Ministry announced suspected cases of infection were found in farms in Kawaminami town, Takanabe town, and Shintomi town (press-released case 112 to 116, 127 to 131.) It was the first case in Shintomi town.

The Hokkaido Holstein Agricultural Cooperation decided to postpone Japan's largest Livestock Exhibition (September 2010) until 2011. Hyogo prefecture decided to move half of 12 Tajima seed bulls and two-months supply of frozen semen from Kasai-shi to Asago-shi. Miyazaki prefecture evacuated 16 stud bull candidates (one-year-olds) in a beef processing capacity inspection center in Takaharu town to Takachiho town. The Agriculture, Forestry and Fisheries Department of Asahi-shi in Chiba prefecture said lime hydrate for disinfection had been out of stock since they had distributed 1,500 bags of it on 30 April 2010. Total infected cases: 131. Total animals to be slaughtered: 118,164. Uncompleted animals: approximately 60,000.

On May 19, the government's FMD Control Response Department announced a "basic countermeasure policy" that includes vaccination and slaughtering all livestock within a 10 km radius of major affected areas. It was predicted that over 300,000 of cattle and swine would be culled.

The Liberal Democratic Party lawmaker Yasukazu Hamada, Deputy Chairman of Diet Affairs Committee, revealed that the AFF Minister Akamatsu had left Japan regardless of his suggestion to postpone the overseas trip in order to plan for countermeasures against the outbreak. At the House of Representatives Committee on Foreign Affairs (No. 15), the Liberal Democratic Party lawmaker Itsunori Onodera questioned the AFF Minister Akamatsu's trip. He said the trip to Mexico, Cuba and Colombia was not an urgent matter and "meeting Castro in the preceding socialist country was the Minister's true purpose." He also criticized that the travel was personally important to Akamatsu, not to the Japanese government, and the Minister had forced his way through going abroad "ignoring the FMD-stricken farmers in Miyazaki."

Kagoshima prefecture decided to evacuate 12 stud bulls of the valuable Kagoshima brand Black cattle dispersedly to Kuchinoerabu Island (Yakushima town) and Tanega Island, 100 km away from Kagoshima-shi. Part of their semen also would be dispersed (storage destination not disclosed.)

On May 20, the Vice Farm Minister Yamada in the Ministry of AFF and chiefs from 2 cities and 7 towns including Kawaminami in Miyazaki discussed basic countermeasures on FMD; vaccinating and slaughtering all livestock within a 10 km range. The chiefs required negotiations with the livestock farmers, and a concrete statement from the central government because they cannot receive understanding from the affected farmers without a promise of compensation for their loss. Although the Vice Farm Minister Yamada had expressed in a previous day's interview that he would seek the farmers' understanding, he changed the remark after the meeting and said, "vaccination can be carried out without their consent". The Governor Higashikokubaru who joined the meeting said, "I want Prime Minister Hatoyama to show us an outline of compensation that the local farmers would agree." He said that legally it may be possible to vaccinate whether they agree or not, but it is difficult to do so without consent of all self-governing bodies.

The Democratic Party of Japan launched discussion of economic recovery payment for the livestock farmers who would lose all animals by slaughtering; 59,000 yen per cow and 12,000 yen per swine.

The Liberal Democratic Party (LDP) decided to submit a vote of nonconfidence motion of the Minister Akamatsu by the following week to the House of Representatives. The Minister had been traveling overseas while the FMD deepened. Chairman of Policy Bureau Shigeru Ishiba and Yasukazu Hamada, Deputy Chairman of LDP Diet Affairs Committee in the House of Councillors, criticized him. At the House of Representatives Financial Administration Committee, the Lower House member Toshiko Abe also criticized Akamatsu for his having left Japan ignoring the LDP's suggestion to stay and work on the disaster. The AFF Minister said he felt annoyed for being recognized as though he had walked off his job and said that the travel was not personal. Yasumasa Shigeno, Secretary General of the Social Democratic Party (the DPJ's coalition) expressed that Akamatsu was the first to be blamed for the outbreak and the Minister of State for Special Missions Mizuho Fukushima the second, and if their initial actions on the virus were inadequate, they must take the consequences.

The Liberal Democratic Party decided to submit by the following week an exceptional measure bill that the government would fully compensate the affected farmers who had lost their livestock by slaughter.

The 159th infected animals found, 13,258 would be slaughtered. 72,776 completed (56% of all targets), 57,482 yet to be culled.

The LDP lawmaker Taku Eto questioned the Minister Akamatsu about the FMD crisis at a plenary session of the House of Representatives (video available). Disinfection mattresses were placed near the border between Hyuga city and Tsuno town on the Route 10, and near the Japan Agricultural Co-operatives (JA) Hyuga Mimitsu branch.

===== May 21 to 31 =====
On May 21, the Japanese government declined an offer by the Food and Agriculture Organization (FAO) to send Miyazaki prefecture a specialist team to help contain the virus.

The Democratic Party of Japan decided to submit by the following week an exceptional measure bill that would fully compensate for losses of farmers forced to slaughter their livestock on an estimated cost basis.

Tadafuji, (7 years old, BMS [Beef Marbling Standard] 7.3) one of 6 ace stud bulls who had been evacuated into sheds in the Ohae ranch in Saito city, was confirmed to be infected with FMD as both PCR test results, conducted on May 19 and 20, showed positive and became a culling target. The other 5 bulls would be observed for signs of infection. (The rough-natured Tadafuji was separated in a shed 2m away from them, leaving one shed vacant between that of Tadafuji and the others.) Generally all would be slaughtered since they had been in the same building, but concern for extinction of Miyazaki's calves by doing so resulted in endorsing the exceptional measure.

The virus spread to Saito city (2 cases) and Kijyo town (1 case). New restriction zone was set up.

Hokkaido established the FMD Preventive Measures Department headed by Deputy Governor Yoji Takahara.

A hole was found on a plastic 500 liter disinfectant tank in Yamato town in Kumamoto prefecture. The prefecture assumed that someone had done it intentionally and submitted the local police department a damage report.

The 171st infected animals found, 133,011 to be slaughtered (17,370 cattle, 5 goats, and 115,636 swine).

On May 22, vaccination began. 27 veterinarians from outside of Miyazaki were main leaders of 27 teams which consisted of 3 members each. Target species would be 205,000 uninfected livestock (50,000 cattle and 155,000 swine) in 4 towns; Tsuno town, Kawaminami town, Takanabe town, and Shintomi town. They planned to finish it within 3–4 days.

The Governor Higashikokubaru revealed that he would request the government to cancel slaughter of the remaining 49 stud bulls in Takanabe town.

After more than a month of the first infection, the Prime Minister Hatoyama received a report on the crisis from the AFF Minister Akamatsu and Special Advisor to the PM Ogawa and ordered them to "cooperate with local citizens and proceed quickly. Swift moves are crucial."

Total cases are 181, 136,265 animals to be slaughtered (17,734 cattle, 118,526 swine and 5 goats).

On May 23, the Japanese government refused to accept FMD specialists from FAO who would investigate the route of FMD.

77,500 livestock in 90 farms were buried (including those of secured burial sites). Only 57% of all was completed.

The Senior Vice Farm Minister Masahiko Yamada expressed to the press that "an exceptional measure for the 49 stud bulls is unacceptable", and "it is outrageous that those bulls are still alive".

57 teams, expanded from 27 teams, vaccinated the livestock and 63,156, a half of target species, were completed.

Kawaminami, Tsuno, Shintomi, and Saito towns announced newly found cases. The 193rd case found, total 144,335 animals to be culled (18,561 cattle, 125,759 swine, 7 goats, and 8 sheep). The government began considering to lift restrictions in Ebino city and to recognize the city as FMD-free.

On May 24, the Director of FMD Countermeasures Team Yamada talked with the Prime Minister Hatoyama, the Chief Cabinet Secretary Hirano, and the Minister of AFF Akamatsu and confirmed their agreement on the 49 stud bulls' slaughter. (The Miyazaki Governor Higashikokubaru requested a "special procedure beyond the law").

Total 200 infected cases, 145,358 to be slaughtered (19,303 cattle, 126,040 swine, 7 goats, and 8 sheep).

One cow was found infected, the 197th case, at the Miyazaki Prefectural Takanabe Agricultural High School (Animal Husbandry Department; boarding school with 90 students. Total breeding animals; 281 swine, 53 cattle, 93 piglets, and 12 calves). FMD prevention work had started in the evening of the 23rd. The school temporarily would be closed from May 24 to 26.

On May 25, the AFF Minister Akamatsu said, "I didn't say that I regret nothing. I do feel sorry that the virus has spread widely as a result."

Total 209 infected cases, 147,894 animals (19,720 cattle, 128,159 swine, 7 goats, and 8 sheep), 9 cases in Kawaminami, Tsuno, Shintomi, Kijo towns. Yahoo Volunteer, an internet donation site, raised 20,820,108 yen from 41,563 viewers.

On May 26, the U.N. Food and Agriculture Organization (FAO) reported that the FMD outbreak in Miyazaki prefecture was "the world's worst epidemic in the past ten years" and requested Japanese government to contain the virus nationwide so that it won't spread outside Japan. The AFF Ministry revealed that it had declined FAO's offer to send international experts on FMD to Miyazaki at the request of Japan.

Total infected cases: 218. Total animals to be slaughtered: 152,357 (cattle 22,438, swine 129,903, goats 8, and sheep 8), 6 in Kawaminami town and 1 in Tsuno town. Vaccinated 10 animals included.

The ProMED Mail placed a comment by Arnon Shimshony of the International Society for Infectious Diseases that "this may pose, among other things, a biosecurity problems, since the vaccinators could have unknowingly transmitted the virus to other visited holdings, in case they proceeded their vaccination activities the same day".

An exceptional measure bill drafted based on that of the Liberal Democratic Party to stop further spread of the virus was approved at the House of Representatives Committee on agriculture, forestry and fisheries. It passed as a legislation of specified duration (this time for two years) and as a legislation introduced by Diet members of the Democratic Party of Japan, the Liberal Democratic Party of Japan, and the New Komeito. The bill includes that the government is entitled to forcibly slaughter uninfected animals and bury them, and the release of 100 billion yen budget figure for compensation for the affected farmers and slaughtering fees. The Liberal Democratic Party shelved no-confidence motion against the AFF Minister Akamatsu considering compromise offered by the Democratic Party of Japan on the bill.

99.5% of vaccination ended (124,698 animals out of 125,200). No agreements from 12 farmers yet. Vaccination team consisting of three members enhanced to 80 teams.

Donations in 2009 at the Tokyo branch "Shinjuku Miyazaki-kan Konne" had totaled approximately 4 million yen including the "hometown tax", but the amount raised from 7 May 2010 to 24 May 2010 already exceeded 2.8 million yen. 3.55 million yen was also donated to Kawaminami town in Miyazaki prefecture, seven times more than the previous year's total donation to the town.

On May 27, the Miyazaki FMD Donation collected 477,105,204 yen as of 27 May 2010. Total infected cases: 221. Total animals to be culled: 152,403 (cattle 22,484, swine 129,903, goats 8, and sheep 8). 91,846 livestock completed (60% of all targets) and 60,557 uncompleted (8,000 left stranded without burial sites). 5,856 terminated a day.

Ehime prefecture's officials held a training session on FMD in Miyazaki. "One cow needed four adults for slaughtering", "a health inspector was hit by a cow that didn't have enough drug effects" were disclosed at the session.

On May 28, an exceptional measure bill was unanimously approved by the House of Councilors and the FMD counterplan legislation was established.

Approximate payments for compensation to farmers that had finished slaughtering started. Yahoo Volunteer, a donation website, raised 24,825,418 yen from 50,088 viewers. Total infected cases: 224. Total animals to be culled: 155,182 (cattle 22,547, swine 132,619, goats 8, and sheep 8). New cases found in Kawaminami town and Takanabe town.

The Liberal Democratic Party, the New Komeito, the Your Party, and the Sunrise Party of Japan submitted no-confidence motion against the AFF Minister Akamatsu to the House of Representatives.

The Director of FMD Countermeasures Team Yamada exchanged opinions with Miyazaki governor and others at the Kyusyu Regional Agricultural Administration Office. He revealed that "I asked them to work hard on disinfection and protection against the disease, now that the virus is likely to spread to the next prefectures. I also asked them to have some land lots owned by the prefecture ready for use as burial sites in case the spread deepened."

Associate professor of Gifu University Yasuo Inoshima, who had worked on diagnoses, antibody tests, and protection measures against FMD in Miyazaki prefecture in 2000 as Senior Researcher of the National Institute of Animal Health, said "the virus in 2000 was not as much contagious and they succeeded in containing it back then. That experience may have affected measures against the disease, resulting in the slow move." He also mentioned "it is impossible to diagnose FMD with only fever and diarrhea. We should not blame one vet for the crisis by saying 'he misdiagnosed the disease and let the virus spread.' It was not triggered by the farmers either."

Kumamoto prefecture submitted the local police station an offense report that someone had made a hole on an FMD disinfection tank in Yamato town on 21 May 2010. Later on 28 May 2010, they dropped the charge after a police report that it may have occurred by vent heat from a disinfectant spray machine.

On May 29, the Japan Cattle Industry Cooperative and the Japan Swine Association requested Miyazaki prefecture to slaughter the evacuated six top stud bulls. They criticized the prefecture for its asking to save the 49 seed bulls and neglecting to report on the FMD to the central government by saying that "it is not only a betrayal to the sacrificed and all Japanese livestock producers, but also outrageous in view of the epidemiology." They continued that "saving the (FMD-prone) seed bulls will discourage the livestock producers in other prefectures from visiting Miyazaki to buy its calves for fear of infection."

The number of buried animals reached around 100,000 as of 28 May 2010. Approximately 180,000 more livestock expected to be culled including vaccinated cattle and swine. A total of 280,000 would be slaughtered (60ha burial lots needed). Total infection cases: 232. Total animals to be culled: 162,159 (cattle 28,669, swine 133,474, goats 8, and sheep 8), 4 cases in Kawaminami town, Tsuno town 1, Takanabe town 3 (391 animals added to the 158th case). All newly infected cases vaccinated.

On May 30, the market value of calves in Japan jumped 9% reaching a wholesale price of 390,000 yen. Livestock producers ended up purchasing low-ranked calves due to the decreased number of them by 80% compared to the previous year.

The AFF Minister Akamatsu paid the second visit to Miyazaki prefecture and dropped into the Prefectural Office, the Shintomi Town Office, and some farms. He apologized to the Miyazaki governor by saying that "the virus spread has not stopped. I regret this whole situation" and asked the governor to finish slaughtering the rest of the culling targets, 55,000 in total, within the week. Total infected cases: 238. Animals to be culled: 163,492 (cattle 30,002, swine 133, 474, goats 8, and sheep 8). New cases: 6. Kawaminami town 1, Tsuno town 2, Shintomi town 2, Saito town 1 (vaccination of all cases conducted from 24 May 2010 to 26 May 2010).

On May 31, Yahoo Volunteer, a donation website, raised 26,515,986 yen from 54,386 viewers. The 49 top stud bulls in Miyazaki, including the legendary Yasuhira, were slaughtered with only five other prized seed bulls left. The remaining five had been evacuated into the two newly built cattle sheds in the Ohae ranch in Saito city. Total cases: 247. Total animals to be culled: 164,057 (cattle 30,567, swine 133,474, goats 8, and sheep 8). 4 cases found in Kawaminami town, Tsuno town 4, Takanabe 1. A total number of livestock waiting to be culled reached 277,055 including vaccinated cattle and swine.

Miyazaki prefecture announced the General Fund Budget Amendment of 42,621.53 million yen as FMD countermeasures expenditures. Later the figure swelled into 54,231.69 million yen in the fourth amendment.

  - 家畜の移動制限区域にある「ミヤチク」都農工場で搬出制限区域から受入れた家畜の食肉処理を開始 The Miyachiku plant in Tsuno located within a movement control zone started slaughtering livestock brought in from the unloading restricted area.

==== June ====
By June 30, Japan had culled and buried all vaccinated animals.

==== July ====
On July 4, a report suggested that foot-and-mouth disease (FMD) could infect human. However, the Ministry of AFF denied these claims.

On July 16, a cattle farmer Mr. Komoda (Takanabe town) made an announcement that he approved of slaughtering his prized 6 stud bulls so that the central government could lift restrictions in the infected area. The media reported this decision would help hasten the restart of Miyazaki Wagyu beef exports.

Mr. Komoda had been resisting against slaughtering them who come from the line of Yasuhira, a legendary Miyazaki stud bull.

According to reports, the economic damage by losing them would be more than 70 billion yen.

==== August ====
On August 26, Miyazaki governor Higashikokubaru announced that the Foot-Mouth disease was eradicated. It took lives of about 290,000 cattle.

== Impact on the Japanese beef industry ==
On April 20, 2010, the export of all Japanese beef was banned. On April 21, local government was confused because the Japanese Government gave no instructions. There was not enough of disinfectant prepared by a local agricultural union to be distributed to all the farmers. Miyazaki Livestock Improvement Association stopped producing sperm straws which make up the major part of Japan's production (15,000 a year). The amount of stock in distribution would last for 2 months; remaining stocks for about 1 year.

== See also ==
South Korea foot-and-mouth outbreak in 2010
