= Merial =

Animal health company

- Company type: Limited
- Industry: Animal healthcare
- Founded: 1997
- Defunct: December 31, 2016
- Fate: Acquired by Boehringer Ingelheim
- Headquarters: Lyon, France

Merial was a multinational animal health company in Lyon, France. It was founded in 1997 as a joint venture between Merck & Co. and Sanofi-Aventis. In January 2017, Merial was acquired by Boehringer Ingelheim and merged with Boehringer Ingelheim's existing animal health assets.

== Overview ==
In August 1997, Merial started as a joint venture between the animal health subsidiaries of Merck & Co. (MSD AgVet) and Sanofi-Aventis (Rhône-Mérieux). Merial became the animal health division of Sanofi, when Sanofi bought out Merck's 50% share of the joint venture. On December 30, 2016 Boehringer Ingelheim completed a swap of their OTC business for Sanofi's animal health business. Merial is now owned by Boehringer Ingelheim and combined with their animal health business, Boehringer Ingelheim Vetmedica, to form Boehringer Ingelheim Animal Health.

Merial produces many products and vaccines for domestic pets, farm animals and wildlife. Merial has about 6,900 employees and is present in more than 150 countries in the world. Their sales in 2015 were about €2.5 billion. Some of Merial's most popular products are Frontline, Heartgard, NexGard, Ivomec, PureVax and Previcox.

In October 2009, Merial announced it was investing 70 million US$ at its poultry vaccines plant in Nanchang Hi-tech Development Zone, China. On March 9, 2010, Sanofi-Aventis announced it had exercised an option to combine Merial with Intervet/Schering Plough, the animal health business of Merck. The new joint venture would be equally owned by Merck and Sanofi-Aventis. On March 22, 2011, they announced the mutual termination of their agreement to form a new animal health joint venture.

In 2017, Merial merged with Boehringer Ingelheim.

== Investigations ==
Merial was investigated in connection with a 2007 United Kingdom foot-and-mouth outbreak, after a strain of foot-and-mouth disease alleged to have been sourced from one of their research facilities was found at Pirbright, a farm in Surrey, England, in August 2007. The investigators concluded that "release was most likely due to escape of live virus from the drainage system that connects the vaccine production plant to the sodium hydroxide treatment tanks on another part of the Pirbright site."

The two independent inquiries found that Merial complied with all regulations and committed no breaches of biosecurity.

In 2016, the NOAH Code of Practice Committee found Merial Animal Health to be in breach of 2 out of 4 items under complaint. This related to the promotion of NexGard Spectra® to the veterinary profession by both account managers and technical teams via telephone conversations and webinars from February 2016 onwards.
