= Biosafety Level 4 Zoonotic Laboratory Network =

The Biosafety Level 4 Zoonotic Laboratory Network is an international consortium of Biosafety Level 4 research laboratories. Its members are

- National Centre for Foreign Animal Disease (Canada)
- National Bio and Agro-Defense Facility (United States)
- Pirbright Institute (United Kingdom)
- Friedrich Loeffler Institute (Germany)
- CSIRO Australian Animal Health Laboratory (Australia)
