= Biosafety level =

Set of biocontainment precautions

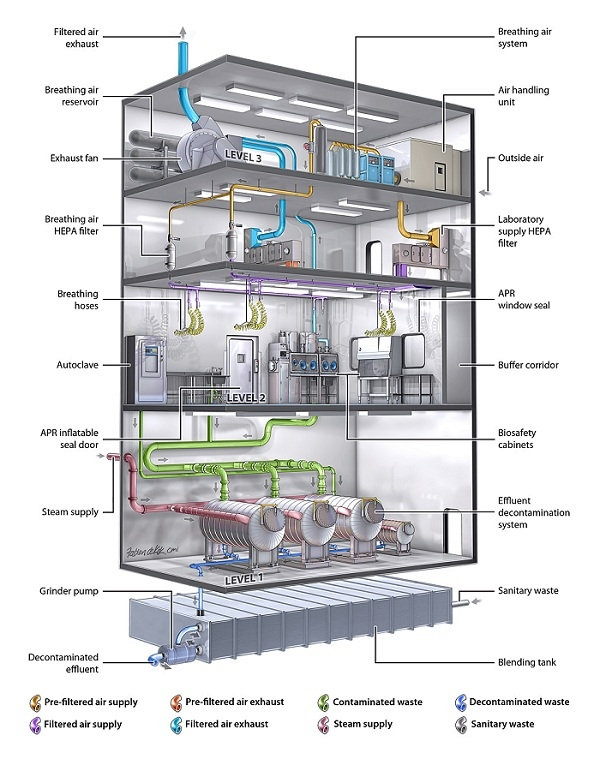
Essential features of a biosafety level 4 (BSL-4) laboratory

A biosafety level (BSL), or pathogen/protection level, is a set of biocontainment precautions required to isolate dangerous biological agents in an enclosed laboratory facility. The levels of containment range from the lowest biosafety level 1 (BSL-1) to the highest at level 4 (BSL-4). In the United States, the Centers for Disease Control and Prevention (CDC) have specified these levels in a publication referred to as Biosafety in Microbiological and Biomedical Laboratories (BMBL). In the European Union (EU), the same biosafety levels are defined in a directive. In Canada the four levels are known as Containment Levels. These are sometimes expressed as equivalent pathogen/protection levels P1 through P4, as in the term P3 laboratory, which is the same as a BSL-3 laboratory.

At the lowest level of biosafety, precautions may consist of regular hand-washing, other hygienic practices, and minimal protective equipment. At higher biosafety levels, precautions may include airflow systems, multiple containment rooms, sealed containers, positive pressure personnel suits, in-lab sterilization or containment equipment, established protocols for all procedures, extensive personnel training, and high levels of security to control access to the facility. Health Canada reports that world-wide until 1999 there were recorded over 5,000 cases of accidental laboratory infections and 190 deaths.

== History ==
The first prototype Class III (maximum containment) biosafety cabinet was fashioned in 1943 by Hubert Kaempf Jr., then a U.S. Army soldier, under the direction of Arnold G. Wedum, Director (1944–1969) of Industrial Health and Safety at the United States Army Biological Warfare Laboratories, Camp Detrick, Maryland. Kaempf was tired of his MP duties at Detrick and was able to transfer to the sheet metal department working with the contractor, the H.K. Ferguson Co.

On 18 April 1955, fourteen representatives met at Camp Detrick in Frederick, Maryland. The meeting was to share knowledge and experiences regarding biosafety, chemical, radiological, and industrial safety issues that were common to the operations at the three principal biological warfare (BW) laboratories of the U.S. Army. Because of the potential implication of the work conducted at biological warfare laboratories, the conferences were restricted to top level security clearances. Beginning in 1957, these conferences were planned to include non-classified sessions as well as classified sessions to enable broader sharing of biological safety information. It was not until 1964, however, that conferences were held in a government installation not associated with a biological warfare program.

Over the next ten years, the biological safety conferences grew to include representatives from all federal agencies that sponsored or conducted research with pathogenic microorganisms. By 1966, it began to include representatives from universities, private laboratories, hospitals, and industrial complexes. Throughout the 1970s, participation in the conferences continued to expand and by 1983 discussions began regarding the creation of a formal organization. The American Biological Safety Association (ABSA) was officially established in 1984 and a constitution and bylaws were drafted the same year. As of 2008, ABSA includes some 1,600 members in its professional association.

In 1977, Jim Peacock of the Australian Academy of Science asked Bill Snowdon, then chief of the CSIRO's Australian Animal Health Laboratory (AAHL) to have the requirements for the development of bio-containment infrastructure (newly released by the United States' National Institutes of Health and the British equivalent) reviewed by AAHL personnel. The hope was that one of these these standards might be adopted by Australian authorities. The review was carried out by CSIRO AAHL Project Manager Bill Curnow and CSIRO Engineer Arthur Jenkins. They drafted outcomes for each of the levels of security, with AAHL notionally classified as "substantially beyond P4". The standards were adopted by the Australian Academy of Science and became the basis for Australian legislation. AAHL opened in 1985, built near the former site of built on Corio Oval, costing AU$185 million. Now known as the Australian Centre for Disease Preparedness, this facility is a Class 4/ P4 Laboratory.

By the 1980s Canadian authorities had noted the need for new laboratory space to meet an increasing demand for BSL-4 work. This resulted in the 1999 opening of the Canadian Science Centre for Human and Animal Health (CSCHAH) in Winnipeg, Manitoba. In 2007 a journal dedication remembering its designers noted that CSCHAH "has become the prototype for modern BSL4 laboratories".

In 2003, the Chinese Academy of Sciences approved the construction of mainland China's first BSL-4 laboratory at the Wuhan Institute of Virology (WIV). In 2014, the WIV's National Bio-safety Laboratory was built at a cost of 300 million yuan (US$44 million), in collaboration and with assistance from the French government's CIRI lab.

Starting with the 2020 COVID-19 pandemic near the facilities of the WIV, work in biocontainment facilities has been politicized, especially in the US Senate for example as the result of Rand Paul's work. Russia asked questions on 25 October 2022 in the United Nations over the presence in Ukraine of biolabs. In April 2023, Sudan's descent into civil war caused worries at the World Health Organization over its National Public Laboratory in Khartoum, as it was in an area contested by several factions. NPL staff were forced out of the facility, which was then occupied by military forces. At the time, the facility contained organisms rated at BSL-2.

== Levels ==
=== Biosafety level 1 ===
Biosafety level 1 (BSL-1) is suitable for work with well-characterized agents which do not cause disease in healthy humans. In general, these agents should pose minimal potential hazard to laboratory personnel and the environment. At this level, precautions are limited relative to other levels. Laboratory personnel must wash their hands upon entering and exiting the lab. Research with these agents may be performed on standard open laboratory benches without the use of special containment equipment. However, eating and drinking are generally prohibited in laboratory areas. Potentially infectious material must be decontaminated before disposal, either by adding a chemical such as bleach or isopropanol or by packaging for decontamination elsewhere in the facility. Personal protective equipment is only required for circumstances where personnel might be exposed to hazardous material. BSL-1 laboratories must have a door which can be closed to limit access to the lab. However, it is not necessary for BSL-1 labs to be isolated from the general building.

This level of biosafety is appropriate for work with several kinds of microorganisms including non-pathogenic strains of Escherichia coli and Staphylococcus, Bacillus subtilis, Saccharomyces cerevisiae and other organisms not suspected to contribute to human disease. Due to the relative ease and safety of maintaining a BSL-1 laboratory, these are the types of laboratories generally used as teaching spaces for high schools and colleges.

=== Biosafety level 2 ===
At this level, all precautions used at Biosafety level 1 are followed, and some additional precautions are taken. BSL-2 differs from BSL-1 in that:

- "laboratory personnel have specific training in handling pathogenic agents and are directed by competent scientists."
- There must be a method for decontaminating all laboratory wastes available in the facility (e.g., autoclave, chemical disinfection, incineration, or other validated decontamination method)
- Access to the laboratory is limited when work is being conducted.
- Certain procedures in which infectious aerosols or splashes may be created are conducted in biological safety cabinets or other physical containment equipment.
- Extreme precautions are taken with contaminated sharp items, with non-disposable sharps placed in a hard-walled container prior to decontamination (either in the lab or elsewhere in the facility, preferably by autoclave).

Biosafety level 2 is suitable for work involving agents of moderate potential hazard to personnel and the environment. This includes various microbes that cause mild disease to humans, or are difficult to contract via aerosol in a lab setting. Examples of pathogens classified as "Risk Group 2" in the United States include seasonal influenza, SARS-CoV-2, hepatitis A, B, and C viruses, human immunodeficiency virus (HIV), pathogenic strains of Escherichia coli and Staphylococcus, Salmonella, Plasmodium falciparum, and Toxoplasma gondii. Notably, the European Union departs from the United States and classifies HIV and hepatitis B – G as Risk Group 3 agents best handled at BSL-3.

Prions, the infectious agents that transmit prion diseases such as vCJD, are typically handled under Biosafety Level 2 or higher. This is due to the lack of any evidence of aerosol transmission and relatively higher infective dose of prion diseases, though some circumstances (such as handling animal-infective prions in a facility which cares for vulnerable animals) would require BSL-3 conditions.

=== Biosafety level 3 ===
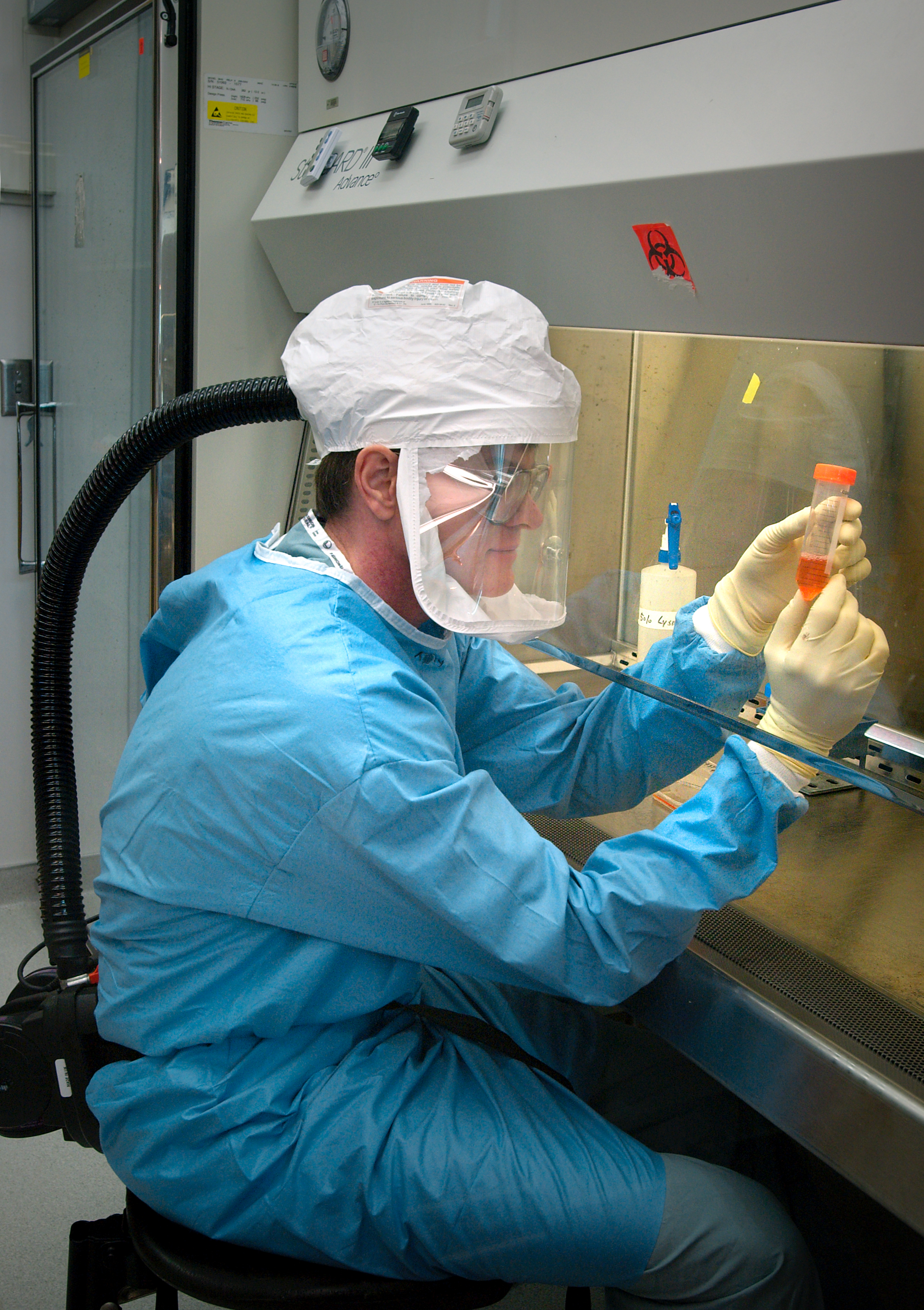
Dr Terrence Tumpey at US Centers for Disease Control, Atlanta, Georgia, US, working with influenza virus under biosafety level 3 conditions, with powered air-purifying respirator inside a biosafety cabinet (BSC).

Biosafety level 3 is appropriate for work involving microbes which can cause serious and potentially lethal disease via the inhalation route. This type of work can be done in clinical, diagnostic, teaching, research, or production facilities. Here, the precautions undertaken in BSL-1 and BSL-2 labs are followed, as well as additional measures including:

- A laboratory-specific biosafety manual must be drafted which details how the laboratory will operate in compliance with all safety requirements.
- All laboratory personnel are provided medical surveillance and offered relevant immunizations (where available) to reduce the risk of an accidental or unnoticed infection.
- All procedures involving infectious material must be done within a biosafety cabinet.
- Lab personnel must wear solid-front protective clothing (i.e. gowns that tie in the back). This cannot be worn outside of the lab and must be discarded or decontaminated after each use.

Also, the facility which houses the BSL-3 lab must have certain features to ensure appropriate containment. The construction of the lab is such that it can be easily cleaned. Carpets are not permitted, and any seams in the floors, walls, and ceilings are sealed to allow easy cleaning and decontamination. Also, windows must be sealed, and a ventilation system installed which forces air to flow from the "clean" areas of the lab to the areas where infectious agents are handled. Air from the lab must be filtered before it can be recirculated. The entrance to the lab must be separated from areas of the building with unrestricted traffic flow. Also, the lab must be behind two sets of self-closing doors (to reduce the risk of aerosols escaping). While it is not required that a validated decontamination method, such as an autoclave, be present in the BSL-3 lab itself, most elect to do so. This eliminates the transport risk that comes with moving BSL waste outside the containment area. As a practical matter, it also reduces liability and paperwork for labs, while meeting other regulatory requirements (for example, the NIH Design Requirements Manual requires waste be sterilized by autoclave within the containment barrier prior to leaving the BSL-3 lab.

A 2015 study by USA Today journalists, identified more than 200 lab sites in the U.S. that were accredited biosafety levels 3 or 4. Over the next decade, that number grew substantially: A 2025 study identified 3,515 BSL-3 laboratories in 149 countries, with 47.1% (roughly 1,643 labs) of in the United States. The Proceedings of a Workshop on "Developing Norms for the Provision of Biological Laboratories in Low-Resource Contexts" provides a list of BSL-3 laboratories in low-resource countries as of 2019.

Biosafety level 3 is commonly used for research and diagnostic work involving various microbes which can be transmitted by aerosol and/or cause severe disease. These include Francisella tularensis, Mycobacterium tuberculosis, Chlamydia psittaci, Venezuelan equine encephalitis virus, Eastern equine encephalitis virus, SARS-CoV-1, MERS-CoV, Coxiella burnetii, Rift Valley fever virus, Rickettsia rickettsii, several species of Brucella, chikungunya, yellow fever virus, West Nile virus, and Yersinia pestis.

=== Biosafety level 4 ===
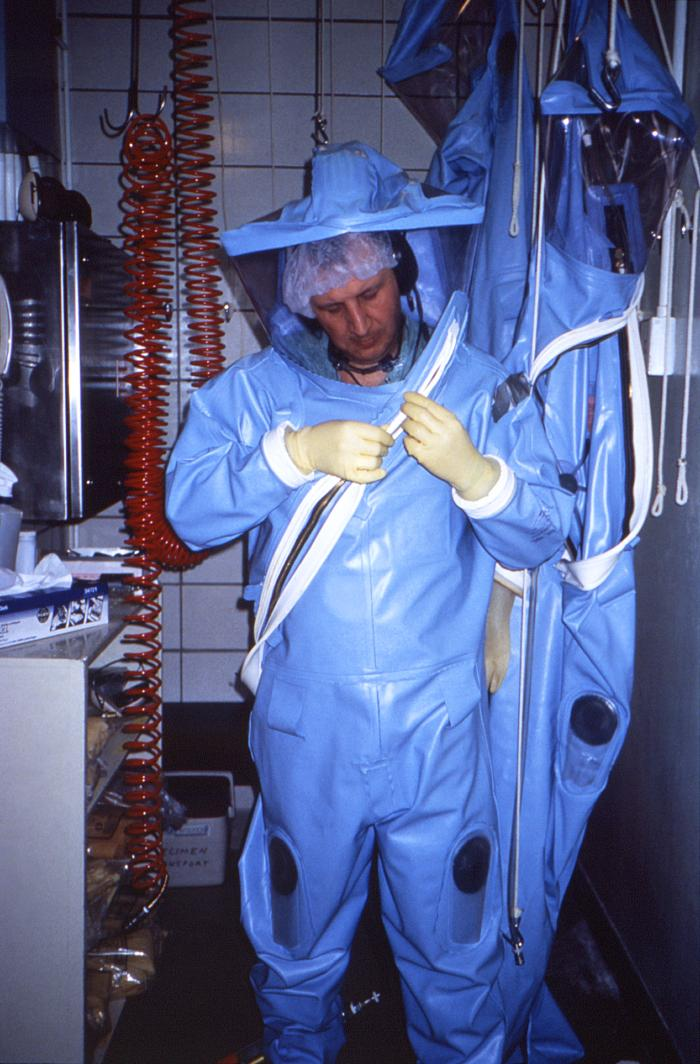
CDC technician dons an older-model positive-pressure suit before entering one of the CDC's earlier BSL-4 labs.

Biosafety level 4 (BSL-4) is the highest level of biosafety precautions, and is appropriate for work with agents that could easily be aerosol-transmitted within the laboratory and cause severe to fatal disease in humans for which there are no available vaccines or treatments. BSL-4 labs are generally set up to be either cabinet laboratories or protective-suit laboratories. In cabinet laboratories, all work must be done within a class III biosafety cabinet. Materials leaving the cabinet must be decontaminated by passing through an autoclave or a tank of disinfectant. The cabinets themselves are required to have seamless edges to allow easy cleaning. Also, the cabinet and all materials within must be free of sharp edges to reduce the risk of damage to the gloves. In a protective-suit lab, all work must be done in a class II biosafety cabinet by personnel wearing a positive pressure suit. To exit a BSL-4 lab, personnel must pass through a chemical shower for decontamination, then a room for removing the positive-pressure suit, followed by a personal shower. Entry into the BSL-4 lab is restricted to trained and authorized individuals, and all persons entering and exiting the lab must be recorded.

As with BSL-3 laboratories, BSL-4 labs must be separated from areas that receive unrestricted traffic. Also, airflow is tightly controlled to ensure that air always flows from "clean" areas of the lab to areas where work with infectious agents is being performed. The entrance to the BSL-4 lab must also employ airlocks to minimize the possibility that aerosols from the lab could be removed from the lab. All laboratory waste, including filtered air, water, and refuse must also be decontaminated before it can leave the facility.

Biosafety level 4 laboratories are used for diagnostic work and research on easily transmitted pathogens which can cause fatal disease. These include a number of viruses known to cause viral hemorrhagic fever such as Marburg virus, Ebola virus, Lassa virus, and Crimean-Congo hemorrhagic fever. Other pathogens handled at BSL-4 include Hendra virus, Nipah virus, and some flaviviruses. Also, poorly characterized pathogens which appear closely related to dangerous pathogens are often handled at this level until enough data is obtained either to confirm continued work at this level, or to permit working with them at a lower level. This level is also used for work with smallpox virus, though this work is only performed at the Centers for Disease Control and Prevention in Atlanta, United States, and the State Research Center of Virology and Biotechnology in Koltsovo, Russia.

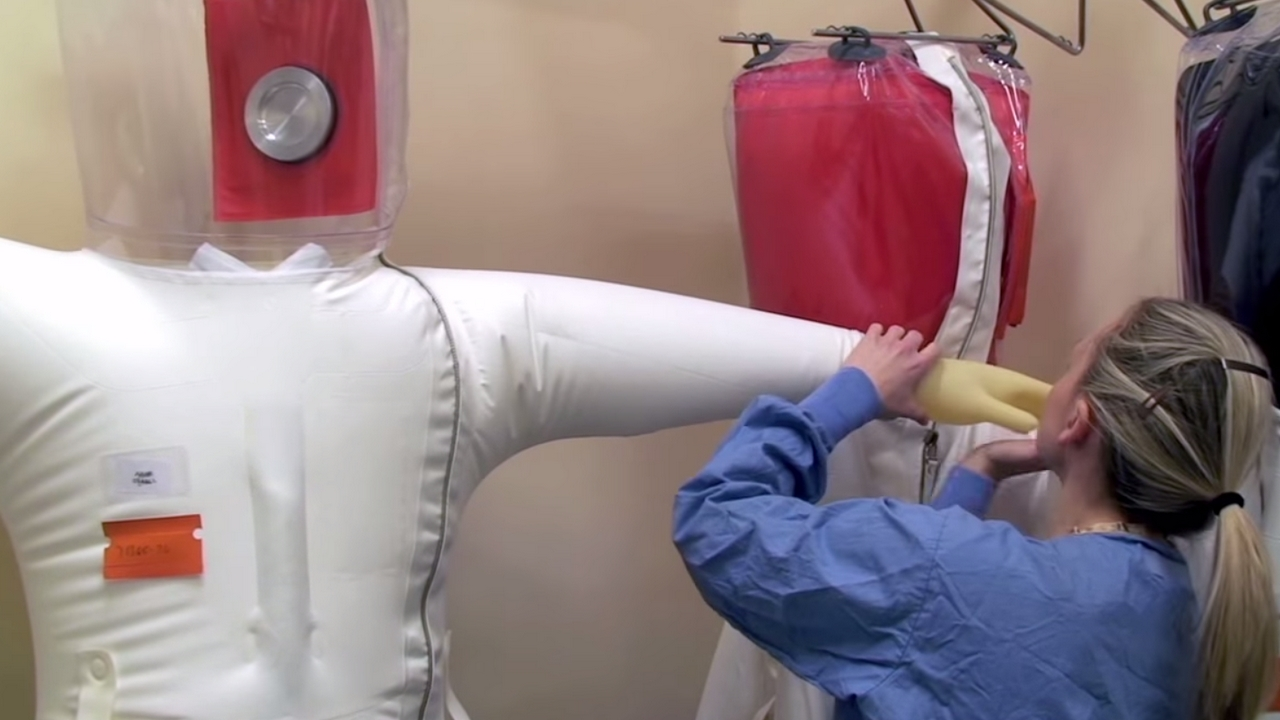
Regular inspection of positive-pressure suits to locate any leaks

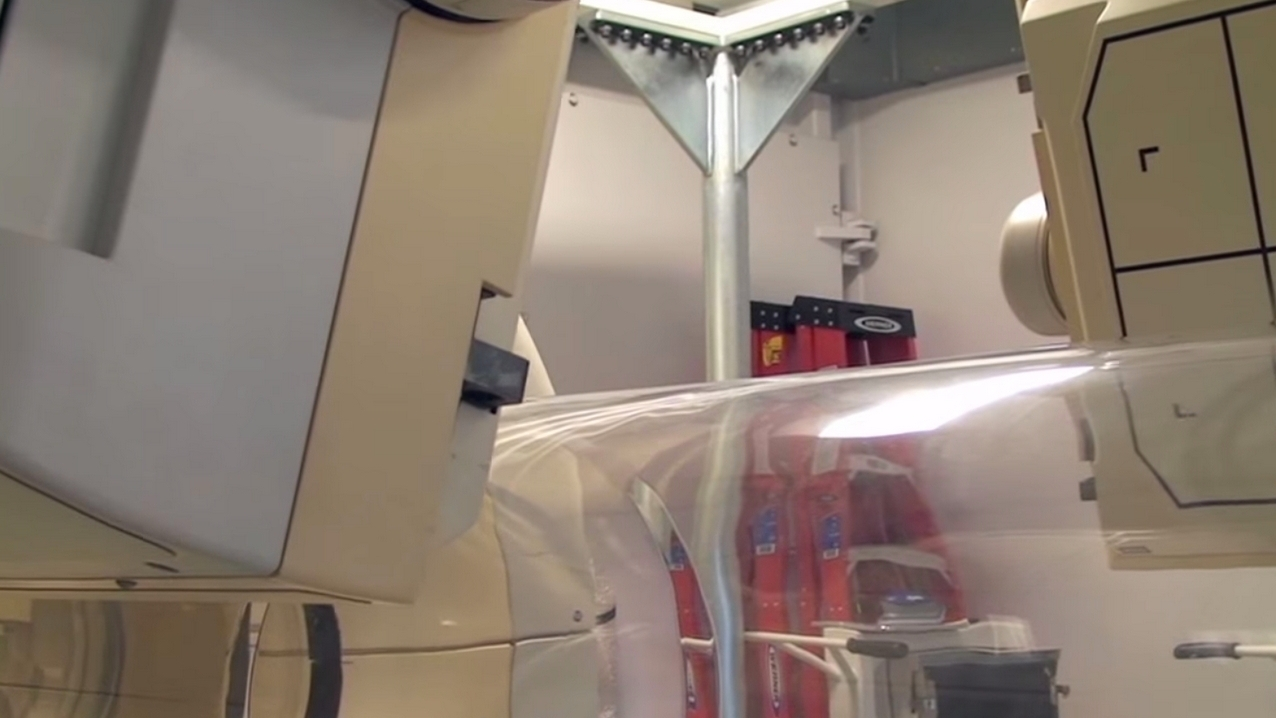
SPECT machine at BSL-4 imaging facility that separates subjects with pathogens from the machines

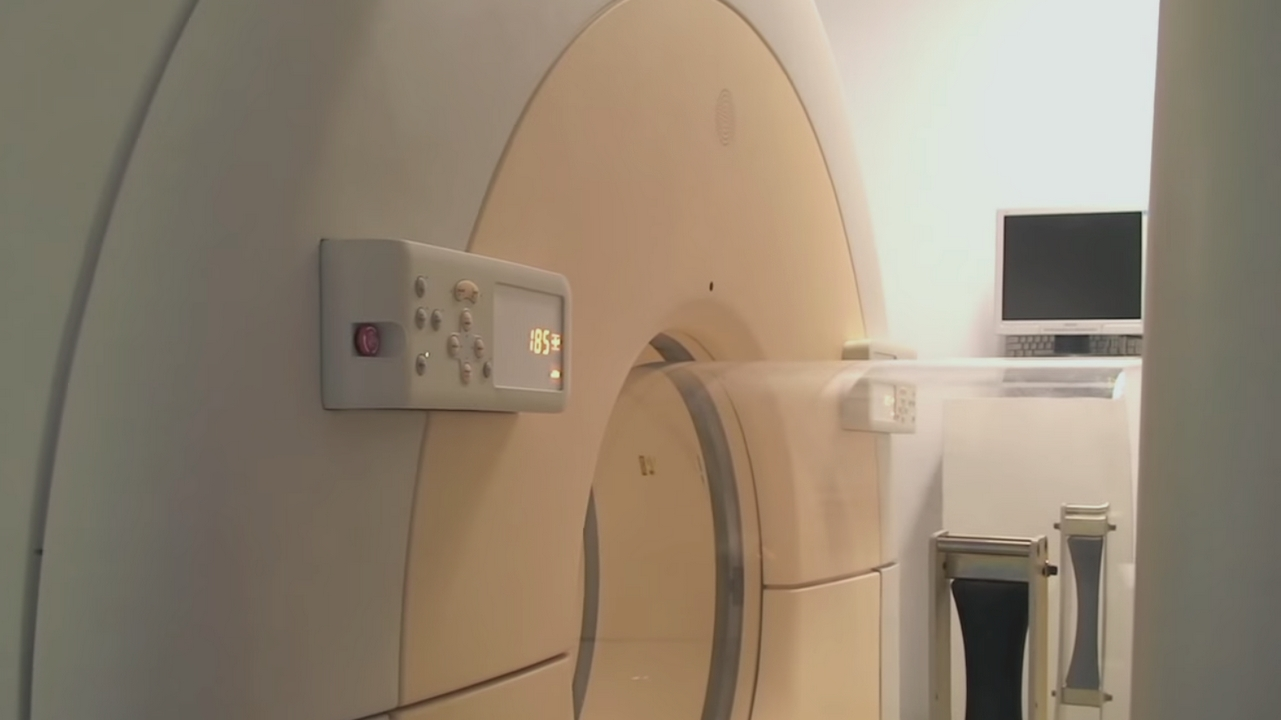
The circular containment tube separates the patient table in the "hot" zone (pathogen present) from the "cold" zone around this MRI machine.

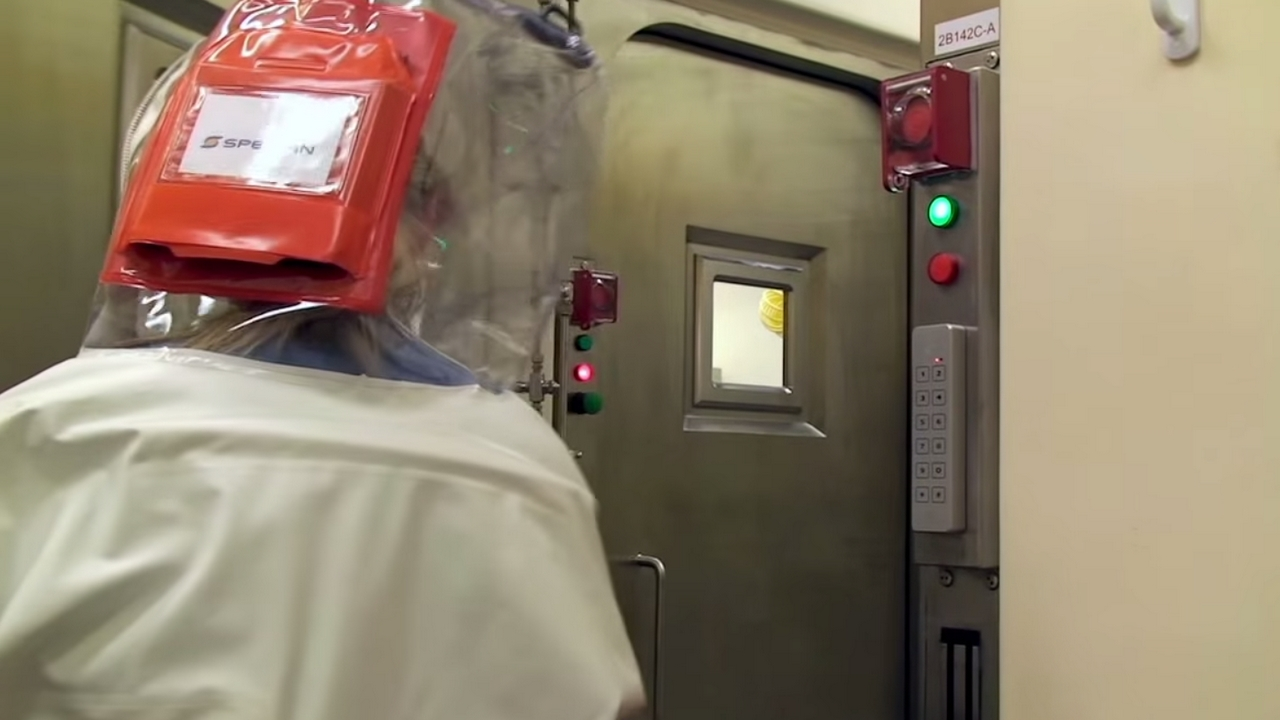
Air pressure resistant (APR) door to separate the hot and cold zones

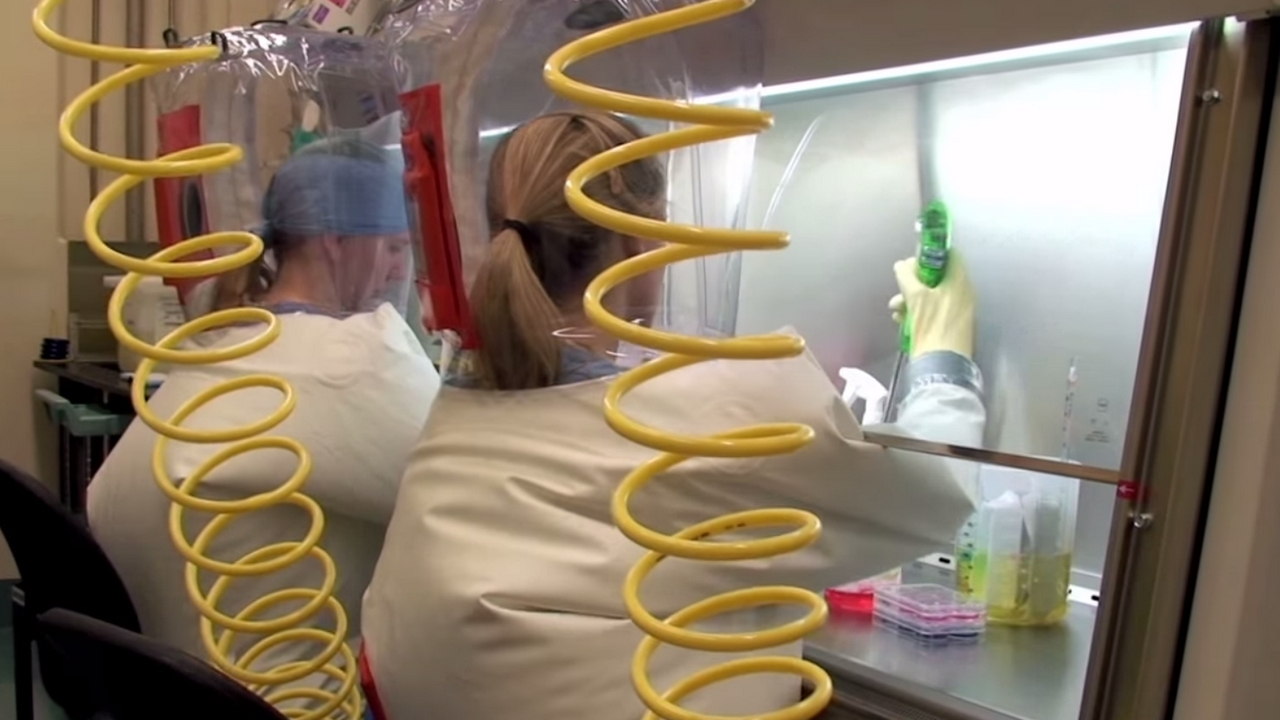
Working inside a BSL-4 lab with air hoses providing positive air pressure

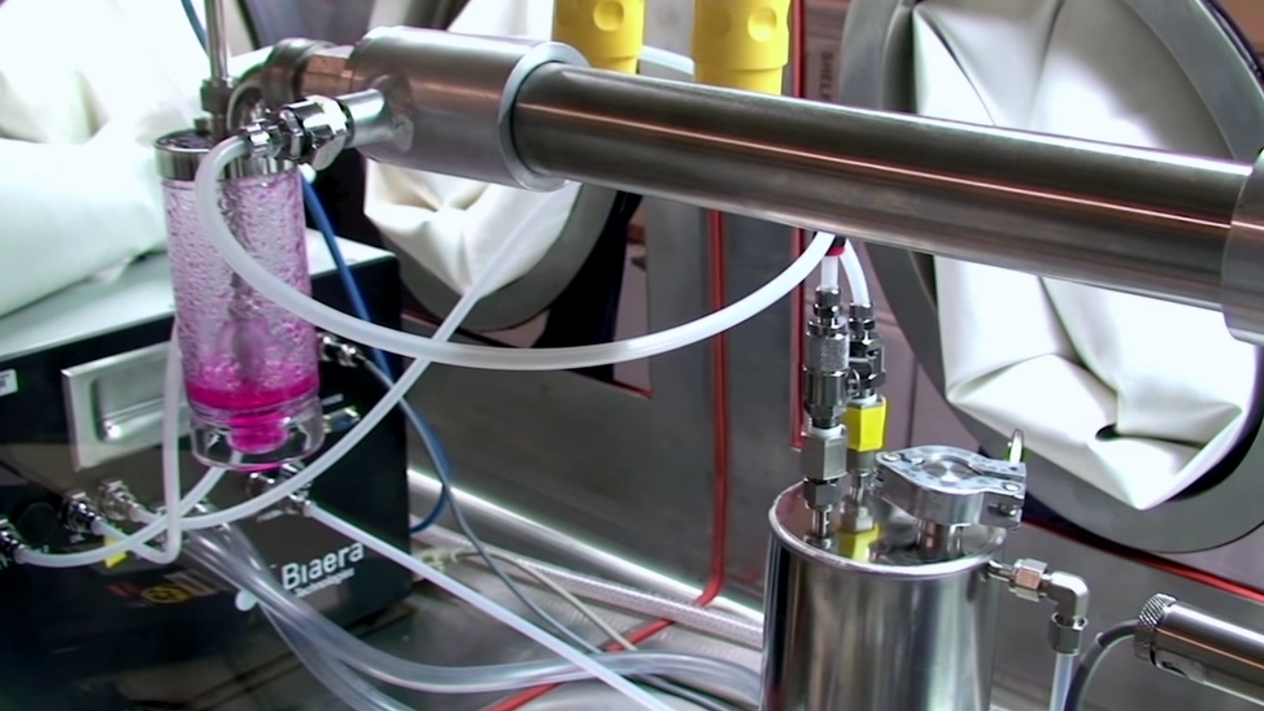
Inside a Class III biological safety cabinet with an aerosol control platform

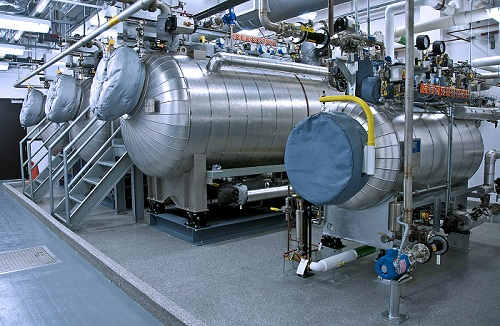
Effluent decontamination system of a BSL-4 lab of NIAID

==== BSL-4 facilities for extraterrestrial samples ====
Sample-return missions that bring samples from a Category V body back to Earth must be curated at facilities rated BSL-4. Because the existing BSL-4 facilities in the world do not provide the level of cleanliness needed for such pristine samples, there is a need to design a facility dedicated to curation of restricted (potentially biohazardous) extraterrestrial materials. The systems of such facilities must be able to contain unknown biohazards, as the size of any putative alien microorganism is unknown. Ideally, it should filter particles down to 10 nanometers, and release of a particle 50 nanometers or larger is unacceptable under any circumstance.

Because NASA and ESA are collaborating on the Mars Sample Return campaign, due to return samples from Mars in the early 2030s, the need for a Sample Receiving Facility (SRF) is becoming more pressing. An SRF is expected to take 7 to 10 years from design to completion, and an additional two years is recommended for the staff to become proficient and accustomed to the facilities.

== Safety concerns ==
A North Carolina Mosquito & Vector Control Association (NCMVCA) study highlighted safety concerns. In the United States, laboratories can be funded by federal, state, private, non-profit, or academically. The last accounts for 72% of the funding.

High-containment labs that are registered with the Centers for Disease Control and Prevention (CDC) and the U.S. Department of Agriculture's (USDA) Select Agent Program must adhere to Department of Defense standards. Since BSL3 and 4 laboratories in the United States are regulated by either the CDC or USDA or another federal agency (depending on the pathogens they handle), no single federal agency is responsible for regulating or tracking the number of these labs. U.S. high-containment laboratories that handle pathogens which are declared as "select agents" must be inspected periodically by the CDC or USDA, adhere to certain standards, and maintain ongoing education on biosecurity and biosafety policies as mandated by law.

== Global Growth of BSL-3 and BSL-4 facilities ==
The number of BSL-3 and BSL-4 facilities has grown substantially in the 21st Century. This has become the cause of biosafety concerns, as there is no comprehensive register or global oversight of these facilities.

According to a U.S. Government Accountability Office (GAO) report published on 4 October 2007, at that time there were a total of 1,356 CDC/USDA registered BSL-3 facilities in the United States. Approximately 36% of these laboratories were located in academia. The GAO identified 15 BSL-4 facilities in the U.S. in 2007, including nine at federal labs. As of May 2021, there were 42 BSL-4 facilities in operation around the world, with a further 17 planned or under construction. By 2025, the number of US-based BSL-3 labs had grown substantially, to 1,643 labs. Likewise, as of 2025, there were at least 110 BSL-4 laboratories across 34 middle- and high-income countries, 17 of which were in the United States.

The following is a list of existing BSL-4 facilities worldwide.

Country	Location	Name	Date established	Description
Argentina	Buenos Aires	National Service of Healthcare and Agriculture Quality (SENASA)		Diagnostic laboratory for foot-and-mouth disease.
Australia	Geelong, Victoria	Australian Centre for Disease Preparedness	1985	Capable of housing from large experimental animals to insects under conditions that exceed all BSL 4 requirements. The antecedent of all such facilities developed since the 1980s. Arguably the most researched design and construction project ever. The ACDP is subdivided into a number of isolation zones that can be managed at differing containment levels concurrently. CSIRO AAHL Project Manager and Architect, William Curnow, provided technical reviews to Canadian, Indian, UK and French Authorities and consulted with Dr Jerry Callis [PIADC] to UN FAO on matters of bio-containment. Formerly known as the Australian Animal Health Laboratory (AAHL) and renamed to Australian Centre for Disease Preparedness April 2020
Australia	Melbourne, Victoria			
Australia	Melbourne, Victoria	Victorian Infectious Diseases Reference Laboratory		The Victorian Infectious Diseases Reference Laboratory at the Peter Doherty Institute for Infection and Immunity operates BSL-4 laboratories and serves as Australia's National High Security Quarantine Laboratory for human pathogens.
Belarus	Minsk	Republican Research and Practical Center for Epidemiology and Microbiology (RPPCM)		Formerly the SRIEM.
Brazil	Pedro Leopoldo, Minas Gerais	Laboratório Nacional Agropecuário de Minas Gerais (Lanagro/MG)	2014	Focus on Agropecuary diseases and diagnostics, like the foot-and-mouth disease.
Brazil	Campinas, São Paulo	Laboratório Nacional de Máxima Contenção Biológica (LNMCB)	2026 (expected)	It was announced in 2021 to be built near the Sincrotron lab.
Canada	Winnipeg, Manitoba	National Microbiology Laboratory	1999	Located at the Canadian Science Centre for Human and Animal Health, it is jointly operated by the Public Health Agency of Canada and the Canadian Food Inspection Agency.
Canada	Saskatoon, Saskatchewan	Vaccine and Infectious Disease Organization	2025 (estimated)	Operated by the University of Saskatchewan and located near the Canadian Light Source.
China	Wuhan, Hubei	Wuhan Institute of Virology of the Chinese Academy of Sciences	2015	Wuhan Institute of Virology has existed since 1956 and already hosted BSL-3 laboratories. A BSL-4 facility was completed in 2015, and became the first BSL-4 laboratory in China.
China	Harbin, Heilongjiang	Harbin Veterinary Research Institute of the Chinese Academy of Agricultural Sciences	2018	Harbin Veterinary Research Institute researches prevention and control of major infectious diseases. China's second, and the first for large animals, BSL-4 lab.
Czech Republic	Těchonín, Pardubice Region	Biological Defense Center	1971, rebuilt 2003–2007	Hospital and research facility. Located at the Centrum biologické ochrany (Biological Defense Center). Operated by Army of the Czech Republic.
France	Brétigny-sur-Orge, Essonne	French Armed Biomedical Research Institute, French Defence Health Service	2015	French Army laboratory.
France	Lyon, Metropolis of Lyon	Jean Mérieux BSL-4 Laboratory	1999	Built and owned by the Fondation Mérieux. Since 2004, operated by INSERM.
France	Vert-le-Petit, Essonne	French general directorate of armaments (DGA)	2013	Operated by the Ministry of Defense.
Gabon	Franceville, Haut-Ogooué Province	Centre International de Recherches Médicales de Franceville		This facility is operated by a research organization supported by both Gabonese (mainly) and French governments, and is West Africa's only P4 lab (BSL-4).
Germany	Berlin	Robert Koch Institute	2015	Diagnostic and experimental lab facility.
Germany	Hamburg	Bernhard Nocht Institute for Tropical Medicine	2014	Part of the Leibniz Center Infection. National reference lab for tropical viruses.
Germany	Greifswald, Mecklenburg-Vorpommern	Friedrich Loeffler Institute	2010	Focus on animal viral diseases and diagnostics.
Germany	Marburg, Hesse	Philipps University of Marburg	2008	Focuses on hemorrhagic fever viruses.
Hungary	Budapest	National Center for Epidemiology	1998	Division of Virology operates three WHO National Reference Laboratories. The BSL-4 biosafety laboratory provides a modern means to process dangerous imported zoonotic viral pathogens.
Hungary	Pécs, Baranya County	University of Pécs	2016	Opened in 2016, part of Szentágothai János Kutatóközpont.
India	Bhopal, Madhya Pradesh	National Institute of High Security Animal Disease	1998	This BSL-3+ facility deals especially to zoonotic organisms and emerging infectious disease threats.
India	Pune, Maharashtra	National Institute of Virology	2012	India's most advanced BSL-4 category lab.
Italy	Rome, Lazio	Istituto Nazionale per le Malattie Infettive	1997	The "National Institute of Infectious Diseases" used to operate within the Lazzaro Spallanzani hospital; the facility is now independent and is home to five BSL-3 labs as well as a single BSL-4 laboratory, which was completed in 1997.
Italy	Milan, Lombardy	Ospedale Luigi Sacco	2006	
Japan	Musashimurayama, Tokyo	National Institute for Infectious Diseases	2015	Located at National Institute for Infectious Diseases, Department of Virology I. Built in 1981; operated at BSL-3 until 2015 due to opposition from nearby residents.
Japan	Nagasaki, Nagasaki Prefecture	Nagasaki University	2021	Facility for the study of infectious diseases.
Japan	Tsukuba, Ibaraki Prefecture	Institute of Physical and Chemical Research (RIKEN)	1984	Facility completed in 1984 but not operated as BSL-4 due to local opposition.
Philippines	New Clark City, Capas, Tarlac	Virology Institute of the Philippines	2025	First BSL-4 lab in the Philippines when completed.
Russia	Sergiyev Posad, Moscow Oblast	48th Central Scientific Research Institute Sergiev Posad		
Russia	Koltsovo, Novosibirsk Oblast	State Research Center of Virology and Biotechnology (VECTOR)		One of two WHO-approved facilities for work on smallpox virus.
Singapore	Central Region	DSO National Laboratories	End-2025 (expected)	First BSL-4 lab in Singapore when completed.
South Africa	Johannesburg, Gauteng	National Institute for Communicable Diseases	2002	
South Korea	Cheongju, North Chungcheong Province	Korea Centers for Disease Control and Prevention	2017	First BSL-4 lab in South Korea.
Spain	Tres Cantos, Community of Madrid	GlaxoSmithKline plc	2026	Spain's first BSL-4 laboratory and the first one in the world from a pharmaceutical company.
Sweden	Solna, Stockholm County	Public Health Agency of Sweden	2001	The only BSL-4 facility in the Nordic region. Constructed for research and diagnostics of hemorrhagic fever viruses.
Switzerland	Geneva, Canton of Geneva	University Hospital of Geneva		"Glove box" type laboratory; primarily for handling clinical samples.
Switzerland	Spiez, Canton of Bern	Spiez Laboratory	2013	Run by the Federal Office for Civil Protection of the Federal Department of Defence, Civil Protection and Sports.
Switzerland	Mittelhäusern, Canton of Bern	The Institute of Virology and Immunology IVI		Part of the Food Safety and Veterinary Office (FSVO). Primary purpose is diagnostics of highly pathogenic viruses.
Taiwan	Taipei	National Defense University – Institute of Preventive Medicine	1983	
Taiwan	Taipei	Kwen-yang Laboratory		
United Kingdom	Camden, Greater London	Francis Crick Institute	2015	Has BSL-4 space but does not work on human pathogens.
United Kingdom	Colindale, Greater London	Public Health England's Centre for Infections		Department of Health laboratory. Diagnostics for various viral diseases. Part of the European Network of Biosafety-Level-4 Laboratories.
United Kingdom	Mill Hill, Greater London	National Institute for Medical Research		Medical Research Council laboratory. Research and diagnostics for highly pathogenic viruses. Closed in 2017 and work moved to the Francis Crick Institute. Site demolished in 2018.
United Kingdom	Potters Bar, Hertfordshire	National Institute for Biological Standards and Control		Department of Health and Home Office laboratory. Develop assays and reagents for research on virulent pathogens.
United Kingdom	Addlestone, Surrey	Animal and Plant Health Agency		Department for Environment, Food and Rural Affairs laboratory. Diagnostics and research for animal diseases.
United Kingdom	Pirbright, Surrey	Institute for Animal Health		Biotechnology and Biological Sciences Research Council laboratory. Research on highly pathogenic animal diseases.
United Kingdom	Pirbright, Surrey	Merial Animal Health		Private lab. Produces vaccines against foot and mouth disease and bluetongue disease.
United Kingdom	Porton Down, Wiltshire	UK Health Security Agency		Department of Health laboratory. Diagnostics and research for haemorrhagic fever viruses. Part of the European Network of Biosafety-Level-4 Laboratories.
United Kingdom	Porton Down, Wiltshire	Defence Science and Technology Laboratory		Ministry of Defence laboratory. Focuses on protection from biological weapons.
United States	Atlanta, Georgia	Centers for Disease Control and Prevention		Currently operates in two buildings. One of two facilities in the world that officially hold smallpox.
United States	Atlanta, Georgia	Georgia State University	1997	Research focus on B virus.
United States	Manhattan, Kansas	National Bio and Agro-Defense Facility (NBAF)	2023	Facility is operated by the Department of Homeland Security, and will replace the Plum Island Animal Disease Center. Began operation in 2023.
United States	Bethesda, Maryland	National Institutes of Health (NIH)		Located on the NIH Campus, it currently only operates with BSL-3 agents.
United States	Fort Detrick, Maryland	Integrated Research Facility		Operated by National Institute of Allergy and Infectious Diseases (NIAID). Focuses on animal models of human diseases.
United States	Fort Detrick, Maryland	National Biodefense Analysis and Countermeasures Center		Operated by the Department of Homeland Security. Focus on potential bioterrorism threats.
United States	Fort Detrick, Maryland	US Army Medical Research Institute of Infectious Diseases (USAMRIID)	1969	Run by the United States Army. Research focuses on biological threats to the U.S. military.
United States	Boston, Massachusetts	National Emerging Infectious Diseases Laboratory (NEIDL), Boston University	Built 2008, Opened 2012, BSL-4 Approval in 2017	Focus on potential threats to public health. Operated by Boston University School of Medicine.
United States	Hamilton, Montana	Rocky Mountain Laboratories Integrated Research Facility	2008	NIAID laboratory. Focus on vector-borne diseases.
United States	Galveston, Texas	Galveston National Laboratory, National Biocontainment Facility		Opened in 2008, facility is operated by the University of Texas Medical Branch (UTMB).
United States	Galveston, Texas	Shope Laboratory	2004	Operated by UTMB.
United States	San Antonio, Texas	Texas Biomedical Research Institute	1999	The only privately owned BSL-4 lab in the US.
United States	Richmond, Virginia	Virginia Division of Consolidated Laboratories	2003	A BSL-4 lab that also acts as a BSL-3 lab.

== See also ==
- Aeromedical Isolation Team
- Biocontainment
- Biological hazard
- Biosafety
- Hazmat suit
- Interplanetary contamination
- Laboratory Response Network
- List of laboratory biosecurity incidents
- Safety engineering
- Security engineering
- Select agent
