= Aahl =

Aahl may refer to:

- All American Hockey League (2008–11), professional ice hockey league started in 2008 that was based in the mid-western US
- All-American Hockey League (1987–1988), formerly the Continental Hockey League; in 1988, it merged with the Atlantic Coast Hockey League to form the East Coast Hockey League
- Australian Animal Health Laboratory in Geelong, Victoria
- American Amateur Hockey League, amateur ice hockey league that operated 1896–1918
