= 2025 Canadian ostrich culling controversy =

Legal issue resulting from detection of H5N8

The 2025 Canadian ostrich culling controversy is a legal, political, and social dispute in Canada arising from the conflict between Universal Ostrich Farm in Edgewood, British Columbia, and the Canadian Food Inspection Agency (CFIA) over an order to cull approximately 300 to 330 ostriches following the detection of Influenza A virus subtype H5N1.

The conflict and ensuing cull order prompted protests, multiple legal proceedings, and international attention, including interventions by American political figures and animal welfare organizations. On November 6, 2025, the Supreme Court of Canada rejected the Farm's appeal, and the CFIA completed the culling of the ostriches.

== Background ==
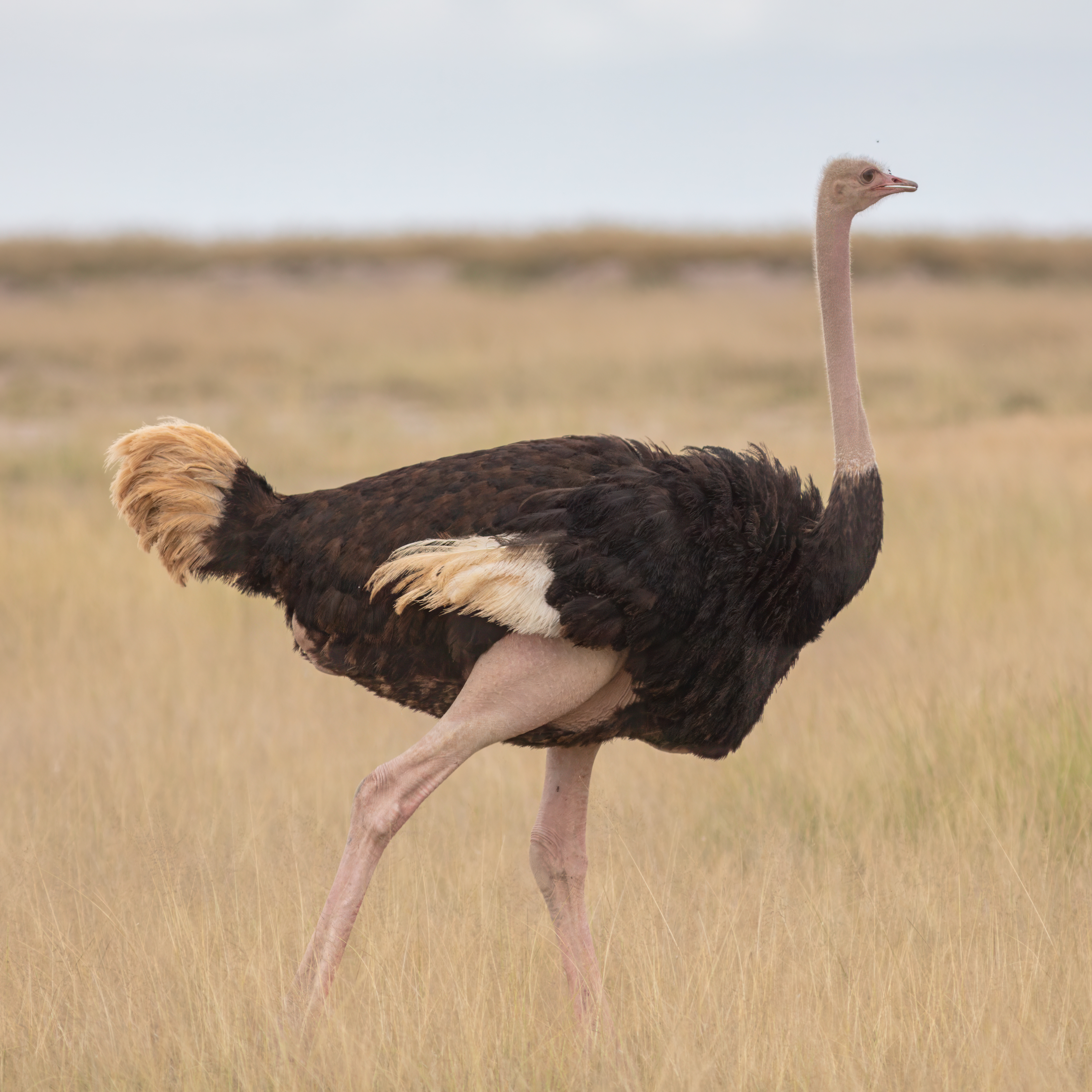
A common ostrich (Struthio camelus).

The Universal Ostrich Farm, located in Edgewood, British Columbia, is operated by owners Dave Bilinski and Karen Espersen and maintained a flock of between 300 and 500 ostriches. The property consists of open-air enclosures with shared facilities and close proximity to surrounding wildlife. No roofed barns segregate ostriches by age group. A large natural pond, routinely visited by wild ducks and other waterfowl, lies near the centre of the property between two outdoor bird pens.

In February 2020, the Farm's ostriches experienced a significant illness, resulting in the deaths of approximately ten birds. Laboratory testing confirmed bacterial infections caused by Proteus spp., Pseudomonas aeruginosa, and Escherichia coli. Although not supported by laboratory findings, the Farm speculated that avian influenza might have contributed to the illness.

In early December 2024, a new outbreak of respiratory symptoms emerged shortly after exposure to wild ducks. The Farm observed respiratory or "flu-like" symptoms among a subset of ostriches, similar to the 2020 outbreak. The Canadian Food Inspection Agency (CFIA) intervened on December 28, 2024, following an anonymous report of 25–30 ostrich deaths at the Farm.

On December 31, 2024, the Canadian Animal Health Surveillance Network laboratory in Abbotsford, British Columbia, reported positive test results for the H5 avian influenza subtype. The National Centre for Foreign Animal Disease confirmed the presence of a highly pathogenic avian influenza (HPAI).

=== CFIA Order ===
On December 31, 2024, the CFIA issued a Notice to Dispose under the Health of Animals Act, requiring the culling of the ostriches, with a deadline of February 1, 2025. Universal Ostrich Farm sought an exemption from the Notice to Dispose, which the CFIA denied on January 10, 2025. By the end of January 2025, deaths associated with flu-like illness reportedly reached 69 birds, representing approximately 15 per cent of the flock of 468.

In issuing the Notice to Dispose, the CFIA cited animal health and economic interest, including the need to protect both public and animal health and to minimize impacts on Canada's $6.8-billion domestic poultry industry and $1.75 billion in annual poultry exports. Following the confirmed presence of highly pathogenic avian influenza (HPAI), British Columbia's poultry industry became subject to export restrictions to several countries, including Mexico, Japan, and Taiwan. Other trading partners, such as China and South Africa, maintain broader import bans on Canadian poultry products due to the ongoing presence of HPAI nationwide.

The Universal Ostrich Farm sought judicial review of the Notice to Dispose, arguing that the surviving ostriches could contribute to scientific research and that less drastic biosecurity measures, such as quarantine, should have been pursued instead of mandatory destruction.

== Legal actions and court interventions ==
On January 31, 2025, the Federal Court issued an injunction staying the CFIA's Notice to Dispose pending determination of the judicial review. On May 13, 2025, Justice Russel W. Zinn of the Federal Court dismissed Universal Ostrich Farm's application for judicial review, finding that the CFIA's decision was reasonable and procedurally fair. On June 20, 2025, the Federal Court of Appeal granted a second stay of the cull order pending appeal of the Federal Court's decision. On August 21, 2025, a unanimous panel of the Federal Court of Appeal composed of Justices Mary J.L. Gleason, René LeBlanc, and Gerald Heckman, dismissed Universal Ostrich Farm's appeal.

On September 24, 2025, Justice Michelle O'Bonsawin of the Supreme Court of Canada issued an interim stay of the CFIA's Notice to Dispose pending the Court's decision on whether to grant leave to appeal. The order was conditional on the ostriches being properly cared for. The CFIA maintained a presence at the farm to mitigate biosecurity risks, including limiting wild bird access to the ostriches and controlling water flow from the quarantine zone to other areas of the property. In its submissions, the CFIA and federal government lawyers argued that the cull order was consistent with Canada's international obligations concerning avian influenza control and that the disease continued to pose a high risk. On November 6, 2025, the Supreme Court of Canada dismissed the application for leave to appeal.

During the judicial review process, individuals associated with the infected premises reported that blood tests had detected H5N1 antibodies in their systems. During the appeals, the farm's owners were arrested for civil disobedience after remaining in an ostrich enclosure despite repeated instructions to vacate.

== Aftermath ==
In the evening of November 6, 2025, following the Supreme Court of Canada's dismissal of the application for leave to appeal, the CFIA proceeded to carry out the cull of the remaining ostriches. The Agency corralled the birds into an enclosed pen and engaged professional marksmen to destroy the flock.

== Protests, social and international response ==
The issue sparked protests at the farm and led to online activity. Supporters targeted local businesses and workers they believed were helping with the cull. The CFIA acknowledged coordinated efforts to disrupt their services by engaging their phone lines with false requests.

The CFIA brought in many large bales of hay when it took control of the ostriches on September 22, 2025. These bales were used to corral the flock. The property is guarded by RCMP officers, as RCMP presence is now required for any CFIA on-farm activities. On September 24, some of they hay bales ignited, leading to a fire that was extinguished by the Edgewood Fire Department. The cause is still being investigated by RCMP.

RCMP provided 24-hour protection for a neighbour to the farm when a suspected protestor assaulted her and was accused of dousing her and her property with gasoline.

=== International ===
The case got attention in the US, where politicians Robert F. Kennedy Jr. and Mehmet Oz offered sanctuary and research money for the ostriches.

== See also ==
- Ostrich farming in North America
- Influenza pandemic
