= National Microbiology Laboratory =

Department of the Public Health Agency of Canada

The National Microbiology Laboratory (NML) is part of the Public Health Agency of Canada (PHAC), the agency of the Government of Canada that is responsible for public health, health emergency preparedness and response, and infectious and chronic disease control and prevention.

NML is located in several sites across the country including the Canadian Science Centre for Human and Animal Health (CSCHAH) in Winnipeg, Manitoba. NML has a second site in Winnipeg, the JC Wilt Infectious Disease Research Centre on Logan Avenue which serves as a hub for HIV research and diagnostics in Canada. The three other primary sites include locations in Guelph, St. Hyacinthe and Lethbridge.

The CSCHAH is a biosafety level 4 infectious disease laboratory facility, the only one of its kind in Canada. With maximum containment, scientists are able to work with pathogens including Ebola, Marburg and Lassa fever.

The NML's CSCHAH is also home to the Canadian Food Inspection Agency's National Centre for Foreign Animal Disease, and thus the scientists at the NML share their premises with animal virologists.

== History ==
The National Microbiology Laboratory was preceded by the Bureau of Microbiology which was originally part of the Laboratory Centre for Disease Control of Health Canada in Ottawa. In the 1980s, Health Canada identified both the need to replace existing laboratory space that was reaching the end of its lifespan and the need for Containment Level 4 space in the country.

Around the same time, Agriculture Canada (prior to the Canadian Food Inspection Agency being formed) also identified the need for new laboratory space including high-containment. Numerous benefits were identified for housing both laboratories in one building and Winnipeg was chosen as the site; an announcement to that effect was made in October 1987.

After some debate, the spot chosen for the site was a city works yard near to the Health Sciences Centre (a major teaching hospital), the University of Manitoba's medical school, and other life science organizations. Construction of the facility that came to be named the Canadian Science Centre for Human and Animal Health (often referred to locally as "the Virology Lab") began with an official ground-breaking in December 1992.

The joint venture design team of Toronto-based Dunlop Architects and Winnipeg-based Smith Carter Architects and Engineers visited 30 laboratories to seek best practices in containment and design. Construction was largely complete by the end of 1997 with the first programs beginning in the spring of 1998 and all laboratories coming on line after that. The official opening took place in June 1999.

Following the SARS outbreak in 2003, the Public Health Agency of Canada was formed in 2004 to provide a stronger focus on public health and emergency preparedness in the country. It is a member of the federal Health Portfolio (along with Health Canada, the Canadian Institute of Health Research, and other organizations).

By 2018 the NML was beginning to use genomics and advanced computing to study microbes at the genetic level in so-called "dry lab" facilities, as opposed to "wet labs" with Petri dishes and cell cultures.

The NML (PHAC) fired Chinese nationals Xiangguo Qiu and her husband Keding Cheng from their jobs as BSL4 infectious disease researchers in January 2021; previously in July 2019 the pair had been dismissed from their positions as unpaid members of the University of Winnipeg for their agency in a mysterious trans-Pacific shipment of BSL4-grade virus materials back to their homeland when the RCMP was called in.

== Containment ==
Human pathogens are classified into risk groups. The criteria to determine the group includes the level of risk to the health of a person or to public health, as well as the likelihood that the human pathogen will actually cause disease in a human, and whether treatment and preventative measures are available. It can depend on the type of work being done as to which level of containment is needed for pathogens from specific risk groups; as an example, culturing (or growing) a virus or bacterium requires higher containment than some diagnostic tests.

NML operates Containment Level 2, 3 and 4 laboratories. In human health infectious disease laboratories, the design and construction of the facility, the engineering controls, and the training and techniques of staff are all focused on protecting lab workers, containing the pathogens, and preventing contamination of materials to ensure accurate diagnosis and research. All of these factors vary depending on the level of containment.

The vast majority (87.7%) of NML's lab space is Containment Level 2 (CL2). This is the same type of laboratory found in doctors' offices, hospitals and universities. In a Level 2 lab, work with infectious materials is done inside a biosafety cabinet (BSC) and appropriate personal protective gear is worn relative to activities (gloves, eye protection, lab coats, gowns, etc.).

Risk Group 2 pathogens worked with in Level 2 can cause disease but are not a serious hazard and they are often circulating in the community. Environmental contamination must be minimized by the use of hand washing sinks and decontamination facilities such as autoclaves. Examples include E-coli; whooping cough; and seasonal influenza.

NML also has Containment Level 3 (CL3) laboratories (8.6% of lab space). Risk Group 3 pathogens may be transmitted by the airborne route, often need only a low infectious dose to produce effects, and can cause serious or life-threatening disease. CL3 emphasizes additional primary and secondary barriers to minimize the release of infectious organisms into the immediate laboratory and the environment. Additional features to prevent transmission of CL3 organisms are appropriate respiratory protection, HEPA filtration of exhausted laboratory air, and strictly controlled laboratory access. Examples include tuberculosis; West Nile virus; and pandemic H1N1 influenza.

A small percentage of laboratory space (3.6%) is devoted to Containment Level 4 (CL4) at NML. These agents have the potential for aerosol transmission, often have a low infectious dose and produce very serious and often fatal disease; there is no licensed treatment or vaccine available. This level of containment represents an isolated unit independent of other areas. CL4 emphasizes maximum containment of the infectious agent by completely sealing the facility perimeter with confirmation by negative pressure testing, isolation of the researcher from the pathogen by an enclosed positive pressure suit, and decontamination of air and all other materials. Examples include Ebola, Nipah, Marburg, and 1918 pandemic influenza.

== Structure ==
NML programs are housed in several facilities across the country. Two of these facilities are in proximity to each other in Winnipeg: The Canadian Science Centre for Human and Animal Health on Arlington Street and the J.C. Wilt Infectious Diseases Research Centre on Logan Avenue. The other facilities are located in Guelph, ON; St. Hyacinthe, QC and Lethbridge, AB.

NML is divided into five main laboratory divisions which are supported by scientific and administrative services. The primary NML divisions are:

Bacterial Pathogens - focussing on bacterial diseases such as tuberculosis and antibiotic resistant organisms.

Enteric Diseases - focussing on food and water-borne pathogens including E.coli and Salmonella.

Viral Diseases - addressing a range of viral diseases, including hepatitis and other blood-borne pathogens, respiratory viruses and viral exanthemata, such as measles.

Zoonotic Diseases and Special Pathogens - dealing with viral, bacterial and rickettsial zoonoses (diseases transmitted to humans from other species), such as West Nile Virus and Lyme disease, along with risk group 4 agents such as Ebola, Marburg and Lassa fever viruses.

HIV and Retrovirology - providing laboratory services and scientific expertise relating to HIV and emerging retroviruses.

The Science Technology Core and Services Division works with these divisions to provide technological approaches, including genomics, proteomics and bioinformatics.

There is also the Public Health Risk Sciences Division, which is a specialized resource that provides scientific knowledge and solutions to better assess public health risks and enable decisions, with specific attention to infectious disease threats transmitted from food, the animals, or the physical environment.

These science-based divisions are complemented and supported by numerous other units that ensure their ongoing operations such as the Office of Science Planning, Program Support and Services, Scientific Informatic Services, Science Support and Client Services, Surveillance and References Services, the Facility and Property Management Division, and the Biorisk and Occupational Safety Services Division. NML also funds the National Reference Centre for Parasitology in Montreal and has a Laboratory Liaison Technical Officer in most provincial labs.

== Workforce ==
NML employs scientists (MD, PhD, and DVM), biologists, and laboratory technologists, but it also includes informatics specialists, biosafety experts, specialized operations and maintenance staff, and administrative staff, among others. In total, there are approximately 600 staff members as of 2016.

The laboratory has collaborated with scientists from the People's Liberation Army from at least 2016 to 2020.

== Accomplishments ==
NML is renowned for its work on a broad spectrum of infectious diseases from seasonal influenza to Ebola and its accomplishments are too many to detail.

Some recent examples of the work done by NML include their involvement in the response to the West African Ebola outbreak. For a period of about 18 months, teams from NML travelled to West Africa to aid in the diagnostics during the outbreak. They worked closely with the World Health Organization and Médecins sans frontières to ensure people were properly diagnosed so that they could be properly cared for and isolated from others to stop the spread. Also during this outbreak, a promising vaccine and treatment for Ebola that were developed at NML, in conjunction with collaborators, were fast tracked into clinical trials so that they could get to the people that needed it as soon as possible.

Another accomplishment was the response to the 2009 H1N1 influenza pandemic. In April 2009, the Mexican national lab approached NML for assistance with identifying a respiratory virus that was causing outbreaks in Mexico. NML was able to quickly identify the new virus and recognize that it matched the virus that was beginning to circulate in the U.S. As the lead laboratory in Canada, NML rapidly developed diagnostic tests and equipped provincial labs to be able to test for the new virus. NML also assisted Mexico by providing additional testing and sent staff to their national laboratory to enable to help them set up their own testing protocols.

In the international laboratory sector, NML has developed different types of mobile labs: a lab-truck, a lab-trailer, and a "lab in a suitcase". The lab-truck is generally used for in-country deployments at high-profile events such as the 2010 Olympics, the lab-trailer is used for international large-scale events where there may be a threat of bioterrorism or other deliberate acts involving infectious agents, and the lab in a suitcase is frequently used in remote areas of the world with little available infrastructure. An example would be the multiple deployments over the years to combat outbreaks of Ebola in Africa. This model was adopted by many other countries during the 2014-2015 Ebola outbreak in West Africa.

NML houses the secretariats for both the Canadian Public Health Laboratory Network (CPHLN) and the Global Health Security Action Group – Laboratory Network (GHSAG-LN). The role of CPHLN is to provide a forum for public health laboratory leaders to share knowledge. The GHSAG-LN network's goals are to coordinate the diagnostic capabilities of all participants and contribute to disease surveillance around the world.

The Canadian Network for Public Health Intelligence (CNPHI) is an innovation developed by NML staff. It is a secure web-based system that compiles information from various surveillance systems and issues alerts to users. More than 4,000 public health officials across Canada now subscribe to it. CNPHI tools assist in determining the existence or extent of an outbreak through the recognition of related cases across jurisdictions.

== Directors ==
From 2000 to 2014, Dr. Frank Plummer was the Scientific Director General of the National Microbiology Laboratory. Under Dr. Plummer's guidance, the NML developed into one of the world's premier institutions in the research, detection, and response to global infectious disease and bio-security threats.

Dr. Plummer received his medical degree from the University of Manitoba in 1976. Between 1984 and 2001, Dr. Plummer lived in Nairobi, Kenya where he spearheaded the development of the world renowned "Kenya AIDS Control Program," established by the Universities of Manitoba and Nairobi. This HIV epidemiological work was central to global understanding of the risk factors for HIV transmission and how to prevent its spread. Dr. Plummer was the first to reveal that heterosexual women could also be infected with HIV/AIDS and that a cohort of Nairobi sex workers had a natural immunity to HIV/AIDS. This latter discovery suggested the possibility that a vaccine could eventually be developed.

Dr. Plummer stepped down as the NML's Scientific Director General to take the position as senior adviser to the Agency's Chief Public Health Officer in 2014. He remained as a distinguished professor at the University of Manitoba prior to his death in February 2020.

In 2015, Dr. Matthew Gilmour became the Scientific Director General of the National Microbiology Laboratory and the Laboratory for Foodborne Zoonoses. Dr. Gilmour spearheaded the partnership that brought these two laboratories together under the National Microbiology Laboratory umbrella. He was previously the Chief, Enteric Diseases and subsequently the Program Director, Bacteriology and Enteric Diseases at the NML.

Dr. Gilmour has won a number of scientific awards including Canadian Society of Microbiologists' Canadian Graduate Student Microbiologist of the Year Award; the Public Health Agency of Canada's Most Promising Researcher Merit Award and Dr. Andrés Petrasovits Public Health Merit Award; and Health Canada's Excellence Award in Collaborative Leadership and Award for Excellence in Science. Dr. Gilmour continues to be an assistant professor at the University of Manitoba's Department of Medical Microbiology and Infectious Diseases as well as the Secretary Treasurer of the Canadian Association for Clinical Microbiology and Infectious Diseases (CACMID).

== See also ==
- VSV-EBOV
- ZMapp
