= Virginia BioTechnology Research Park =

Coordinates: 37.5443°N 77.4312°W

VA Bio+Tech Park
- Founded: 1992
- Headquarters: Richmond, Virginia
- Website: activation.capital/spaces/biotech-park/

The VA Bio+Tech Park is a 34 acres (14 ha) commercial life sciences hub in downtown Richmond, Virginia adjacent to the VCU Medical Center at Virginia Commonwealth University. The park was incorporated in 1992 and opened in 1995. It houses nearly 70 public and private life sciences companies, research institutes affiliated with VCU, and prominent state and national medical laboratories. Residents include the national headquarters for the Virginia Division of Consolidated Lab Services, United Network for Organ Sharing (UNOS), and True Health Diagnostics. The park was formerly the home of the Virginia Department of Forensic Science and the Virginia Office of the Chief Medical Examiner before they relocated in early 2026. The park's largest tenant is Richmond-based Altria Group, Inc., which opened the metal-clad, 450,000-square-foot, $350 million Center for Research & Technology on the site in 2007. The heavily secured complex employs 600 scientists, engineers and support staff.

From 1995 to 2011, the park generated approximately $108 million in tax revenue for the Commonwealth, according to the Virginia Economic Development Partnership. The added economic impact attributable to the park since founding is $3.8 billion. The park's business incubation program has graduated more than 40 client companies including three publicly traded firms, and those client companies and graduates have attracted more than $400 million in equity, grant, and strategic capital.

Companies and organizations in the Bio+Tech Park are housed in nine buildings that make up roughly 1.5 million square feet of space and employ more than 2,000 people. The VA Bio+Tech Park's Executive Director & President/CEO is Chandra Briggman.

Unlike states such as North Carolina and Maryland that fund their research parks, the Virginia site does not receive direct money from the Commonwealth, City of Richmond, or VCU. The Park is funded mostly by parking and leasing fees.
