= Canadian Science Centre for Human and Animal Health =

General information
- Location: 1015 Arlington Street, Winnipeg, MB R3E 3M4, Canada
- Coordinates: 49.9101°N 97.1632°W
- Current tenants: National Microbiology Laboratory; National Centre for Foreign Animal Disease
- Construction started: 1992
- Construction stopped: 1997
- Renovated: 2009, 2017
- Renovation cost: $16.5 m CAD
- Owner: Government of Canada

Technical details
- Floor area: 315,000 sq ft (29,300 m^{2})
- Grounds: 15 acres (61,000 m^{2})

Design and construction
- Architect: Jim Orzechowski
- Architecture firm: Smith Carter Architects and Engineers

Renovating team
- Renovating firm: Smith Carter Architects and Engineers
- Main contractor: PCL Constructors
- Canadian Science Centre for Human and Animal Health

Agency overview
- Minister responsible: Mark Holland, Minister of Health
- Parent department: Public Health Agency of Canada

The Canadian Science Centre for Human and Animal Health (CSCHAH) is an infectious disease laboratory complex in Winnipeg, Manitoba, owned and operated by the Government of Canada. This modern facility is home to two laboratories: the Public Health Agency of Canada's National Microbiology Laboratory (NML) and the Canadian Food Inspection Agency's National Centre for Foreign Animal Disease (NCFAD). It was the workplace of approximately 550 federal employees prior to the COVID-19 outbreak; since then it has been home to over 800 staff.

While most of the laboratory space is dedicated to Containment Level 2 (also known as Biosafety Level 2) and Containment Level 3 laboratories, CSCHAH is the only facility in Canada operating Containment Level 4 (CL4) laboratories and is the first facility in the world to have both human and animal Level 4 laboratories under one roof.

Both NML and NCFAD operate critical diagnostic testing programs relied on across the country. These programs protect human health, animal health, and international trade.

== History ==
In the 1980s, both Agriculture Canada (prior to the Canadian Food Inspection Agency being formed) and Health Canada identified the need to replace existing laboratory space that was reaching the end of its lifespan as well as the need for Containment Level 4 space in the country. Numerous benefits were identified for housing both laboratories in one building, including cost savings. Winnipeg was chosen as the site and an announcement was made in October 1987.

After some debate, the spot chosen for the site was a city works yard near to the Health Sciences Centre (a major teaching hospital) and the University of Manitoba's medical school. The City of Winnipeg transferred the title for $1. Construction of the facility that came to be named the Canadian Science Centre for Human and Animal Health (often referred to locally as "the Virology Lab") began with an official groundbreaking in December 1992. The design team, headed by the Winnipeg-based Smith Carter Architects and Engineers Inc., visited laboratories around the world to seek best practices in containment and design. Construction finished toward the end of 1997, with the first programs beginning in the spring of 1998 following an extensive commissioning process. The rest of the laboratories then became operational one by one. The official opening took place in 1999.

Since then, the laboratories in the facility have been instrumental in responding to a number of significant infectious disease outbreaks: The 2003 SARS outbreak when NML led the laboratory response; the 2003 BSE case when NCFAD provided the diagnosis of the initial case and then undertook testing as part of a vast investigation; the 2004 avian influenza outbreak in BC for which NCFAD led the laboratory investigation.

In 2007 the introduction to a journal supplement remembering its designers claimed that the CSCHAH "has become the prototype for modern BSL4 laboratories".

In 2009, Mexico sought help from NML in identifying the unknown respiratory pathogen which was to become known as the pandemic H1N1 influenza.

NML's involvement in the response to the West African Ebola outbreak. For a period of about 18 months, teams from NML travelled to West Africa to aid in the diagnostics during the outbreak. Their ongoing work on developing both a vaccine and treatment was fast-tracked into clinical trials during this period to help stop the outbreak.

== Co-location ==
The primary reason for housing the two laboratories in the same complex was economic. It saves the citizens of Canada money by only having one facility to operate with a number of shared services also keeping costs down. However, the partnership between these two labs also allows for collaboration and cooperation on established, emerging and re-emerging infectious diseases. Many of the viruses, bacteria and prions studied at CSCHAH are zoonotic, meaning that they can transfer from animals to humans.

== Facility ==
CSCHAH is a 332,766 square foot complex. The complex is built as a series of program-specific blocks interconnected by an area dedicated to common elements for both departments such as the library, cafeteria, and theatre.

CSCHAH houses laboratories to manage any type of infectious organism from the most common to the most exotic. Containment Level 2 (CL2) laboratories are the same as what can be found at a hospital or doctor's office; 60.8% of CSCHAH lab space is dedicated to level 2. Containment Level 3 involves specific engineering controls and protocols to ensure the safety of lab staff, the public and the environment; 35.5% of CSCHAH lab space is CL3 space, the majority of which is dedicated to animal pathogens. Although the facility is thought of as a "Level 4 facility," only 3.7% of lab space is used for CL4. Level 4, with its special construction and biosafety suits, is necessary to work with the most serious of pathogens including Ebola, Nipah, and Marburg.

Following the SARS outbreak in 2003, lessons learned resulted in a number of changes to public health in Canada. Among those were the creation of the Public Health Agency of Canada, and the construction of a high-tech operations centre at CSCHAH. This operations centre is the hub of the National Microbiology Laboratory when there is an outbreak or a deployment of personnel off-site. It is equipped with three separate phone systems, can videoconference with 38 participants at a time, and can connect via satellite to remote locations around the world. Virtually all staff at NML are trained in the Incident Command System and are able to jump into action at a moment's notice if there is a public health event of some type.

A three-story expansion to the building was completed in 2011. The expanded and renovated areas include specimen receiving, shipping and receiving, bio-repository, media preparation, office, and meeting space.

== Safety ==
Any material exiting the level 3 or 4 laboratories must be sterilized or decontaminated in some manner. Air is drawn into the laboratories through the use of negative air pressure before being filtered out through High Efficiency Particulate Air (HEPA) filters. Laboratory waste such as gloves, test tubes, and pipette tips are removed via an autoclave, a piece of equipment that sterilizes materials with steam and pressure. Any liquids leaving the high-containment space go through a biowaste system that operates like a large autoclave to sterilize it. The high-containment labs are built as a box-in-a-box; they do not border exterior walls and there are mechanical spaces above and below them.

== Security ==
CSCHAH is a high-security facility. Security staff work closely with local police, RCMP and CSIS to ensure an appropriate level of security at all times. Only the lobby area is open to the public; all guests must be escorted within the secure area at all times. All staff working in the facility have Secret Level II security clearance.

== Community Liaison Committee ==
The Community Liaison Committee to the Canadian Science Centre for Human and Animal Health was struck by the ministers of Health and Agriculture in 1999. The committee's first meeting took place in January 2000.

The committee consists of volunteer members representing a wide range of organizations including community residents, scientists, health care professionals, and agricultural professionals. The committee meets at least four times per year, holds regular public information sessions and issues reports on their activities. Other laboratories have been modelled on this approach.

At the committee's request, CSCHAH developed reporting guidelines to determine the extent of communication around any incidents that may take place at the centre. This ensures that the committee and others are apprised of incidents of any significance in a timely manner plus they have access to information on each and every incident no matter how minor, at their meetings.

== Components ==
- National Centre for Foreign Animal Disease (Canadian Food Inspection Agency)
- National Microbiology Laboratory (Public Health Agency of Canada)

== See also ==
- PolyAnalytik
