= William S. Harris =

American professor

Bill Harris PhD, FAHA
- Born: William S. Harris
- Education: University of Minnesota
- Occupation: Human Nutrition Researcher
- Known for: Omega-3 Fatty Acid research
- Website: Profile on OmegaQuant.com

William S. Harris, (also known as Bill Harris) PhD FAHA FASN is an American professor and researcher focusing on human nutrition. His work has focused on the role of omega-3 fatty acids as they relate to cardiovascular disease and neuropsychiatric disease.

== Education and academic career ==
A 1971 graduate of Hanover College where he majored in chemistry, Harris completed a PhD in Nutrition and Food Science from the University of Minnesota in 1978. He was a Professor of Medicine at the University of Missouri-Kansas City, where he was the Daniel J. Lauer/Missouri Chair in Lipid Metabolism until 2006. He co-directed the Lipid and Diabetes Research Center at the Mid America Heart Institute of Saint Luke's Hospital of Kansas City. In 2006, he joined faculty at the University of South Dakota Sanford School of Medicine, where he directed the Cardiovascular Health Research Center at the Sanford Research Center.

== Industry career ==
Harris founded OmegaQuant in 2009 to develop the RBC omega-3 index as a research assay. This assay was later acquired by the Health Diagnostic Laboratory.

== Research ==
His work focused on the role of lipid and lipoprotein metabolism in human disease, specifically, the development of an RBC omega-3 index. In 2009, he chaired an American Heart Association science advisory on Omega-6 fatty acids and cardiovascular disease. He has authored over 300 manuscripts in peer-reviewed literature.

== Honors and awards ==
Harris is a Fellow of the American Heart Association and a Fellow of the American Society for Nutrition.
