= Residue (chemistry) =

Whatever remains following a given physical or chemical process

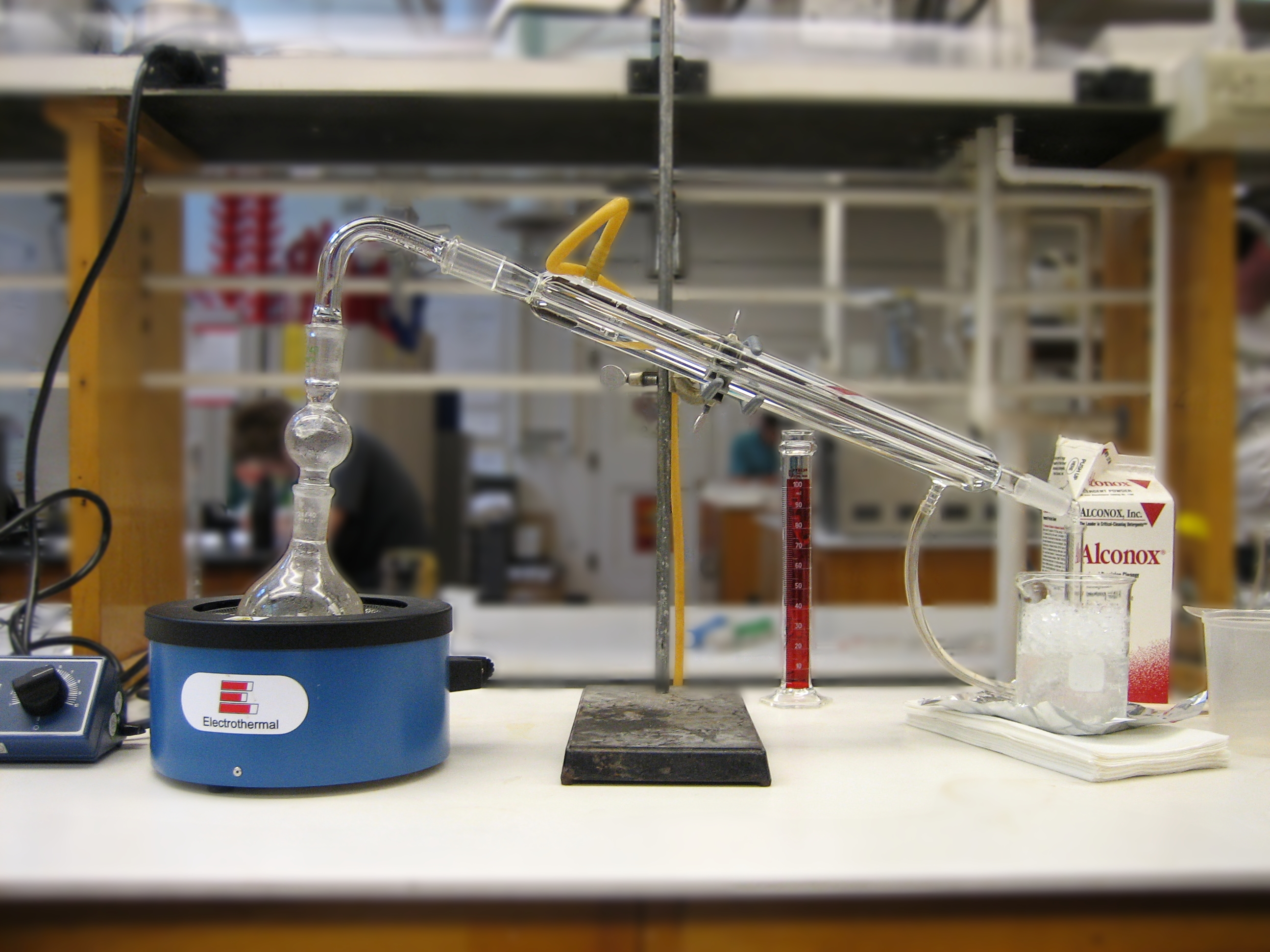
Distillation apparatus

In chemistry, residue has different meanings. The more common meanings are: the remains or contaminant after a chemical process of preparation, separation, or purification (e.g., distillation, evaporation, or filtration; it may also denote the undesired by-products of a chemical reaction, which are a concern, for example, in agricultural and food industries. Other meanings include functional groups, and the monomers that make up a polymer.

== Food safety ==
Toxic chemical residues, wastes, or contamination from other processes, are a concern in food safety. The most common food residues originate from pesticides, veterinary drugs, and industrial chemicals. For example, the U.S. Food and Drug Administration (FDA) and the Canadian Food Inspection Agency (CFIA) have guidelines for detecting chemical residues that are possibly dangerous to consume. In the U.S., the FDA is responsible for setting guidelines while other organizations enforce them.

== Environmental concerns ==
Residue also refers to chemical contaminants in the environment from mining processing, fuel leaks during industrial transportation, and industrial agriculture. Contamination could lead to excess pesticides in the soil or trace amounts of radioactive material in the environment.

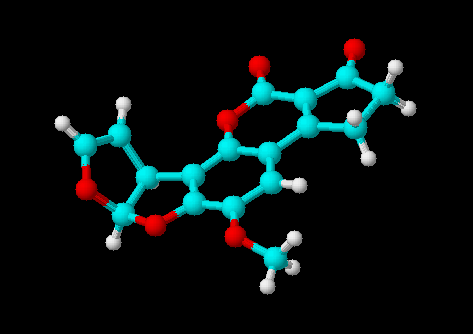
3D image of Aflatoxin

== Chemistry ==
Residue is an atom or a group of atoms that form part of a molecule (such as a methyl group).

== Biochemistry ==
In biochemistry and molecular biology, the term residue refers to a specific monomer within the polymeric chain of a polysaccharide, protein or nucleic acid. A residue's properties will influence interactions with other residues and the overall chemical properties of the protein it resides in.

=== Example ===
In proteins, the carboxyl group of one amino acid links with the amino group of another amino acid to form a peptide. This results in the removal of water, and what remains is called the residue.

A DNA or RNA residue is a single nucleotide in a nucleic acid. Examples of residues in DNA are the bases "A", "T", "G", and "C".

=== Nomenclature ===
In naming residues, the word acid is replaced with residue. such as using words like "amino acids residue" or "histidine residue". Note that the appellation residue is different from a moiety, which describes larger and characteristic parts of organic molecules.
