= Virginia Division of Consolidated Laboratory Services =

Public health agency in Virginia, US

- Seal of Virginia
- Established: 1972 (established); 2003 (current facility)
- Laboratory type: BSL-4, BSL-3+
- Director: Denise Toney, PhD
- Staff: 230
- Location: Richmond, Virginia, U.S.
- Campus: Virginia BioTechnology Research Park; 194,500 square feet
- Nickname: VDCL
- Operating agency: Virginia Department of General Services
- Website: dgs.virginia.gov/division-of-consolidated-laboratory-services

Virginia Division of Consolidated Laboratory Services (DCLS) is the public health laboratory for the U.S. state of Virginia. DCLS consolidates all of the state's laboratory functions, with environmental, clinical, agricultural and consumer protection missions all integrated under one roof and one director. DCLS provides testing services for around 50 state and federal agencies including the FBI, EPA, Virginia State Police, and Virginia Department of Health. It is located within the Virginia BioTechnology Research Park in Richmond, near Virginia Commonwealth University and directly adjacent to VCU Medical Center.

At DCLS, Virginia maintains a biosafety level 4 (BSL-4) containment laboratory, certified to handle the world's most dangerous select agents, one of only 12 such facilities in the United States.

== Laboratory services ==
=== Environmental protection ===
DCLS conducts environmental testing to safeguard public health. In 2014, the agency established the Virginia Biomonitoring Program to increase the commonwealth's capacity to assess environmental exposures in Virginians.

=== Clinical testing ===
The lab's highest volume service is newborn screening, performed on all infants born within the state, which Virginia has opted to require by law. Other high-volume work includes sexually transmitted disease (STD) testing.

=== Agricultural biosecurity ===
The lab tests animals, animal milk and animal feeds; water, soil and air; fertilizers and commercial foodstuffs

=== Regulatory and consumer protection functions ===
The lab tests drinking water for about 300 water systems across the state, as well as a range of consumer commodities. It also analyzes motor fuels to verify octane ratings and other quality parameters.

=== Biodefense and law enforcement ===
DCLS supports Virginia law enforcement and federal agencies. It is able to test industrial and weapons-grade chemicals and biological agents. The lab also examines human specimens for evidence of outbreaks and emerging infectious diseases such as SARS, West Nile virus, or Monkeypox.

== BSL-4 laboratory ==
In 2003, the Virginia DCLS opened a biosafety level 4 lab designated for research and testing involving hazardous microorganisms of the highest biocontainment level, such as Bacillus anthracis. The case for the lab's creation was driven by George Foresman, a Virginia homeland security official who pushed then-Governor Mark Warner to build the BSL-4 lab following the 2001 anthrax attacks, during which the DCLS facility tested more than 1,000 cases. Foresman said the anthrax attacks showed the importance of having a well-equipped and secure lab in Virginia as backup in a national or regional health emergency.

The BSL-4 lab is a 30-foot long glovebox-type class III biosafety cabinet housed within the facility's BSL-3 lab. It is sealed by specialized ventilation and waste-management systems. Lab workers within the BSL-4 containment unit operate in pairs, wearing extensive personal protective equipment, and are limited to working periods of no more than four hours at a time.

== History ==
DCLS was formed in 1972 from the consolidation of several Virginia agencies responsible for laboratory testing. It is part of the Virginia Department of General Services.

The $63 million, 194,5000 square-foot facility also contains a BSL-3 lab and training space and is located adjacent to Virginia Commonwealth University.

The agency is currently led by Dr. Denise Toney.
