= Těchonín =

- Municipality
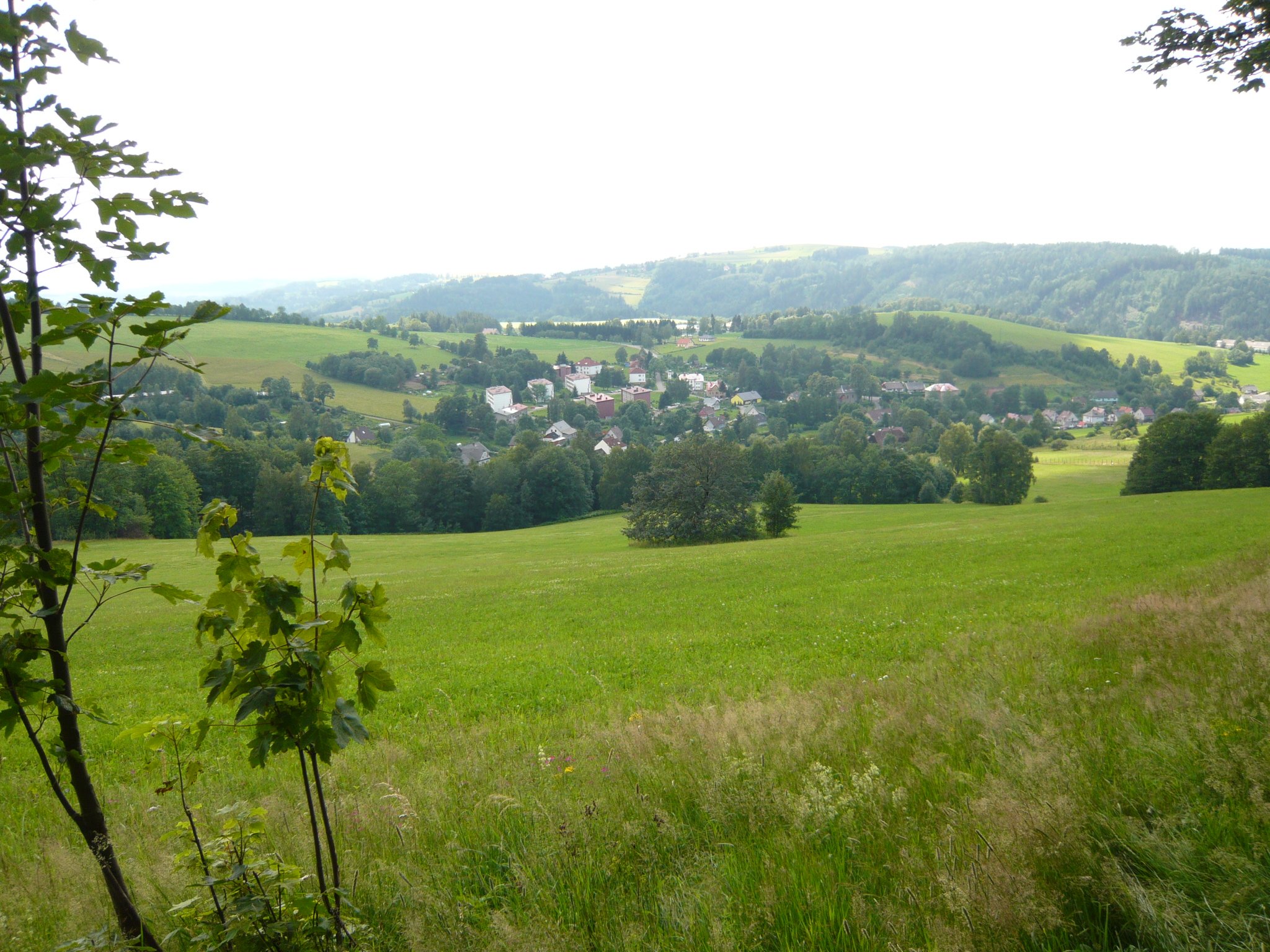
- General view

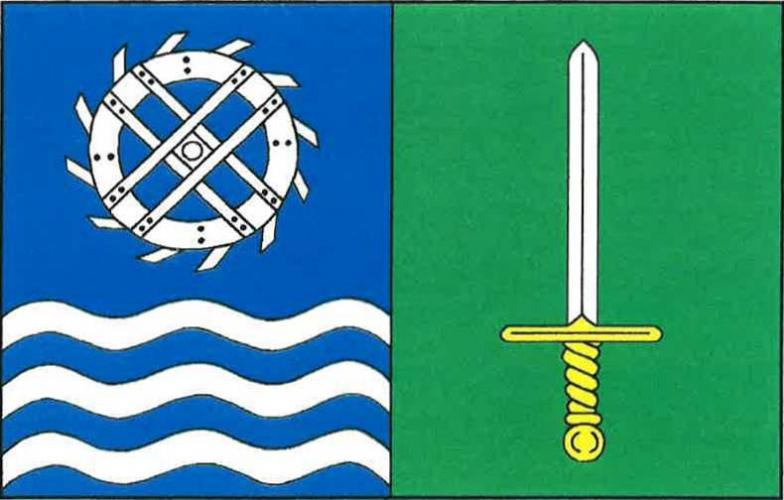
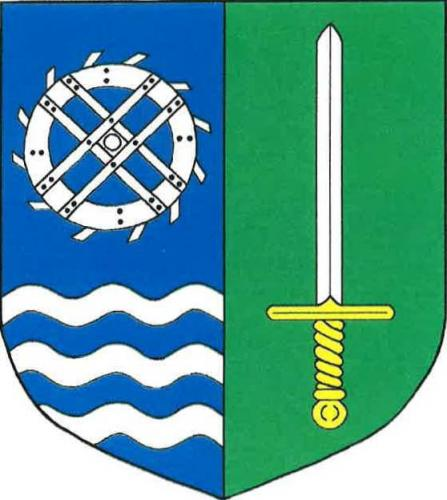
- Flag Coat of arms

- Location in the Czech Republic
- Coordinates: 50°3′54″N 16°37′5″E
- Country: Czech Republic
- Region: Pardubice
- District: Ústí nad Orlicí
- First mentioned: 1543

Area
  - Total: 18.99 km^{2} (7.33 sq mi)
- Elevation: 494 m (1,621 ft)

Population (2026-01-01)
  - Total: 604
  - Density: 31.8/km^{2} (82.4/sq mi)
- Time zone: UTC+1 (CET)
  - Summer (DST): UTC+2 (CEST)
- Postal code: 561 66
- Website: www.techonin.cz

Těchonín (German: Linsdorf) is a municipality and village in Ústí nad Orlicí District in the Pardubice Region of the Czech Republic. It has about 600 inhabitants.

== Administrative division ==
Těchonín consists of three municipal parts (in brackets population according to the 2021 census):

- Těchonín (460)
- Celné (111)
- Stanovník (12)

== Demographics ==
Historical population
Year	Pop.	±%
1869	1,850	—
1880	1,949	+5.4%
1890	1,908	−2.1%
1900	1,522	−20.2%
1910	1,476	−3.0%
1921	1,274	−13.7%
1930	1,267	−0.5%
1950	1,175	−7.3%
1961	1,003	−14.6%
1970	757	−24.5%
1980	836	+10.4%
1991	702	−16.0%
2001	646	−8.0%
2011	582	−9.9%
2021	583	+0.2%
Source: Censuses

== Economy ==
A BSL-4 biosafety facility, Centre of Biological Protection, is located here.
