= Harbin Veterinary Research Institute =

Chinese research institute

Harbin Veterinary Research Institute (HVRI) is a Chinese biological research institute located in Harbin, China. It is under the supervision of the Chinese Academy of Agricultural Sciences (CAAS).

HVRI was created in 1948 and is the first veterinary medicine research institute in China.

In 2013 the HVRI has come to the public attention due to the controversies surrounding its research on H5N1 and H1N1 viruses.

In 2018, the Institute put the country's second biosafety level-4 (BSL-4) lab, and the first for large animals, into operation.
