= National Centre for Foreign Animal Disease =

Canadian research laboratory

The National Centre for Foreign Animal Disease (NCFAD), located in the Canadian Science Centre for Human and Animal Health in Winnipeg, Manitoba, is part of the Canadian Food Inspection Agency’s National Centres for Animal Disease. NCFAD is co-located with the Public Health Agency of Canada’s National Microbiology Laboratory.

NCFAD provides scientific expertise and technologies for the prevention, detection, control and reporting of foreign animal diseases (FAD) and emerging animal diseases. The lab has diagnostic capabilities for a large number of FADs including, but not limited to: avian influenza, foot-and-mouth disease, classical swine fever, and Nipah and Hendra virus infections.

The NCFAD has received designations by the World Organisation for Animal Health (OIE)e as a reference laboratory for both highly pathogenic avian influenza and for classical swine fever, in recognition of excellence in diagnostic competency, test method development, validation, research, collaboration and training.

== Mandate and Role ==
The mandate of the NCFAD is to provide scientific and laboratory services for the rapid and accurate identification and reporting of foreign animal diseases. The lab has five main functions: Testing services; technology development and research; training; scientific advice; and international consultation.

NCFAD staff are experts in tests to detect FAD agents, and they perform many of these tests on a routine basis to meet requirements for import, export, and domestic disease control - including surveillance, the provision of confirmatory testing of suspect material, and reference laboratory services. NCFAD scientists also undertake research to develop better testing technologies for FADs. Staff also serve on international committees; maintain international linkages and collaborations with FAD experts in other countries; and provide training to veterinarians, graduate students, and technologists.

One of the methods for providing this training is through a specialized annual course that focuses on FAD recognition, diagnosis and pathogenesis (the origins and development of disease and the mechanisms that cause disease). It is the only facility in Canada that is equipped to present this course. Participants include CFIA field veterinarians, veterinary pathologists from Canada’s teaching colleges, and veterinary diagnosticians from provincial laboratories.

== Structure ==
NCFAD is organized into several Sections and Units:

Classical Swine Fever/Avian Influenza – This Section provides diagnostic testing services, technology development, research, training, and scientific consultation services. Diseases of primary concern are: classical swine fever, African swine fever, Newcastle disease, and notifiable avian influenza. This Section has expertise in the detection, isolation, identification, sequencing and characterization of viruses using conventional and molecular techniques. In addition to OIE Reference Laboratory status for classical swine fever and avian influenza, this Section is also the National Reference Laboratory and as such aides coordination of the network of provincial/university diagnostic animal health laboratories across Canada.

Vesicular Diseases – This Section provides testing services, technology development and research, training, and scientific consultation services for vesicular diseases such as foot-and-mouth disease, swine vesicular disease and vesicular stomatitis. This Section is also involved in the study of host responses, disease transmission and pathogenesis of vesicular diseases. Both in vivo and in vitro work is carried out under strict containment conditions.

Serology/Immunology – This Section conducts both scheduled and special tests for the detection of antibodies to foreign animal disease agents in addition to assay development, validation, training and scientific consultation services. The bulk of scheduled tests (avian influenza, Newcastle disease, bluetongue, pseudorabies, vesicular stomatitis and epizootic hemorrhagic disease) involve the use of validated test methods on traditional farm animal species and the qualification of these animals or their products for movement into, out of, or within Canada and in support of national sero-surveys required by Canada’s trading partners and the OIE to maintain the country’s disease-free status. The Section provides this service for NCFAD as well as for the Canadian Animal Health Surveillance Network (CAHSN).

Zoonotics/Emerging Diseases (Special Pathogens) – This is the Containment Level 4 (CL4) Section of NCFAD. CL4 is where scientists can work safely with the most serious viruses. The Section provides expertise in the area of special pathogens, particularly the CL4 agents and zoonotic containment level 3 agents of veterinary importance such as Nipah virus, Hendra virus, Ebola virus and Rift Valley fever virus. The Section maintains a state of readiness for emergencies or outbreak situations through research, technical development, training and scientific consultation. Protected by positive pressure suits, bench work with infectious agents is conducted in a highly specialized CFIA containment level 4 laboratory. Attached directly to this laboratory is a containment cubicle that allows work with large animals under the CL4 conditions. The staff members receive extensive training prior to work in CL4 and CL3 zoonotic.

Reagent Development - The Reagent Development Section has expertise in the characterization and production of reagents used in diagnostic testing and research to ensure efficient and reliable supply of high quality reagents and cells for use in diagnostic testing and research. The mandate for the reagent development unit is to provide three core services to NCFAD. These services involve the production and characterization of: 1) monoclonal antibodies 2) recombinant proteins and 3) mammalian, avian and insect cells. Each of the services is provided by research and technical staff who specialize in up-to-date technologies relating to the efficient productions of quality reagents.

Pathology – The Pathology Section at the NCFAD delivers diagnostic services by conducting histopathological, electron microscopical and immunohistochemical tests for the diagnosis of a broad range of infectious animal diseases foreign to Canada. The unit also investigates the pathogenesis of foreign animal and emerging diseases, for example: avian influenza, Nipah virus infection, Rift Valley fever, capripox, lumpy skin disease, glanders, and classical swine fever.

Animal Care – The Animal Care Unit collaborates in diagnostic and research activities involving the use of animals. This unit is involved in assays for the determination of pathogenicity indices for avian viruses, the production of serum standards for diagnostic test methods, and research projects on disease pathogenesis. NCFAD primarily works with farm animals such as pigs, chickens and cattle in order to carry out its mandate. The Animal Care Unit consists of a veterinarian and laboratory animal technologists. This unit is devoted to the best possible care for the animals and ensures that all animal use meets or exceeds the guidelines established by the Canadian Council on Animal Care (CCAC).

== History ==
In the 1980s, Agriculture and Agri-Food Canada identified both the need for new laboratories including high-containment space (Containment Level 3 and 4). Around the same time, Health Canada was also considering the need to replace outdated laboratories and add Containment Level 4. Numerous benefits were identified for housing both laboratories in one building and Winnipeg was chosen as the site; an announcement was made in October 1987.

After some debate, the spot chosen for the site was a city works yard near to the Health Sciences Centre (a major teaching hospital), the University of Manitoba’s medical school, and other life science organizations. Construction of the facility that came to be named the Canadian Science Centre for Human and Animal Health (often referred to locally as “the Virology Lab”) began with an official groundbreaking in December 1992. The design team, headed by the Winnipeg-based Smith Carter Architects and Engineers Inc., visited 30 laboratories to seek best practices in containment and design. Construction finished toward the end of 1997, with the first programs beginning in the spring of 1998 and all laboratories coming on line after that. The official opening took place in 1999.

By the time the animal health programs began moving into the new facility, they had become part of the new Canadian Food Inspection Agency. The agency was created in April 1997 by the Canadian Food Inspection Agency Act for the purpose of combining and integrating the related inspection services of three separate federal government departments: Agriculture and Agri-Food Canada, Fisheries and Oceans Canada, and Health Canada. The establishment of the CFIA consolidated the delivery of all federal food safety, animal health, and plant health regulatory programs.

== Containment ==
In addition to operating a Containment Level (CL) 2 laboratory as well as extensive CL3 laboratories, NCFAD also operates a Containment Level 4 laboratory, which provides the capability to work safely with the most serious viruses. A Level 4 laboratory is designed for agents that usually produce very serious and untreatable diseases, which can be spread easily through airborne or casual contact. All animal diseases classed as Level 4 are zoonotic, meaning that they can transfer to humans. Staff wear pressurized biosafety suits which are disinfected after each session. All air and waste are sterilized on exit.

== Workforce ==
NCFAD maintains a staff of approximately 65 people; primarily scientists and laboratory technicians.
