= True Health Diagnostics =

- Founded: 2014
- Purpose: Healthcare Services
- Location: Frisco, Texas
- Region served: United States
- Key people: Founder and CEO Chris Grottenthaler
- Website: truehealthdiag.com

True Health Diagnostics was founded by Chris Grottenthaler in March 2014 in Frisco, Texas, a clinical laboratory company to sell and develop medical tests. Grottenthaler had formerly worked in private equity. True Health was CLIA certified in Texas in August 2014 and offered its first tests in October of that year.

True Health hired several sales representatives who had worked for BlueWave, a contract sales organization. However, True Health did not hire any of the owners or leadership of BluWave In September 2015 True Health purchased the assets of a bankrupt competing company, Health Diagnostic Laboratory, Inc. at a court-supervised auction for $37.1 million. HDL had around 550 employees in Richmond, Virginia, and had gone bankrupt after a $47 million settlement with the US Department of Justice over allegations that HDL had bribed doctors to send business its way; True Health assumed a corporate integrity agreement that HDL had signed as part of the settlement. HDL had run sales through BlueWave, and BlueWave had been named as a party in the DoJ Investigation; HDL had split with BlueWave in January 2015 during the investigation, and in April, before it filed for bankruptcy, HDL had tried to get a court to examine whether the former BlueWave employees working with True Health were interfering with HDL's business.

As of November 2015 True Health had retained about 350 of HDL's employees in Richmond and was processing samples in HDL's former CLIA facility.

In July 2016 a post in CardiBrief called out several sales practices of True Health as examples of "a wide variety of new scams to gain new business...that emerged in the wake of the collapse and bankruptcy of Health Diagnostics Laboratory." These practices included setting up labs that would be majority-owned by the testing company and minority-owned by individual doctors. Those doctors could then financially benefit without owning the lab to send tests, which would be illegal; another was offering management services through blood-drawing service providers.

In December 2016 the company started offering hospitals and medical practices laboratory management services.

In April 2017 True Health started offering genetic testing to determine a person's risk for developing hereditary cancers.

In July 2019 True Health Diagnostics filed for Chapter 11 Bankruptcy. According to filings, the company will be laying off about 80 employees. On August 23, 2019, the company filed a Notice of Sale of Property Free and Clear of Liens. No stalking horse bidder has been identified.
