= Australian Centre for Disease Preparedness =

High-security laboratory for exotic diseases

Coordinates: 38.151°S 144.389°E

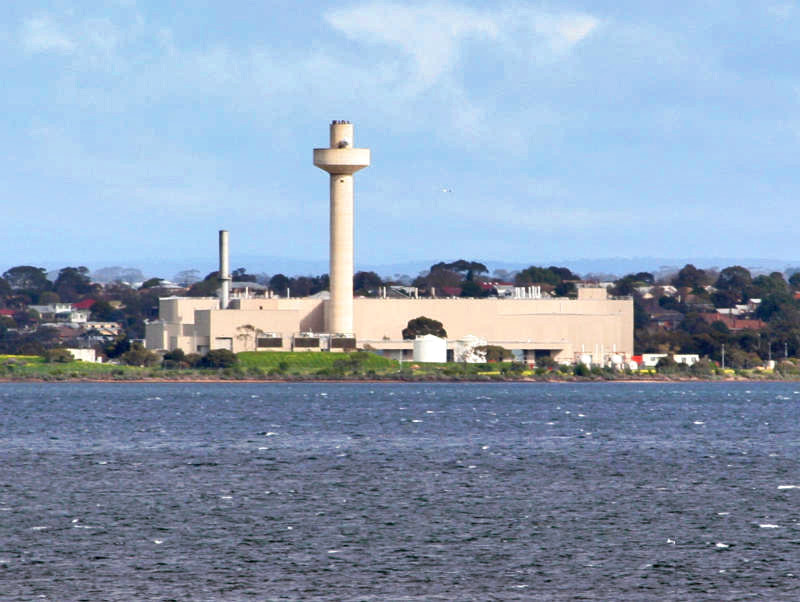
Australian Centre for Disease Preparedness

The Australian Centre for Disease Preparedness (ACDP), formerly known as the Australian Animal Health Laboratory (AAHL), in Geelong, Victoria, Australia is a high security laboratory, run by the CSIRO for exotic animal disease diagnosis and research. The lab is one of four Biosafety Level-4 labs in the country.

It opened in 1985 costing $185 million.

In November 2012, the ACDP delivered an experimental vaccine to help protect horses against the deadly Hendra virus.

== History ==
In 1977, Jim Peacock of the Australian Academy of Science asked Bill Snowdon, then Chief CSIRO AAHL if he could have the newly released USA NIH and the British equivalent requirements for the development of infrastructure for biocontainment reviewed by AAHL personnel with a view to recommending the adoption of one of them by Australian authorities. The review was carried out by CSIRO AAHL Project Manager Bill Curnow and CSIRO Engineer Arthur Jenkins. They drafted outcomes for each of the levels of security. AAHL was notionally classified as "substantially beyond P4". These were adopted by the Australian Academy of Science and became the basis for Australian legislation.

The Australian Centre for Disease Preparedness was commissioned in 1985 as the Australian Animal Health Laboratory, includes a number of laboratories and animal house facilities capable of operating at three steps of negative pressure below the lowest pressure within any part of the extramural wind-zone of the building exterior. External pressure and the cascaded negative pressure zones are measured and maintained in real time by electronic sensors, electronically controlled supply and exhaust air handling systems and purpose developed predictive logic controllers in support of management protocols to manage airlocks, access and services to prevent loss or ingress of potentially contaminated gases, solids or liquids. Supply air is protected by two 0.001 HEPA filters in tandem, (series mounted) with appropriate pre-filters in purpose designed individual housings. Filters and housings in pairs are then mounted as multiples in parallel according to airflow and volume requirement. This configuration allows the de-contamination, testing and/or replacement of any individual filter without the need to shut down operation. For exhaust air, similar filtration hardware and management arrangements apply. However, at least one stage of exhaust protection of a method not relying on filtration is provided. In the case of AAHL, the system adopted by CSIRO was "air incineration" at 1000 C and a retention/dwell time of more than 4 seconds at that temperature. Liquid scrubbing to prevent escape of formaldehyde is fitted after the afterburner for protection of the environment. Waste liquids can be dosed chemically in steam jacketed stainless steel tanks as the first barrier, followed by heating under pressure and maintained at elevated temperature for an appropriate time. Multiple tanks can be configured in tandem or in parallel according to need.

AAHL was designed and built before there were any regulations covering bio-containment. The later regulations were written by AAHL personnel. AAHL Staff were at pains to ensure that AAHL could contain any known or yet to be discovered organism. Politically there was opposition to the notion of having the facility at all. The Prime Minister Malcolm Fraser, although in favor of the project, threatened serious consequences for management if the design team "got it wrong".

Innovation in the design delivered cost savings of between $30M and $50M so the design team felt that it was better to err on the safe side than to face the prospect of an angry PM. AAHL was very cost effective and safe as a result. The Australian Animal Health Laboratory is a Class 4/ P4 Laboratory.

The facility was renamed to the Australian Centre for Disease Preparedness in April 2020.
