= Occupational injury =

Bodily damage resulting from working

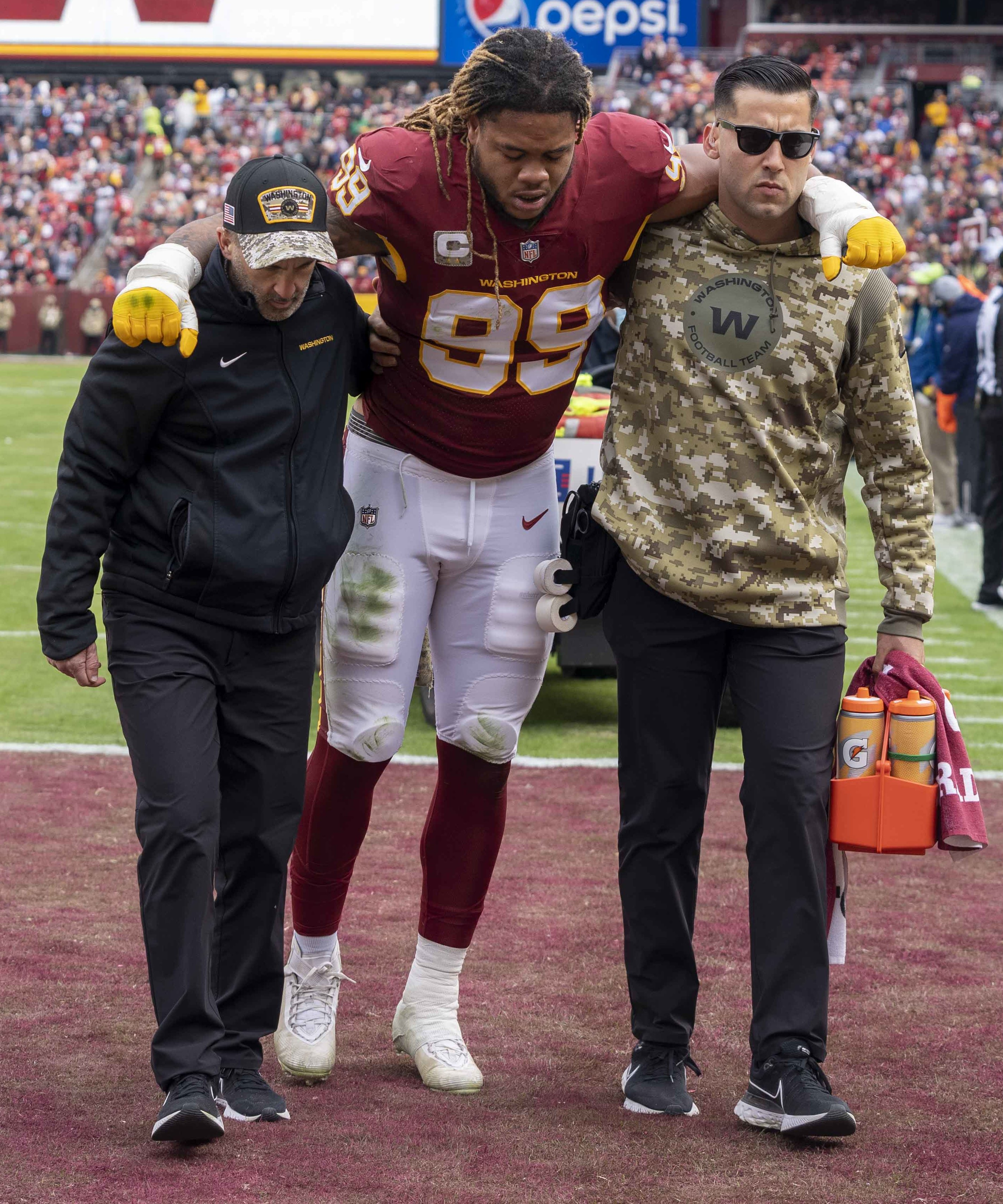
Knee injury to Chase Young, 2021

An occupational injury is bodily damage resulting from working. The most common organs involved are the spine, hands, the head, lungs, eyes, skeleton, and skin. Occupational injuries can result from exposure to occupational hazards (physical, chemical, biological, or psychosocial), such as temperature, noise, insect or animal bites, blood-borne pathogens, aerosols, hazardous chemicals, radiation, and occupational burnout.

While many prevention methods are set in place, injuries may still occur due to poor ergonomics, manual handling of heavy loads, misuse or failure of equipment, exposure to general hazards, and inadequate safety training.

Fatal occupational injuries among employees

Non fatal occupational injuries per 100000

== Worldwide ==
It has been estimated that worldwide there are more than 350,000 workplace fatalities and more than 270 million workplace injuries annually. In 2000 there were approximately 2.9 billion workers worldwide. Occupational injuries resulted in the loss of 3.5 years of healthy life for every 1,000 workers. 300,000 of the occupational injuries resulted in a fatality.

The most common occupations associated with these hazards vary throughout the world depending on the major industries in a particular country. Overall, the most hazardous occupations are in farming, fishing, and forestry. In more developed countries, construction and manufacturing occupations are associated with high rates of spine, hand, and wrist injuries.

== By country ==
=== United States ===
In the United States in 2012, 4,383 workers died from job injuries, 92% of which were men, and nearly 3 million nonfatal workplace injuries & illness were reported which cost businesses a collective loss of $198.2 billion and 60 million workdays. In 2007, 5,488 workers died from job injuries, 92% of which were men, and 49,000 died from work-related injuries. NIOSH estimates that 4 million workers in the U.S. in 2007 sustained non-fatal work related injuries or illnesses.

Within the U. S. construction industry, the most common work-related fatal injury occurs from worksite falls. Fall prevention is essential. Federal regulations and industry consensus standards provide specific measures and performance-based recommendations for fall prevention and protection. However, persistent unsafe practices and low safety culture across many industries define steady fall injury rates each year. Reducing fall injury and death rates require:

- Implementing new effective fall prevention and protection technologies
- Using appropriate PPE like harnesses, fall guards, and slip-resistant footwear
- Improving the work safety culture by educating the workforce

According to data from the National Institute for Occupational Safety and Health (NIOSH) and the Bureau of Labor Statistics, an average of 15 workers die from traumatic injuries each day in the United States, and an additional 200 workers are hospitalized.

In a study in the state of Washington, injured workers were followed for 14 years to determine the long term effects of work injury on employment. The work injuries resulted in an average of 1.06 years of lost productivity for each of the 31,588 allowed claims.

In 2010, 25% of occupational injuries and illnesses that were not fatal but caused work absences were related to injuries to the upper limb.

==== Dangerous sectors ====
In the U.S. the Bureau of Labor Statistics makes available extensive statistics on workplace accidents and injuries. For example:

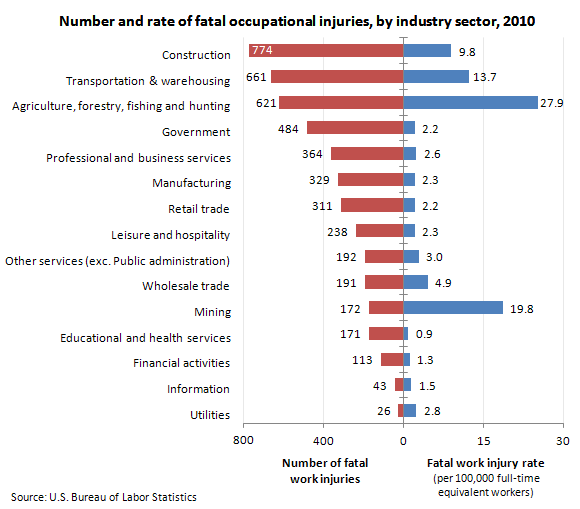

==== Common injuries ====
As in the United Kingdom, slips, trips and falls (STF) are common and account for 20-40% of disabling occupational injuries. Often these accidents result in a back injury that can persist to a permanent disability. In the United States, a high risk of back injuries occurs in the health care industry. 25% of reported injuries in health care workers in the state of Pennsylvania are for back pain. Among nurses, the prevalence of lower back pain may be as high as 72% mostly as a result of transferring patients. Some of these injuries can be prevented with the availability of patient lifts, improved worker training, and allocation of more time to perform work procedures. Another common type of injury is carpal tunnel syndrome associated with overuse of the hands and wrists. Studies on a cohort of newly hired workers have thus far identified forceful gripping, repetitive lifting of > 1 kg, and using vibrating power tools as high risk work activities.

Additionally, noise exposure in the workplace can cause hearing loss, which accounted for 14% of reported occupational illnesses in 2007. Many initiatives have been created to prevent this common workplace injury. For example, the Buy Quiet program encourages employers to purchase tools and machines that produce less noise and the Safe-In-Sound Award was created to recognize companies and program that excel in the area of hearing loss prevention.

Accidental injection or needlestick injuries are a common injury that plague agriculture workers and veterinarians. The majority of these injuries are located to the hands or legs, and can result in mild to severe reactions, including possible hospitalization. Due to the wide variety of biologics used in animal agriculture, needlestick injuries can result in bacterial or fungal infections, lacerations, local inflammation, vaccine/antibiotic reactions, amputations, miscarriage, and death. Due to daily human-animal interactions, livestock related injuries are also a prevalent injury of agriculture workers, and are responsible for the majority of nonfatal worker injuries on dairy farms. Additionally, approximately 30 people die of cattle and horse-related deaths in the United States annually.

==== Employees at risk ====
Perhaps the most important personal factor that predisposes to an increased risk is age. In the United States in 1998 17 million workers were over age 55 and by 2018 this population is expected to more than double. Workers in this age group are more likely to develop lower back pain that may be worsened by work conditions that normally do not affect a younger worker. Older workers are also more likely to be killed in a construction related fall. They are also at higher risk for injury due to age-related hearing loss, visual impairment, and use of multiple prescription medications that has been linked to higher rates of work injuries. In addition to age, other personal risk factors for injury include obesity particularly its associated risk with back injury, and depression.

Lack of proper education or training can also predispose an individual to an occupational injury. For example, there is limited needlestick injury awareness among agriculture workers, and there is a need for comprehensive programs to prevent needlestick injuries on livestock operations. Proper animal handling techniques and training, or stockmanship, can also decrease the risk of livestock injury. A handler's timing, positioning, speed, direction of movement, and sounds made will affect the behavior of an animal and consequently the safety of the handler. The agriculture industry has begun to focus more on proper education and training, and has made a variety of resources available to producers. For example, organizations like the Upper Midwest Agriculture Safety and Health Center (UMASH) have a variety of informational fact sheets and training videos easily accessible online. Additionally, organizations like Beef Quality Assurance offers stockmanship training seminars and demonstrations.

==== Regulation ====
In the United States, the Occupational Safety and Health Administration (OSHA) sets and enforces national standards for occupational safety across all sectors.

=== United Kingdom ===
In the UK, a total of 111 fatal injuries happened in a single year. According to the HSE, a total of 111 workers died in work related injuries in the UK during 2019–20. The biggest cause for these fatal injuries was falling from heights that alone was responsible for 29 deaths during the same year. Other causes include injuries from moving vehicles and other objects, and contact with the moving machinery.

In the United Kingdom in 2013–2014, 133 people were killed at work. Of those 133 people, 89 were employed, while 44 were self-employed. In 2013–2014, an estimated 629,000 injuries occurred at work. Of these injuries 629,000 injuries, 203,000 led to more than 3 days absence from work. Of these, over 148,000 resulted in them being absent from work for more than 7 days.

==== Dangerous sectors ====
- Construction: 42 deaths
- Agriculture: 27 deaths
- Waste and Recycling: four deaths
- Other: 60 deaths

Of all the workplace accidents that resulted in death, the most common were falls from height, contact with moving machinery and being struck by a vehicle. These types of accidents resulted in over half of all recorded deaths.

==== Common injuries ====
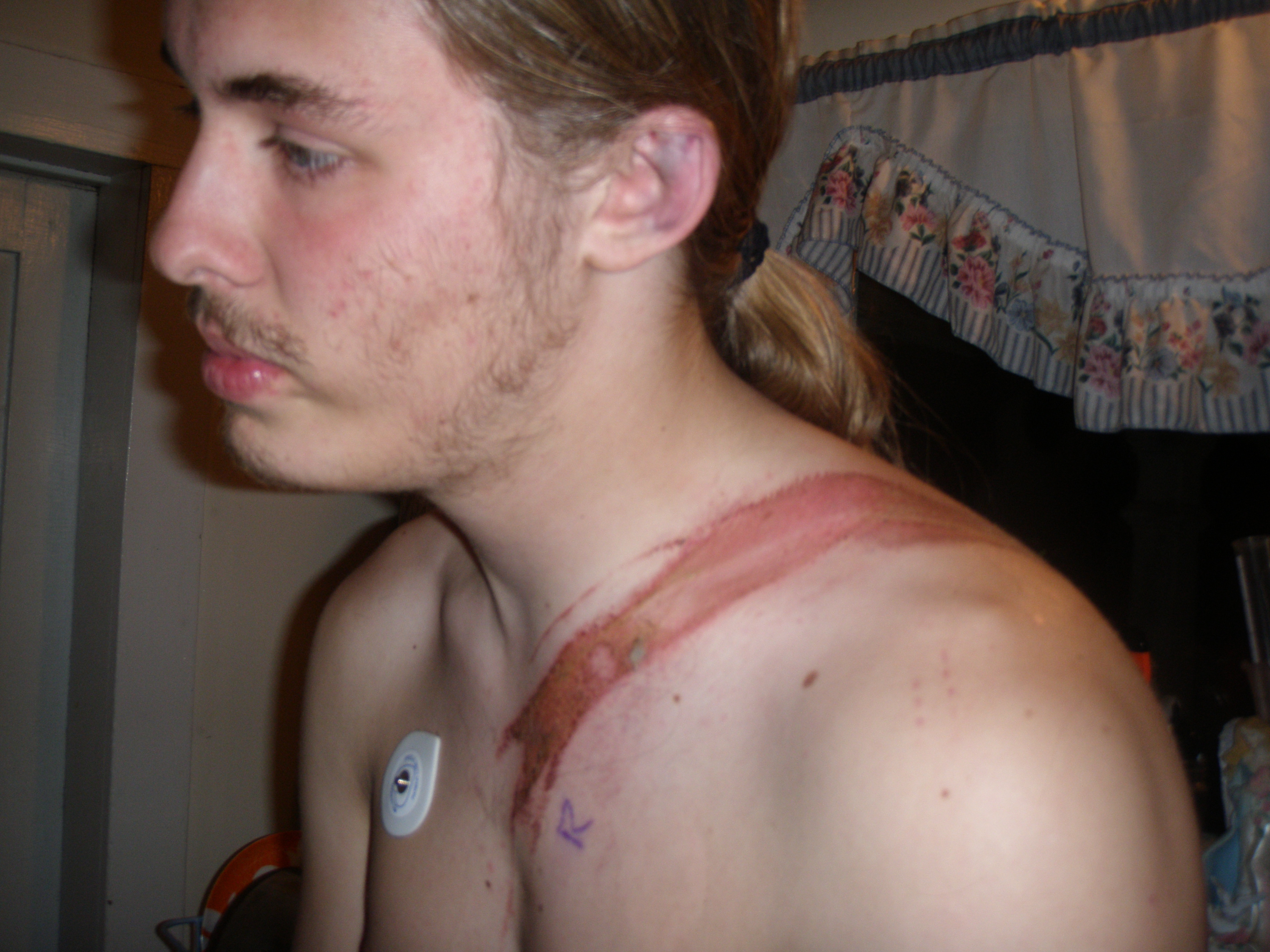
Vehicle accident injury depression

Slips, trips and falls account for over a third of all injuries that happen at work. Incorrect handling of items was the most common cause of injuries that led to absences from work of more than 7 days. In 2010–2011, injuries to the upper limb injuries made up 47% of non-fatal injuries at work in the UK.

In all, over 1,900,000 working days were lost in 2013–2014 due to slips, trips and falls.

==== Employees at risk ====
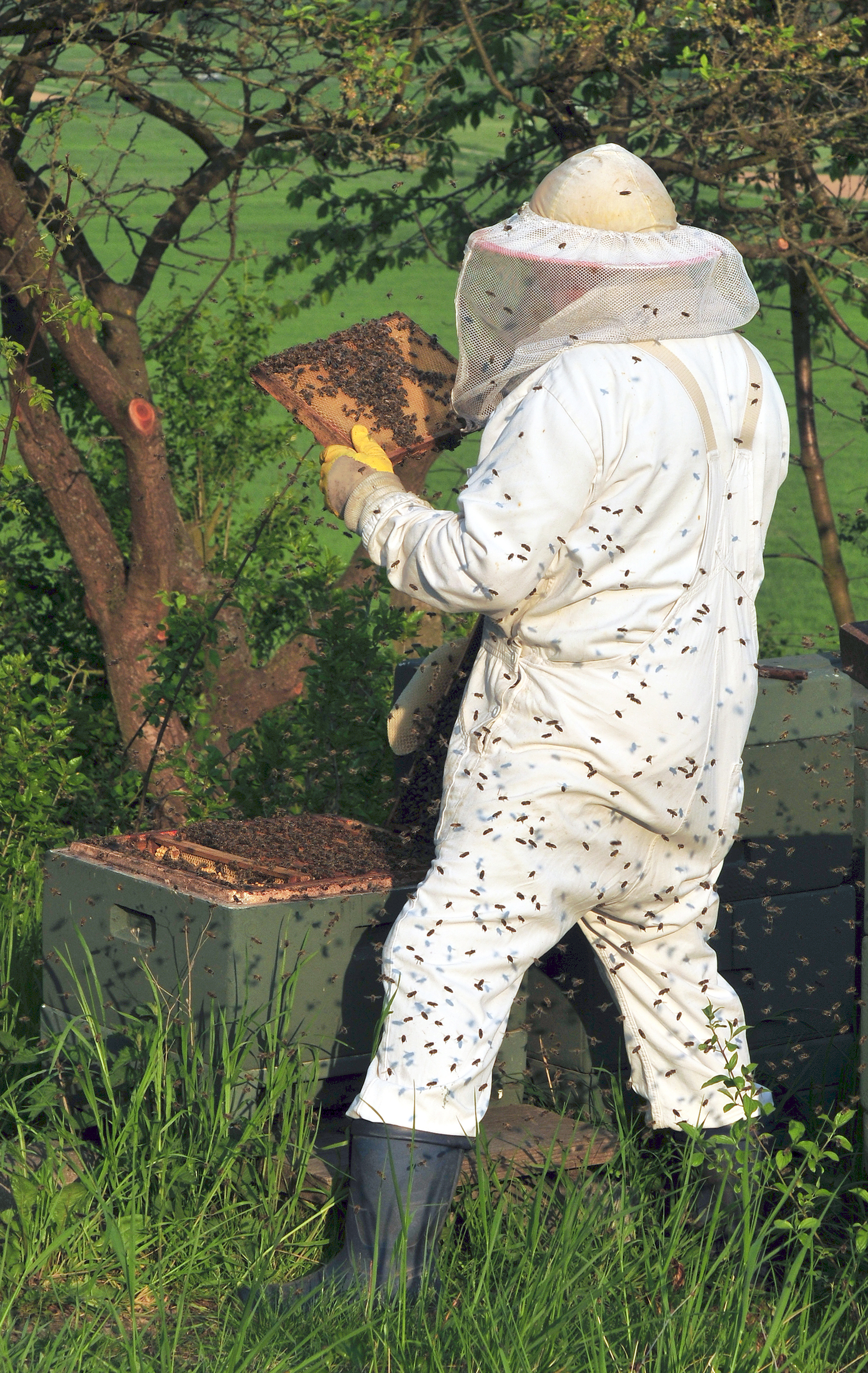
Beekeeper keeping bees

Unsurprisingly, occupation is the biggest influence on the risk of workplace injuries. Workers new to the job are at a much higher risk of injury than more experienced staff, while shift workers and part-time staff also have a greater risk of being injured at work.

The research shows that the amount of time employees worked was strongly linked to muscle and joint issues in the neck, lower back, left elbow, and right wrist.

==== Employer prosecutions ====
The Health & Safety Executive (HSE) prosecuted 582 cases in 2013–2014, with at least one conviction secured in 547 cases (94%).

Local authorities prosecuted a total of 92 cases during the same period, with at least one conviction achieved in 89 cases (97%).

A total of 13,790 notices were issued by the HSE and local authorities, with over £16,700,000 issued in fines.

=== Taiwan ===
Traumatic injuries to the upper limbs are the most frequent type of injury at work in Taiwan. In 2010, there were 14,261 occupational injuries recorded in 2010 and 45% of these involved trauma to the upper limbs.

== Prevention ==
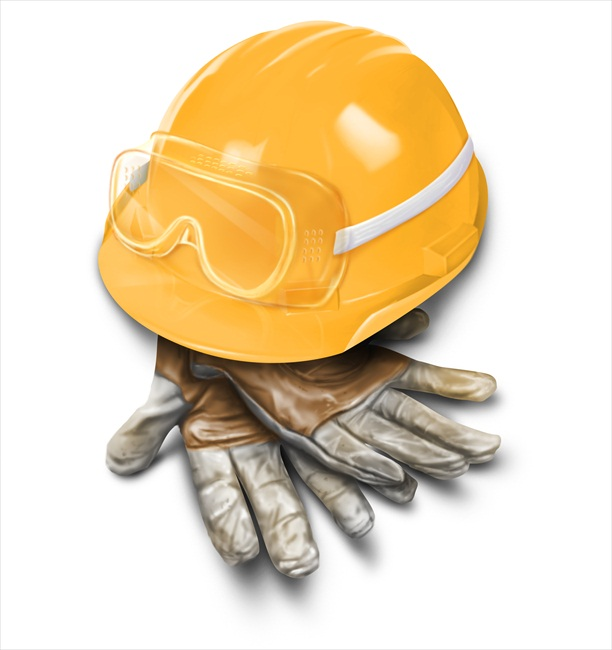
Occupational safety equipment

There are many methods of preventing or reducing industrial injuries, including anticipation of problems by risk assessment, safety training, control banding, personal protective equipment safety guards, mechanisms on machinery, and safety barriers. In addition, past problems can be analyzed to find their root causes by using a technique called root cause analysis. A 2013 Cochrane review found low-quality evidence showing that inspections, especially focused inspections, can reduce work-related injuries in the long term.

== See also ==
- Occupational safety and health
- Occupational disease
- Occupational exposure banding
- Safety culture
- Work accident
