= EFO =

EFO may refer to:

- Eddie From Ohio, an American folk band
- Einsatzstab Fähre Ost, a World War II German naval detachment
- Emmett Furla Oasis Films, a company specializing in action movies
- Energy For Opportunity, a Canadian development charity
- Errors, freaks, and oddities, non-standard stamps
- Étoile Filante de Ouagadougou, a Burkinabe football club
- Euroformula Open Championship, a single-seater racing championship
- Experimental factor ontology
- Établissements Français de l'Océanie, now French Polynesia
