= Control of Substances Hazardous to Health Regulations 2002 =

United Kingdom health and safety legislation

- Statutory Instrument
- Parliament of the United Kingdom
- Citation: SI 2002/2677
- Introduced by: Nick Brown, Department for Work and Pensions
- Territorial extent: England and Wales, Scotland, overseas

Dates
- Made: 24 October 2002
- Laid before Parliament: 31 October 2002
- Commencement: 21 November 2002
Other legislation
Repeals/revokes	Control of Substances Hazardous to Health Regulations 1999
Made under	European Communities Act 1972; Health and Safety at Work etc. Act 1974
Amended by	SI 2003/978; SI 2004/3386

Status: Current legislation

Text of statute as originally enacted

Text of the Control of Substances Hazardous to Health Regulations 2002 as in force today (including any amendments) within the United Kingdom, from legislation.gov.uk.

The Control of Substances Hazardous to Health Regulations 2002 (SI 2002/2677) is a United Kingdom statutory instrument which states general requirements imposed on employers to protect employees and other persons from the hazards of substances used at work by risk assessment, control of exposure, health surveillance and incident planning. There are also duties on employees to take care of their own exposure to hazardous substances and prohibitions on the import of certain substances into the European Economic Area. The regulations reenacted, with amendments, the Control of Substances Hazardous to Work Regulations 1999 (SI 1999/437) and implement several European Union directives.

Breach of the regulations by an employer or employee is a crime, punishable on summary conviction or on indictment by an unlimited fine. Either an individual or a corporation can be punished, and sentencing practice is published by the Sentencing Council. Enforcement is the responsibility of the Health and Safety Executive or in some cases, local authorities.

The regulations are complementary to the Chemicals (Hazard Information and Packaging for Supply) Regulations 2002 (SI 2002/1689) (CHIPS) and the EU's CLP Regulation which require labelling of hazardous substances by suppliers. There are other regulations concerning the labelling and signage of pipes and containers (Sch.7), and since 2008 a further level of control mechanism on dangerous chemicals was added by the EU regulation on Registration, Evaluation, Authorisation and Restriction of Chemicals (REACH).

The Control of Substances Hazardous to Health (COSHH) regulations have been in place for more than 25 years and the scientific evidence suggests that over this time industry has, in general, been consistently reducing exposure to hazardous substances.

== European legislation implemented ==
The regulations implement the following European Union (EU) directives:

- Council directive 78/610/EEC, on the approximation of the laws, regulations and administrative provisions of EU member states on the protection of the health of workers exposed to vinyl chloride monomer;
- Council Directive 89/677/EEC, art.1(3) the importation, supply or use of benzene and substances containing benzene, amending the Marketing and Use Directive, 76/796/EEC;
- In part, Commission directive 96/55/EC, the second adaptation to technical progress of the Marketing and Use Directive;
- Individual directives under 89/391/EEC, Art.16(1):
  - Council Directive 90/394/EEC, on the protection of workers from risks related to exposure to carcinogens at work, insofar as it relates to carcinogens other than asbestos;
  - Council Directive 98/24/EC, on the protection of the health and safety of workers from risks related to chemical agents at work, insofar as it relates to risks to health from exposure to substances other than asbestos or lead; and
  - European Parliament and Council Directive 2000/54/EC, on the protection of workers from risks related to exposure to biological agents at work.

The regulations are consistent with Commission Directive 91/322/EEC requirements on indicative limit values.

== Prohibited substances ==
=== Import prohibited ===
Import is prohibited into the UK, other than from another EU member state or member of the European Economic Area, of (reg.4(2)):

- 2-naphthylamine, benzidine, 4-aminodiphenyl, 4-nitrodiphenyl, their salts and any substance containing any of those compounds in a total concentration equal to or greater than 0.1% by mass;
- Matches made with white phosphorus.

Contravention is an offence under the Customs and Excise Management Act 1979 rather than health and safety regulations.

=== Supply prohibited ===
Supply is prohibited, during the course of work or for use at work, of (reg.4(3), (4)/ Sch.2, item.11):

- Any of the substances whose import is prohibited;
- Benzene and any substance containing benzene in a concentration equal to or greater than 0.1% by mass, but excluding:
  - Motor fuels covered by Council Directive 85/210/EEC;
  - Waste covered by Council Directive 75/442/EEC.

=== Prohibited for specified purposes ===
Use of the following substances is prohibited for the purposes specified (reg.4(1)/ Sch.2):

Substance	Prohibited purpose
2-naphthylamine; Benzidine; 4-aminodiphenyl; 4-nitrodiphenyl; —their salts and any substance containing any of those compounds, in a total concentration equal to or greater than 0.1% by mass.	Manufacture and use for all purposes, including any manufacturing process in which such a substance is formed.
Sand or other substance containing free silica.	Use as an abrasive for blasting articles in any blasting apparatus.
A substance: Containing compounds of silicon calculated as silica to the extent of more than 3% by weight of dry material, other than natural sand, zirconium silicate, calcined china clay, calcined aluminous fireclay, sillimanite, calcined or fused alumina, olivine; or; Composed of, or containing, dust or other matter deposited from a fettling or blasting process.	Use as a parting material in connection with the making of metal castings.
Carbon disulphide	Use in the cold-cure process of vulcanisation in the proofing of cloth with rubber.
Oils other than white oil, or oil of entirely animal or vegetable, or mixed animal-vegetable, origin.	Use for oiling the spindles of self-acting spinning mules.
Ground or powdered flint or quartz other than natural sand.	Certain uses in the manufacture and decoration of pottery (slops or pastes permitted for some purposes).
Dust or powder of a refractory material containing not less than 80% of silica other than natural sand.	Use for sprinkling the moulds of silica bricks, namely bricks or other articles composed of refractory material and containing not less than 80 per cent of silica.
White phosphorus	Manufacture of matches
Hydrogen cyanide	Fumigation except where certain specified precautions are taken.
Benzene and any substance containing benzene in a concentration equal to or greater than 0.1% by mass, but excluding: Motor fuels covered by Council Directive 85/210/EEC; Waste covered by Council Directive 75/442/EEC.	Use for all purposes except: Industrial processes; and; Research and development or for the purpose of chemical analysis.
Chloroform (CAS No. 67-66-3); Carbon tetrachloride (CAS No. 56-23-5); 1,1,2-Trichloroethane (CAS No. 79-00-5); 1,1,2,2-Tetrachloroethane (CAS No. 79-34-5); 1,1,1,2-Tetrachloroethane (CAS No. 630-20-6); Pentachloroethane (CAS No. 76-01-7); Vinylidene chloride (CAS No. 75-35-4); 1,1,1-Trichloroethane (CAS No. 71-55-6); — and any substance containing one or more of those substances in a concentration equal to or greater than 0.1% by mass, other than: Medicinal products; Cosmetic products.	Supply for use at work in diffusive applications such as in surface cleaning and the cleaning of fabrics except for the purposes of research and development or for the purpose of analysis.

== Exceptions ==
The following are excluded from the operation of regulations 6 to 13 concerning the general process for management and control of hazardous substances (reg.5):

- Circumstances covered by the:
  - Coal Mines (Respirable Dust) Regulations 1975 (SI 1975/1433, as amended by the Coal Mines (Respirable Dust) (Amendment) Regulations 1978 (SI 1978/807)
  - Control of Lead at Work Regulations 2002 (SI 2002/2676)
  - Control of Asbestos Regulations 2012 (SI 2002/2675)
- Substances hazardous to health solely by virtue of their radioactive, explosive or flammable properties, or solely because they are at high or low temperature or high pressure;
- Risks arising solely from medical or dental treatment.

== Requirements ==
=== Risk assessment ===
Regulation 6 requires that an employer should not carry out work liable to expose employees and non-employees, such as members of the public to a substance hazardous to health without a risk assessment and implementation of the steps necessary to comply with the regulations. The assessment must include consideration of any information provided by the supplier of a substance (CHIPS) (reg.6(2)(b)) and must be reviewed regularly, and also when there is reason to think the assessment is no longer valid, if the system of work is changed or if necessary because of the results of health monitoring (reg.6(3)). The assessment must also consider any occupational exposure limit, in particular, those mandated by the HSE (reg.6(2)(f)) or by the workplace activities

=== Prevention or control of exposure ===
Regulation 7 requires that an employer prevent exposure to hazardous substances or, if this is not reasonably practicable, that they adequately control exposure. One of the main points of the COSHH risk assessment is to identify the measures that are to be used to avoid a hazard or reduce the level of risk associated with a hazard. Employers must ensure that exposure to hazardous substances is prevented or, if this is not reasonably practicable, adequately controlled. Ideally, this will mean preventing exposure by:

- removing hazardous substance, by changing the process;
- substituting it with a safe or safer substance, or using it in a safer form.

Where this is not reasonably practicable, controlling exposure by, for example:

- totally enclosing the process (such as a shot-blasting box);
- using partial enclosure and/or extraction equipment (such as a spray painting booth);
- general ventilation;
- using safe systems of work and handling procedures (written procedures, etc.).

It is for the employer to decide on the method of controlling exposure. The regulations, however, limit the use of personal protective equipment (e.g. respirators, dust marks, protective clothing), as the means of protection to only those situations where other measures cannot adequately control exposure.

=== Use of control measures ===
Employers must take all reasonable steps to ensure that control measures, and any necessary equipment of facilities, are properly used or applied (reg.8(1)). Employees must use the control measures properly, return them after use and report any defective equipment (reg.8(2)).

=== Maintenance and testing of control measures ===
Regulation 9 requires that employers maintain control measures in efficient working order and in good repair, with thorough examination and testing of local exhaust ventilation plant generally every 14 months, and for other controls "at suitable intervals".

=== Monitoring exposure ===
Where the risk assessment indicates that workplace monitoring of exposure is necessary, the employer must perform such monitoring unless they can demonstrate another means of preventing or controlling exposure (reg.10). Monitoring must be at regular intervals in addition to when a change occurs that may affect exposure (reg.10(3)). There is mandatory monitoring for (reg.10(4)):

Substance or process	Minimum frequency
Vinyl chloride monomer	Continuous or in accordance with a procedure approved by the HSE
Spray given off from vessels at which an electrolytic chromium process is carried on, except trivalent chromium	Every 14 days

=== Health surveillance ===
Regulation 11 requires that health surveillance of employees is carried out where:

- An identifiable disease or adverse health effect may be related to the exposure;
- There is a "reasonable likelihood" that the disease or health effect may occur under the particular conditions of work;
- Valid techniques exist for detecting indications of the disease of health effect; and
- The technique presents a low risk to the employee;

— or where there is exposure to any of the following substances in the specified occupations:

Substance	Process
Vinyl chloride monomer	Manufacture, production, reclamation, storage, discharge, transport, use or polymerisation
Nitro or amino derivatives of phenol and of benzene or its homologues	Manufacture of nitro or amino derivatives of phenol and of benzene or its homologues, and the making of explosives with the use of any of these substances
Potassium chromate, potassium dichromate, sodium chromate or sodium dichromate	Manufacturing
Ortho-tolidine, dianisidine and dichlorobenzidine, and their salts	Manufacturing
Auramine and magenta	Manufacturing
Carbon disulphide, disulphur dichloride, benzene, including benzole, carbon tetrachloride and trichlorethylene	Processes in which these substances are used, or given off as vapour, in the manufacture of indiarubber or of articles or goods made wholly or partially of indiarubber
Pitch	Manufacture of blocks of fuel consisting of coal, coal dust, coke or slurry with pitch as a binding substance

=== Information, instruction and training ===
Regulation 12 demands that all employees liable to exposure to hazardous substances are provided with suitable and sufficient information, instruction and training, including:

- Details of the hazardous substances including:
  - Names of substances and the risk that they present to health;
  - Any relevant occupational exposure standard, maximum exposure limit or similar occupational exposure limit;
  - Access to any relevant safety data sheet;
- Other legislative provisions which concern the hazardous properties of those substances;
- Significant findings of risk assessment;
- Appropriate precautions and actions to be taken by the employee in order to safeguard himself and other employees at the workplace;
- Results of any monitoring of exposure and, in particular, in the case of a substance hazardous to health for which a maximum exposure limit has been approved, the employee or his representatives shall be informed forthwith, if the results of such monitoring show that the maximum exposure limit has been exceeded; and
- Collective results of any health surveillance undertaken in a form calculated to prevent those results from being identified as relating to a particular person.

Some biological agents can cause severe human disease and be a serious hazard to employees. Further diseases may be likely to spread to the community and there may be no effective prophylaxis or treatment available. Where employees are working with such an agent, or material that may contain such an agent, they must be provided with written instructions and, if appropriate, notices must be displayed that outline the procedures for handling such an agent or material.

=== Accidents, incidents and emergencies ===
Regulation 13 requires that employers prepare for possible accidents, incidents and emergencies involving hazardous substances by:

- Preparing emergency procedures, including provision of first aid;
- Making available technical information on possible accidents and hazards and bringing it to the attention of the emergency services; and
- Installing alarms and other warnings and communication systems.

== Fumigation ==
Regulation 14 requires that appropriate warning notices are affixed to premises that are to be fumigated with hydrogen cyanide, phosphine or methyl bromide. In most cases, notice must be given to any harbour authority in whose area the fumigation is to take place.

== Exemptions ==
The HSE may issue certificates of exemption to certain employers so long as they are satisfied that the health and safety of workers will not be compromised (reg.15). The Secretary of State for Defence may issue certificates of exemption on the grounds of national security to the UK and visiting armed forces (reg.16).

== Record keeping ==
An employer with five or more employees must record the results of the risk assessment (reg.6(4)).

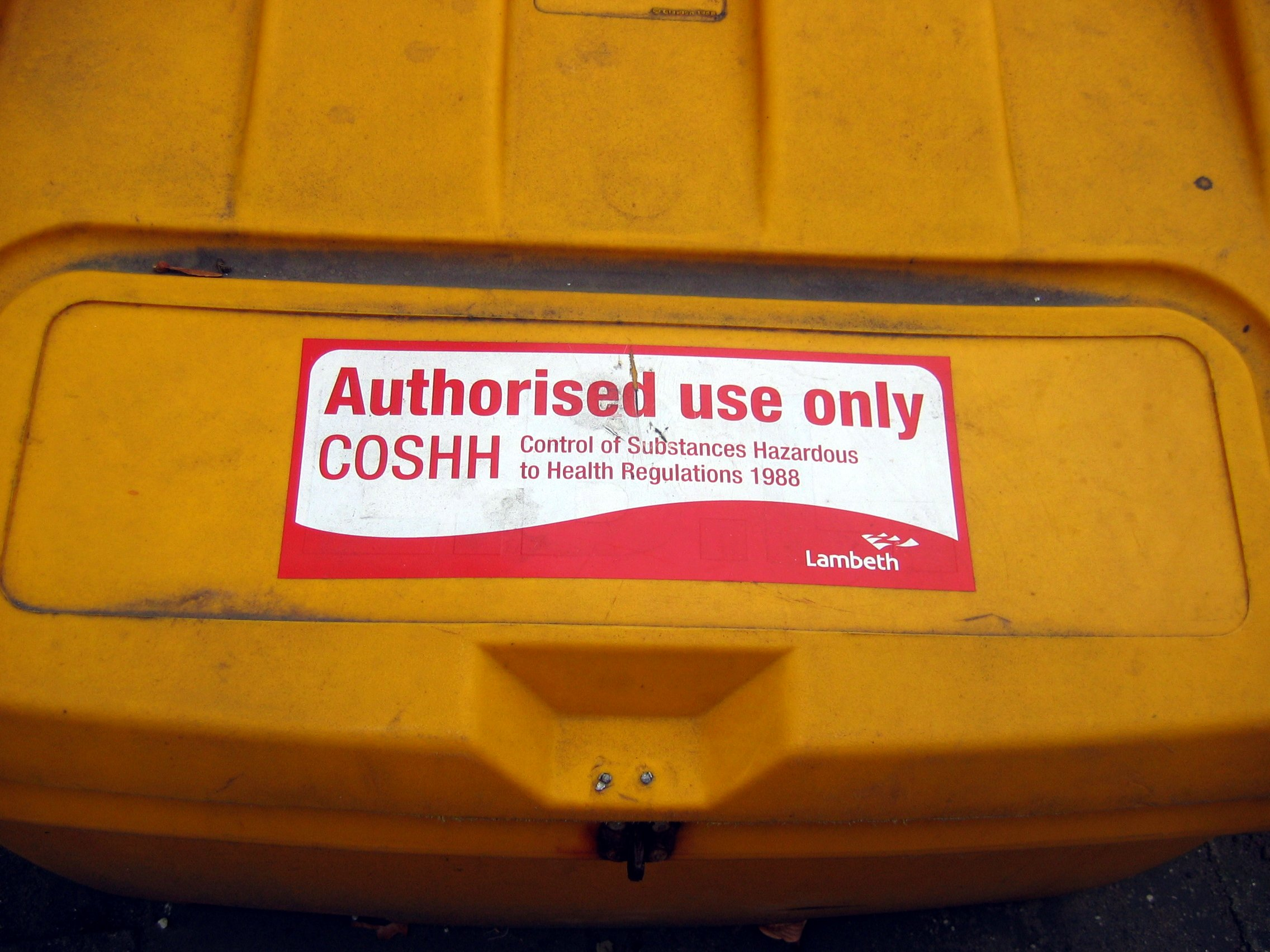
A roadside bin with a COSHH notice

== Regulations on labelling of containers and pipes ==
- Chemicals (Hazard Information and Packaging for Supply) Regulations 2002 (SI 2002/1689)
- Health and Safety (Safety Signs and Signals) Regulations 1996 (SI 1996/341)
- Radioactive Material (Road Transport) Regulations 2002 (SI 2002/1093)
- Carriage of Dangerous Goods by Rail Regulations 1996 (SI 1996/2089)
- Packaging, Labelling and Carriage of Radioactive Material by Rail Regulations 2002 (SI 2002/2099)
- Carriage of Dangerous Goods (Classification, Packaging and Labelling) and Use of Transportable Pressure Receptacles Regulations 1996 (SI 1996/2092)
- Carriage of Explosives by Road Regulations 1996 (SI 1996/2093)
- Carriage of Dangerous Goods by Road Regulations 1996 (SI 1996/2095)
- Good Laboratory Practice Regulations 1999 (SI 1999/3106)
- Acetylene Regulations 2014 (SI 2014/1639)

== Bibliography ==
- [Various authors] (2007). Tolley's Health and Safety at Work Handbook 2008. London: Butterworths. ISBN 978-0-7545-3318-4.
- Health and Safety Executive (2003). COSHH essentials: Easy steps to control chemicals. Control of Substances Hazardous to Health Regulations (HSG193) (2nd ed.). London: HSE books. ISBN 0-7176-2737-3. Archived from the original on 11 August 2020.
- Health and Safety Executive (2005a). "COSHH: A brief guide to the Regulations" (PDF).
- Health and Safety Executive (2005b). Control of Substances Hazardous to Health: Approved Code of Practice and Guidance (5th ed.). London: HSE Books. ISBN 0-7176-2981-3.
- Office of Public Sector Information (2002). "Control of Substances Hazardous to Health Regulations 2002 - Explanatory Note".
- Stranks, J. (2005). Health and Safety Law (5th ed.). London: Prentice Hall. p. p.164. ISBN 0-13-197646-X.
