= Energy For Opportunity =

Non-profit organization

Energy For Opportunity (EFO)
- Founded: 2009
- Founder: Simon Willans, Paul Munro
- Type: International Development Charity
- Purpose: Solar Energy
- Location: 26 Aggienold St, Makama, Makeni, Sierra Leone
- Region served: West Africa
- Key people: Simon Willans, Paul Munro
- Website: http://www.energyforopportunity.org

Energy For Opportunity (EFO) is a non-profit organization dedicated to the promotion of solar energy across the West African Region. They provide solar energy to off-grid families, schools, organizations, and communities in Sierra Leone, Benin, and Mali.

== History ==
Energy For Opportunity's two founders, Simon Willans and Paul Munro, first met while living and working with community-based organizations in rural Uganda. This initial collaboration led to further opportunities in Sierra Leone and Liberia, where they helped to implement a large-scale solar electricity installation project in twelve schools and health clinics in refugee affected areas across Liberia.

Rob Munro, who has worked in post-catastrophe relief, has served as EFO's Chief Information Officer since its inception.

Energy For Opportunity was registered as a charity in Canada on September 21, 2009.

EFO has also twice been a prize winner of the Africa Rural Connect competition run by the National Peace Corps Association.

EFO's work with Solar Powered Community Charging Stations was presented at the 56th Annual International Council for Small Business (ICSB) World conference in Sweden.

== Objective ==
"Focusing on the key areas of health, education, livelihoods and skills training, Energy For Opportunity with the strategic implementation of solar installation projects, seeks to make a difference in the daily lives of communities in the region. EFO's strategy is to develop innovative ways in which to both promote and implement the use of renewable energy. The emphasis therefore is not only on direct solar installation projects (in health clinics, schools, community centers, etc.), but also on solar training for students in partnership with local education institutions and the active promotion of the use of renewable energies in the offices and projects of government bodies and international organizations. Thus the objective is not just to deliver renewable electricity through projects, but also instill a philosophy of renewable energy use across the broader community."

== Areas of operation ==
EFO works with local partners in Sierra Leone, and Ghana. It focuses its work in Schools, Health Clinics and Community Charging Stations. It also teaches photovoltaic classes at a local technical institute.

== Partnerships ==
Princeton University - Students from Princeton University's International Internship Program (starting in 2010) will be conducting research and work that contributes to EFO's overall program and objectives. Specifically, the Princeton interns will be involved in carrying out socio-economic research in EFO's target regions, monitoring and evaluating previous EFO projects or designing specific solar power systems to be tested in the field.

Inveneo - an American non-profit organization whose focus is on information and communication technologies, developed to support communities in lesser developed countries, primarily in Africa.
