= Institute for Occupational Safety and Health of the German Social Accident Insurance =

German institute

The Institute for Occupational Safety and Health of the German Social Accident Insurance (German: Institut für Arbeitsschutz der Deutschen Gesetzlichen Unfallversicherung, IFA) is a German institute located in Sankt Augustin near Bonn and is a main department of the German Social Accident Insurance. Belonging to the Statutory Accident Insurance means that IFA is a non-profit institution.

== Tasks ==
The IFA supports the German institutions for social accident insurance and their organisations in solving scientific and technical problems relating to occupational safety and health. The missions of IFA contain the following objectives:

- research, development and investigations
- testing of products and material samples
- workplace measurements and advice
- participation in standardisation and regulation setting bodies
- technical information and expertise
- testing and certification of products and quality management systems for producers and companies. The certified products and manufacturers can be found in the certificate database

The IFA provides international proficiency testing (PT) schemes for laboratories and measuring stations.

The IFA works closely with 23 international OSH institutes and is member of PEROSH, a European research federation.

The director of the IFA is member of the Zero Accident Forum.

== Fields of activity of the IFA ==
- Chemical/biological hazards (dusts, gases, vapours)
  - Analysis of metals and selected inorganic pollutants
  - Analysis of organic and inorganic pollutants (Liquid chromatography)
  - Analysis of organic pollutants (Gas chromatography)
  - Biological agents
  - Dust - Fibres
  - Emission of hazardous substances
  - Exposure assessment
  - Exposure database (MEGA)
  - Measuring system exposure assessment of the German Social Accident Insurance Institutions (MGU)
  - Personal protective equipment (PPE) against chemical/biological hazards
  - Protective measures
  - Substance- and product-related data (GESTIS, e.g. GESTIS Substance Database, ISi, GESTIS-Stoffenmanager)
  - Techniques for measurement of vapours and gases
  - Techniques for particle measurement
  - Toxicology of industrial chemicals
  - Dust explosions
- Physical hazards
  - Database on physical exposure
  - Hand-arm vibration
  - Hot/cold surfaces
  - Noise measurement
  - Noise protection/Hearing protection
  - PPE against physical hazards
  - Radiation
  - Whole body vibration
- Ergonomics
  - Ergonomic methods and processes for recording and evaluating work-induced load on the musculo-skeletal system
  - Conducting measurements using the CUELA system. CUELA is a personal measurement system employing modern sensor technology to be worn on the work clothing. The associated software interprets the measured data automatically in accordance with ergonomic criteria and helps to implement prevention measures.
  - Ergonomic design of human-machine interfaces
  - Planning and setting up exposure databases on physical loads
  - Ergonomic aspects of head-mounted displays and smart glasses
  - Risk assessment of exoskeletons
  - Studies into the promotion of physical activity by means of dynamic office workplaces
- Epidemiology
- Accident prevention/Product safety
  - Fluid power
  - Material science and tools
  - Protective devices and control systems
  - Safety of machines and installations
  - Structural engineering/Constructional elements
  - Transport and traffic
  - Collaborative robots (COBOTS)
  - Virtual reality in human-system interaction
  - Industrial security
  - Trustworthy artificial intelligence
- Interdisciplinary services
  - Basic and further training
  - Co-operations
  - Information management
  - Information technology
  - Media contact
  - Risk assessment

== Publications ==
Publications referring the work results of IFA can be found in a database.

The IFA is editor of Databases on hazardous substances (GESTIS): GESTIS Substance Database offers information to about 8,800 substances and is free of charge. A mobile version suitable for smartphones and tablets is also available. The GESTIS Biological Agents Database contains information for safe handling of biological agents at the workplace. GESTIS-Stoffenmanager® is an online tool for risk assessment during activities with hazardous substances. GESTIS-DUST-EX is a database on combustion and explosion characteristics of dusts. GESTIS also offers a database with a collection of international occupational limit values for hazardous substances, additionally available as a mobile app. IFA’s exposure database MEGA provides data on hazardous chemicals gathered through atmospheric measurements and material analyses since 1972. It is determined to support the institutions for statutory accident insurance and prevention with epidemiological issues or retrospective considerations related to occupational diseases.

== History ==
The precursor institute of the IFA – dedicated to dust abatement - was founded in 1935 and reestablished in 1953. In 1976 the institute for noise abatement in Mainz was included. In 1980 the institute – then named BIA – moved to Sankt Augustin near Bonn. In 2003 the name changed to BGIA and in 2007 the institute obtained its present-day name on occasion of the fusion of the German social accident insurance institutions in the commercial and the public sector. Since the beginning of 2010 the abbreviated designation is IFA.
