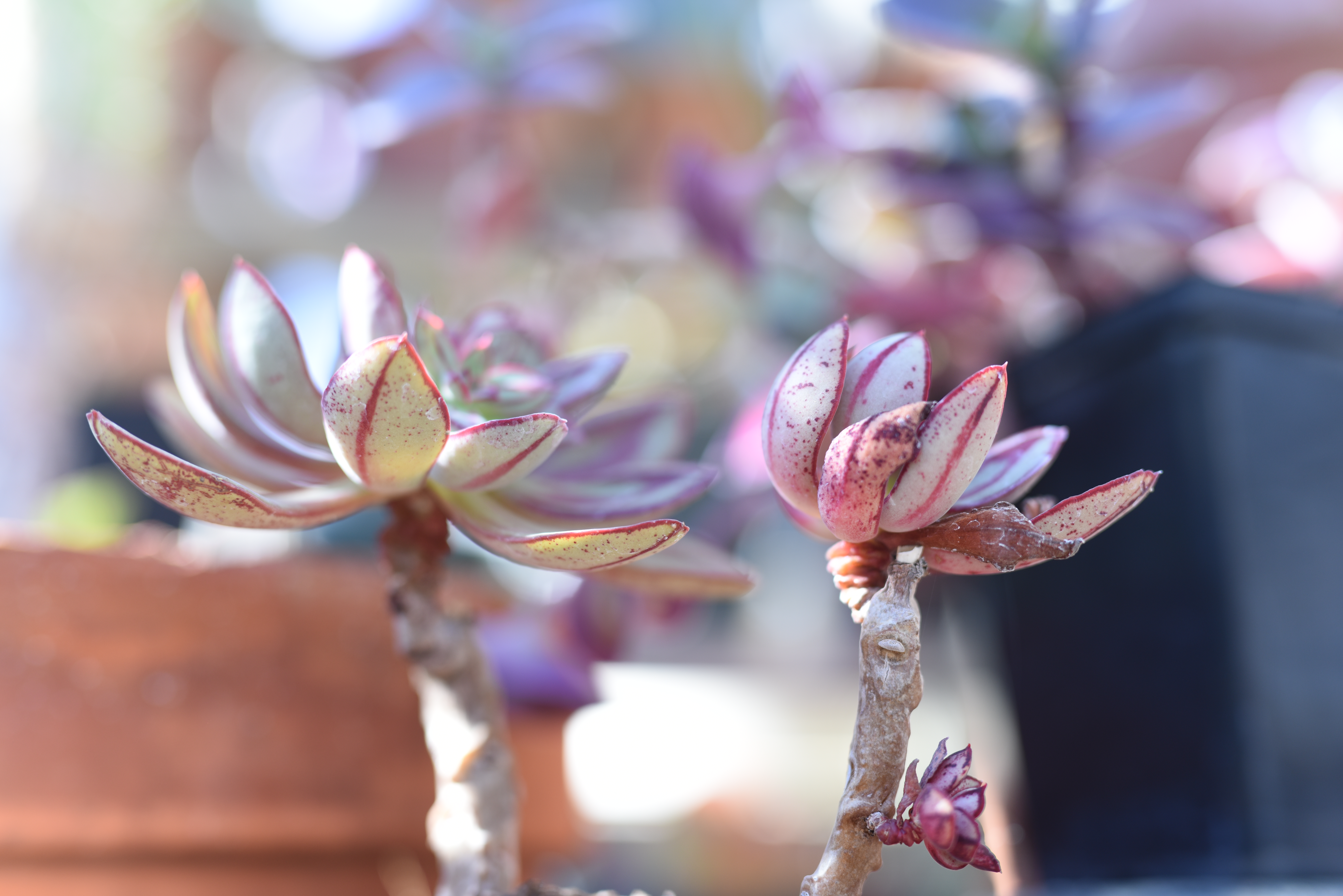

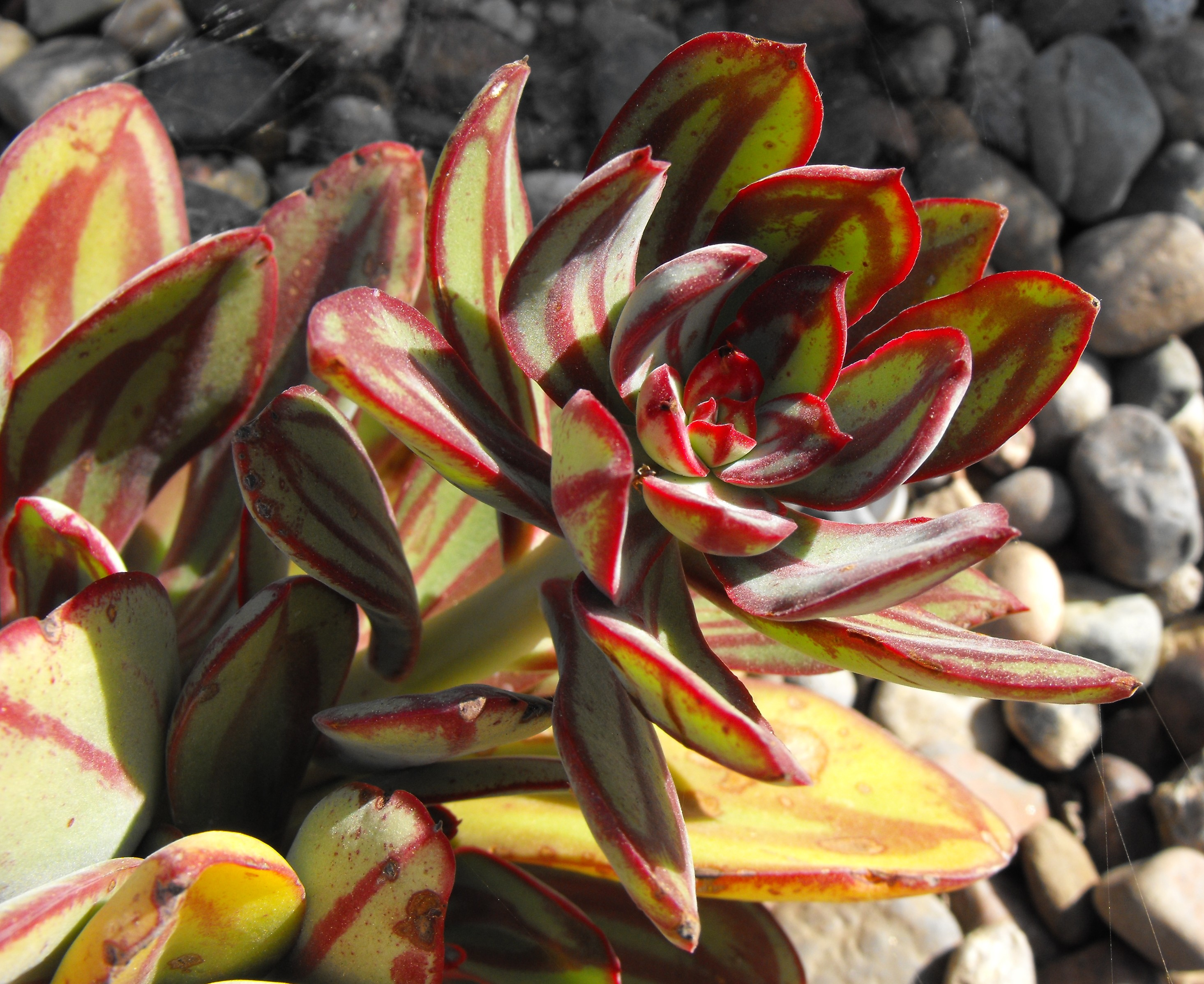
- At Cuyamaca College, San Diego, California.

Scientific classification
- Kingdom: Plantae
- Clade: Tracheophytes
- Clade: Angiosperms
- Clade: Eudicots
- Order: Saxifragales
- Family: Crassulaceae
- Genus: Echeveria
- Species: E. nodulosa

Binomial name
- Echeveria nodulosa (Baker) Ed.Otto

Synonyms
- Cotyledon nodulosa Baker; Echeveria discolor De Smet ex É.Morren; Echeveria misteca De Smet ex É.Morren; Echeveria nodulosa var. minor E.Walther; Echeveria sturmiana Poelln.

= Echeveria nodulosa =

Species of plant

Echeveria nodulosa, the 'painted echeveria', is a species of succulent flowering plant in the Crassulaceae (stonecrop) family. Fairly popular in cultivation, it is native to Mexico, where it is widely-distributed, and rather common, in northern Oaxaca and southern Puebla. It is known for its striped, purplish leaves, its "knobby" stems (hence the name nodulosa), and its seasonal display of flowers.

They are relatively disease-free, but, like all succulents, may attract scale insects or mealybugs, which are drawn to the tight crevices and folds between the leaves. If remedied early on, these insects pose no threat to a plant's longevity, though larger, long-term infestations can drain a plant of its vigor and result in death. When in-bloom, the flower buds can sometimes attract aphids, which may be difficult to see as they often resemble water droplets on the blossoms. Introducing ladybugs may help to counteract aphids, as they are known to readily consume them, especially in the ladybug's larval stages.

Pests are easily washed-off with a gentle spray of water or removed by hand, or sprayed with diluted rubbing or isopropyl alcohol, preferably during the early evening; wet leaves exposed to sunlight can cause leaf burn (especially with rubbing alcohol or other chemicals). Additionally, store-bought products, such as horticultural oil or insecticidal soap, or neem oil, are effective.

== Taxonomy ==
Echeveria is named for Atanasio Echeverría y Godoy, a botanical illustrator who contributed to Flora Mexicana.

Nodulosa means 'with swellings', or 'bearing nodules', and is typically given in reference to the presence of root nodules. Echeveria nodulosa, when compared with other varieties of Echeveria, displays noticeably more "raised" leaf/root nodes along its stems.
