= Scientific Committee on Occupational Exposure Limit Values =

The Scientific Committee on Occupational Exposure Limit Values (SCOEL) is a committee of the European Commission established in 1995 to advise on occupational exposure limits for chemicals in the workplace within the framework of:

- Directive 98/24/EC, the chemical agents directive; and
- Directive 90/394/EEC, the carcinogens at work directive.

It is composed of scientists who are expert in chemistry, toxicology, epidemiology, occupational medicine or industrial hygiene, and reviews available information, recommending exposure limits where possible.
