= Occupational exposure limit =

Upper limit on the acceptable concentration of a hazardous substance

An occupational exposure limit is an upper limit on the acceptable concentration of a hazardous substance in workplace air for a particular material or class of materials. It is typically set by competent national authorities and enforced by legislation to protect occupational safety and health. It is an important tool in risk assessment and in the management of activities involving handling of dangerous substances. There are many dangerous substances for which there are no formal occupational exposure limits. In these cases, hazard banding or control banding strategies can be used to ensure safe handling.

== Background ==
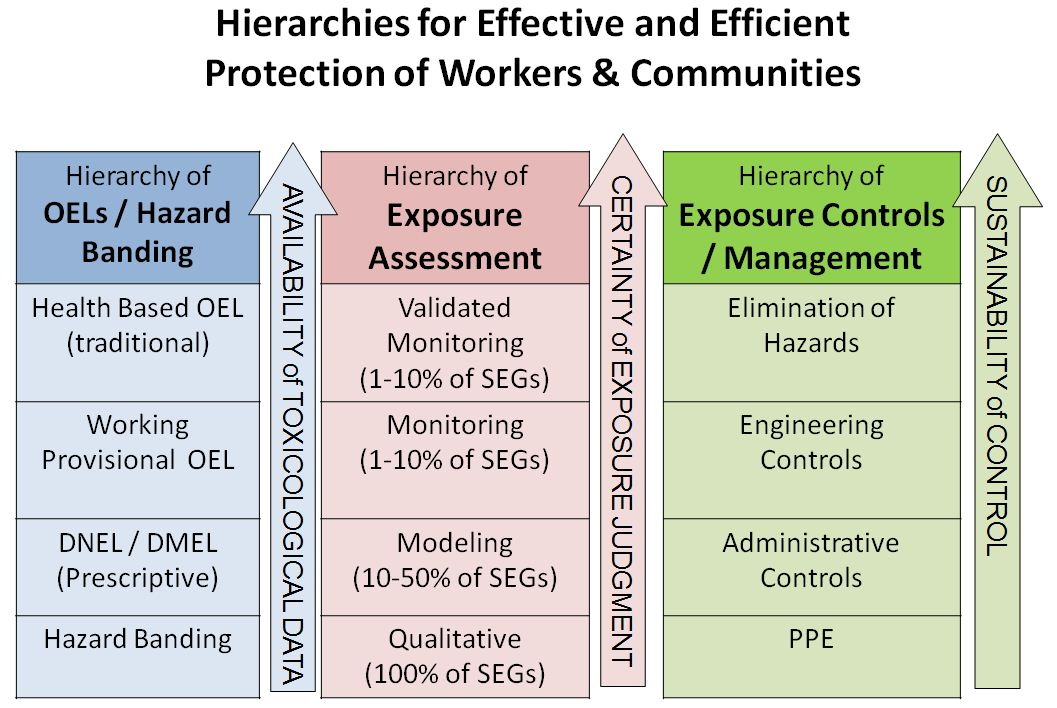
Simple representation of exposure risk assessment and management hierarchy based on available information

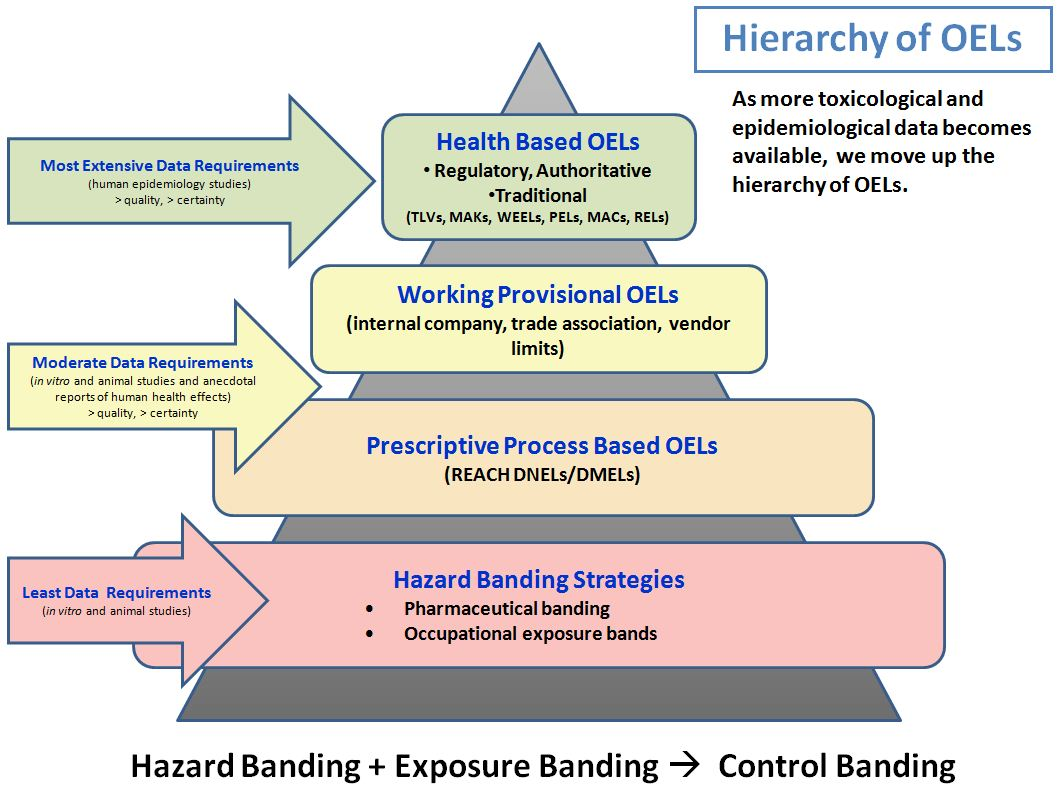
Hierarchy of occupational exposure limits (OELs)

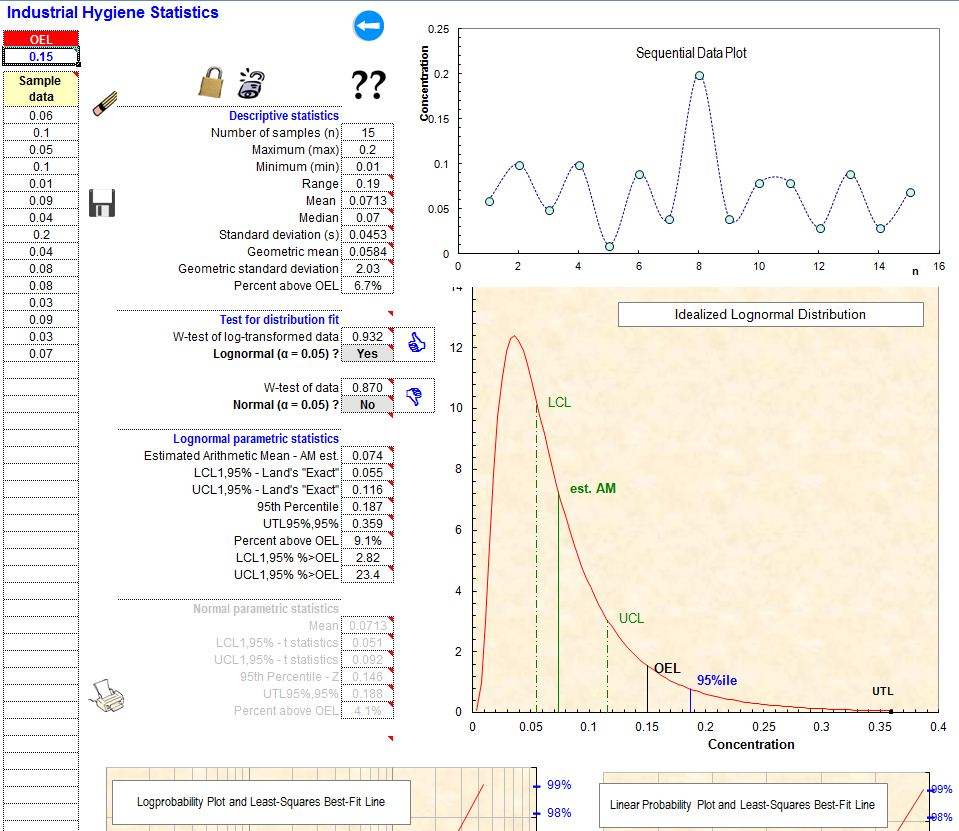
Illustration of statistical output from IHSTAT using air sampling data

Personal air sampling is routinely conducted on workers to determine whether exposures are acceptable or unacceptable. These samples are collected and analyzed using validated sampling and analytical methods. These methods are available from OSHA Technical Manual and NIOSH Manual of Analytical Methods. Statistical tools are available to assess exposure monitoring data against OELs. The statistical tools are typically free but do require some previous knowledge with statistical concepts. A popular exposure data statistical tool called IHSTAT is available from AIHA (American Industrial Hygiene Association). IH STAT has 14 languages including English and is available for free.

Methods for performing occupational exposure assessments can be found in the book A Strategy for Assessing and Managing Occupational Exposures, Third Edition, edited by Joselito S. Ignacio and William H. Bullock.

With the World Health Organization and the International Labour Office having now quantified the global burden of disease from psychosocial occupational hazards, identification of OELs for such hazards is increasingly becoming a focus of attention for occupational safety and health policy and practice.

== Types ==
- Permissible exposure limit, set by the U.S. Occupational Safety and Health Administration
- Recommended exposure limit, set by the U.S. National Institute for Occupational Safety and Health
- Indicative limit value, set by the European Union
- Threshold limit value, set by the American Conference of Governmental Industrial Hygienists
- Occupational exposure banding, a process that can be used when not enough data are available to determine quantitative exposure limits

== International limit values ==
The database "GESTIS - International limit values for chemical agents" contains a collection of occupational limit values for hazardous substances collected from 35 lists from 29 countries: various EU member states, Australia, Canada, Israel, Japan, New Zealand, Singapore, South Korea, Switzerland, China, Turkey, and the United States. The database comprises values of more than 2,000 substances.

The present database was elaborated in co-operation with experts from various international occupational safety and health institutions. It aims to give an overview of limit values in different countries. Since the limit values vary in their handling, the level of protection, and their legal relevance, the original lists of limit values and the explanations there should be considered as primary sources. Also the chemical nomenclature is diverging, synonyms can for example be found in the GESTIS Substance Database.

The database is also available as an app for mobile terminals with Android or iOS operating systems.

== See also ==
- Short-term exposure limit
- Acceptable daily intake – Measure of a substance in food or water
- Tolerable daily intake – Amount of a chemical contaminant that is safe
- No-observed-adverse-effect level – Exposure level measure used in drug studies
- Lowest-observed-adverse-effect level
- Reference dose – Maximum acceptable oral dose of a toxic substance in the US
- Exposure action value
- Occupational hygiene – Management of workplace health hazards
- PIMEX A method to make invisible hazards in the work environment visible and thus facilitate the reduction of hazards and risks in workplaces
