= PIMEX =

PIMEX is one of the so-called video exposure monitoring methods which are used in occupational hygiene practise since their introduction in the mid-1980s. The name PIMEX is an acronym from the words PIcture Mix EXposure, and implies that the method is based on mixing pictures, in this case from a video camera, with data on a worker’s exposure to some agent. The main idea of the method is to make invisible hazards in the work environment visible and in this manner facilitate the reduction of hazards in workplaces.

== Invention ==
The method PIMEX was originally developed in Sweden during the 1980s by Gunnar Rosén and Ing-Marie Andersson. Similar technique was developed also in USA where NIOSH researchers described a technique using a video overlay board and computer program to display, in real-time or after recording of data and video on tape, the measured value as a bar graph and the picture on the computer screen.

Video exposure monitoring has thereafter been further developed and used in a number of countries.

The workers’ knowledge of risks associated with their tasks and, perhaps more importantly, how these risks can be controlled, is essential to improve their health. Applications of the PIMEX methods are various, focusing on work task analysis, training and risk communication, encouraging worker participation in and motivation for improvements in the workplace environment.

== Use ==
PIMEX is used in many different countries. It is a widely used in the Netherlands for risk communication in the field of chemical exposure and it has been proven to be a very strong communication tool. There are more than 100 professional videos made with PIMEx for many different industries. They are all free available. The Dutch Ministry of social affairs developed a new promo video of PIMEX. It demonstrates the function and use of PIMEX with various examples from working environments.

There are a number of situations where PIMEX has been used:

- To train workers to use PPE and control measurements in the right way;
- To enlarge the knowledge of chemical risks and to motivate workers of management to use safe working procedures or to take measures;
- Workplace analyses (hazard identification);
- Visualization of a good practice method

In the Netherlands, the method is available to small and medium enterprises by the use of a half day workplace analysis or simple videos can be made.

PIMEX is also used to visualize noise, heat stress, nanoparticles, electromagnetic fields and physical load. In the Netherlands there are also videos available that are made for employees in health services who are working with a mobile patient hoist. Such mobile hoists are used to reduce physical overload. The video shows the difference in exposure between using the hoist in the wrong and the correct way, for example when the wheels are in the wrong or right position.
