= Occupational exposure banding =

Categorization process for chemical hazards

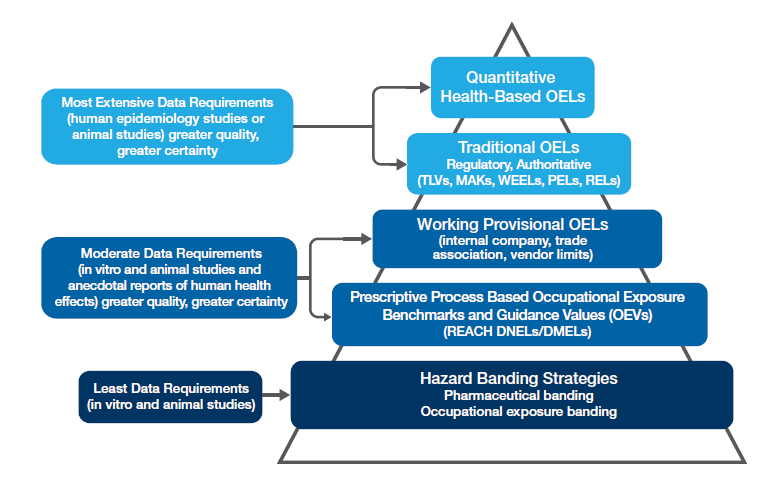
The Hierarchy of Occupational Exposure Limits, of which occupational exposure banding is a member

Occupational exposure banding, also known as hazard banding, is a process intended to quickly and accurately assign chemicals into specific categories (bands), each corresponding to a range of exposure concentrations designed to protect worker health. These bands are assigned based on a chemical’s toxicological potency and the adverse health effects associated with exposure to the chemical. The output of this process is an occupational exposure band (OEB). Occupational exposure banding has been used by the pharmaceutical sector and by some major chemical companies over the past several decades to establish exposure control limits or ranges for new or existing chemicals that do not have formal OELs. Furthermore, occupational exposure banding has become an important component of the Hierarchy of Occupational Exposure Limits (OELs).

The U.S. National Institute for Occupational Safety and Health (NIOSH) has developed a process that could be used to apply occupational exposure banding to a broader spectrum of occupational settings. The NIOSH occupational exposure banding process utilizes available, but often limited, toxicological data to determine a potential range of chemical exposure levels that can be used as targets for exposure controls to reduce risk among workers. An OEB is not meant to replace an OEL, rather it serves as a starting point to inform risk management decisions. Therefore, the OEB process should not be applied to a chemical with an existing OEL.

== Purpose ==
A video on occupational exposure banding methodology

Occupational exposure limits (OELs) play a critical role in protecting workers from exposure to dangerous concentrations of hazardous material. In the absence of an OEL, determining the controls needed to protect workers from chemical exposures can be challenging. According to the U.S. Environmental Protection Agency, the Toxic Substances Control Act Chemical Substance Inventory as of 2014 contained over 85,000 chemicals that are commercially available, but a quantitative health-based OEL has been developed for only about 1,000 of these chemicals. Furthermore, the rate at which new chemicals are being introduced into commerce significantly outpaces OEL development, creating a need for guidance on thousands of chemicals that lack reliable exposure limits.

The NIOSH occupational exposure banding process has been created to provide a reliable approximation of a safe exposure level for potentially hazardous and unregulated chemicals in the workplace. Occupational exposure banding uses limited chemical toxicity data to group chemicals into one of five bands.

Occupational exposure bands:

- Define a set range of exposures expected to protect worker health
- Identify potential health effects and target organs with 9 toxicological endpoints
- Provide critical information on chemical potency
- Inform decisions on control methods, hazard communication, and medical surveillance
- Identify areas where health effects data is lacking
- Require less time and data than developing an OEL

== Assignment process ==
The NIOSH occupational exposure banding process utilizes a three-tiered approach. Each tier of the process has different requirements for data sufficiency, which allows stakeholders to use the occupational exposure banding process in many different situations. Selection of the most appropriate tier for a specific banding situation depends on the quantity and quality of the available data and the training and expertise of the user.

The process places chemicals into one of five bands, designated A through E. Each band is associated with a specific range of exposure concentrations. Band E represents the lowest range of exposure concentrations, while Band A represents the highest range. Assignment of a chemical to a band is based on both the potency of the chemical and the severity of the health effect. Band A and band B include chemicals with reversible health effects or produce adverse effects at only high concentration levels. Band C, band D, or band E include chemicals with serious or irreversible effects and those that cause problems at low concentration ranges. The resulting airborne concentration target ranges are shown in the graphic:

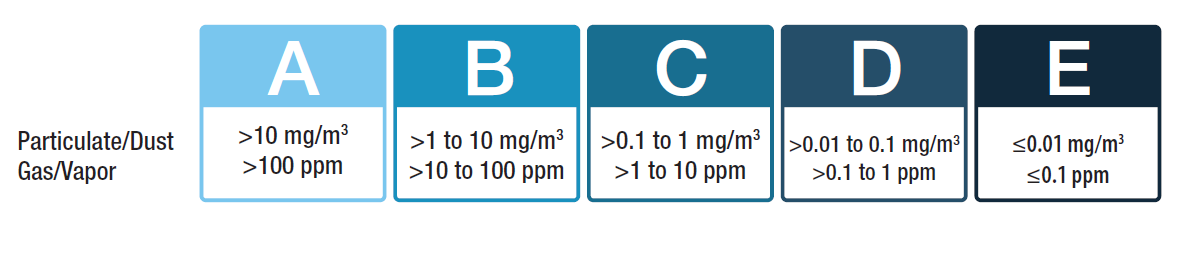
Each of the five occupational exposure bands (OEBs) define a range of exposures expected to protect worker health. Band A has the highest exposure range for the least severe hazards, while band E has the lowest exposure range.

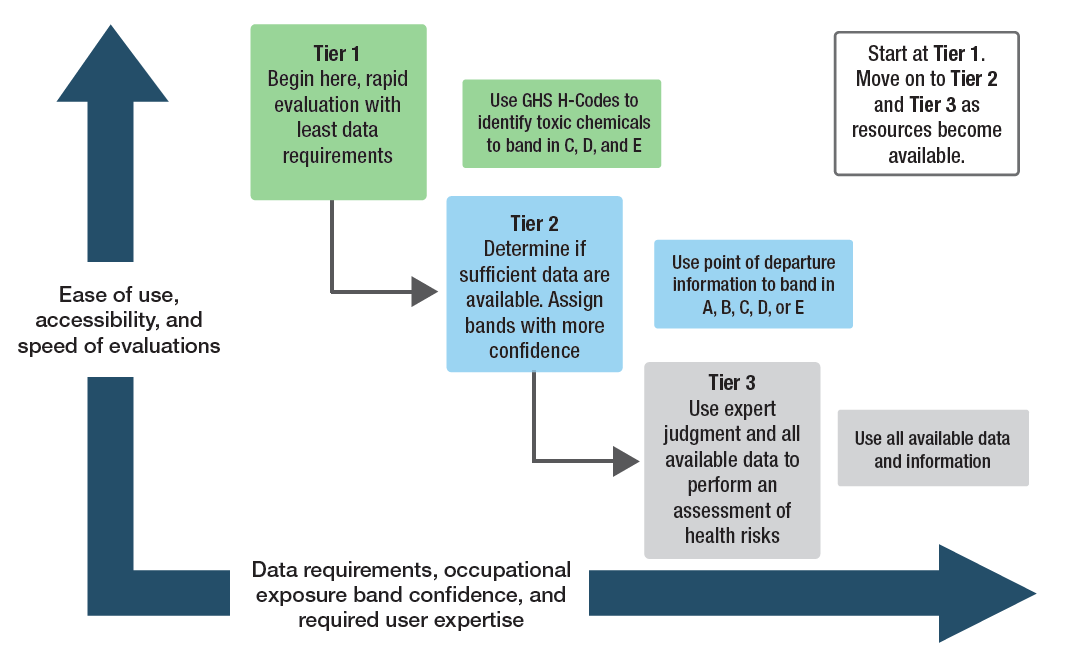
The three tiers of the NIOSH occupational exposure banding process

Tier 1, the qualitative tier, produces an occupational exposure band (OEB) assignment based on qualitative data from the Globally Harmonized System of Classification and Labeling of Chemicals (GHS); it involves assigning the OEB based on criteria aligned with specific GHS hazard codes and categories. These hazard codes are typically pulled from GESTIS, ECHA Annex VI, or safety data sheets. The Tier 1 process can be performed by a health and safety generalist, and takes only minutes to complete with the NIOSH OEB e-tool. The e-tool is free to use and can be accessed through the NIOSH website.

Tier 2, the semi-quantitative tier, produces an OEB assignment based on quantitative and qualitative data from secondary sources; it involves assigning the OEB on the basis of key findings from prescribed literature sources, including use of data from specific types of studies. Tier 2 focuses on nine toxicological endpoints. The Tier 2 process can be performed by an occupational hygienist but requires some formal training. Tier 2 banding is also incorporated into the NIOSH OEB e-tool but can take hours instead of minutes to complete for a given chemical. However, the resulting band is considered more robust than a Tier 1 band due to the in-depth retrieval of published data. NIOSH recommends users complete at least the Tier 2 process to produce reliable OEBs.

Tier 3, the expert judgement tier, relies on expert judgement to produce a band based on primary and secondary data that is available to the user. This level of OEB would require the advanced knowledge and experience held by a toxicologist or veteran occupational hygienist. The Tier 3 process allows the professional to incorporate their own raw data in conjunction with the availability of data drawn from published literature.

== Reliability ==
Since unveiling the occupational exposure banding technique in 2017, NIOSH has sought feedback from its users and has evaluated the reliability of this tool. There has been an overwhelming response of positive feedback. Users have described Tier 1 as a helpful screening tool, Tier 2 as a basic assessment for a new chemical on the worksite, and Tier 3 as a personalized in-depth analysis. During pilot testing, NIOSH evaluated the Tier 1 and Tier 2 protocols using chemicals with OELs and compared the banding results to OELs. For >90% of these chemicals, the resultant Tier 1 and Tier 2 bands were found to be equally or more stringent than the OELs. This demonstrates the confidence health & safety professionals can have in the OEB process when making risk management decisions for chemicals without OELs.

== Limitations ==
Although occupational exposure banding holds a great deal of promise for the occupational hygiene profession, there are potential limitations that should be considered. As with any analysis, the outcome of the NIOSH occupational exposure banding process – the OEB – is dependent upon the quantity and the quality of data used and the expertise of the individual using the process. In order to maximize data quality, NIOSH has compiled a list of NIOSH-recommended sources which can provide data that can be used for banding. Furthermore, for some chemicals the amount of quality data may not be sufficient to derive an OEB. The lack of data does not indicate that the chemical is safe. Other risk management strategies, such as control banding, can then be applied.

== Control banding versus exposure banding ==
The NIOSH occupational exposure banding process guides a user through the evaluation and selection of critical health hazard information to select an OEB from among five categories of severity. For OEBs, the process uses only hazard-based data (e.g., studies on human health effects or toxicology studies) to identify an overall level of hazard potential and associated airborne concentration range for chemicals with similar hazard profiles. While the output of this process can be used by informed occupational safety and health professionals to make risk management and exposure control decisions, the process does not supply such recommendations directly.

In contrast, control banding is a strategy that groups workplace risks into control categories or bands based on combinations of both hazard and exposure information. Control banding combines hazard banding with exposure risk management to directly link hazards to specific control measures. Various toolkit models for control banding have been developed in the UK, Germany, and the Netherlands. COSHH Essentials was the first widely adopted banding scheme. Other banding schemes are also available, such as Stoffenmanager, EMKG, and International Chemical Control Toolkit of the ILO. Evaluation of these and other control banding systems have yielded varying results. Occupational exposure banding has emerged as a helpful supplementary exposure assessment tool.

When conducting a workplace hazard assessment, occupational hygienists may find it useful to start with occupational exposure banding to identify potential hazards and exposure ranges, before moving on to control banding. Together, these tools will aid the health & safety professional in selecting the appropriate risk mitigation strategies.

== Application in pharmaceutical manufacturing ==
The pharmaceutical industry was an early adopter of occupational exposure banding, using it to group active pharmaceutical ingredients (APIs) by toxicological potency and hazard in order to guide the selection of engineering controls, personal protective equipment, exposure monitoring, and handling procedures for substances that do not have an established occupational exposure limit (OEL).

Pharmaceutical banding systems are often labelled OEB 1 through OEB 5, but the number of bands, the naming conventions, and the associated airborne concentration ranges vary between individual company schemes and industry frameworks, and are not standardised. In these schemes higher bands generally correspond to more potent or more hazardous substances, which are assigned lower airborne exposure targets and more stringent containment; this numbering runs in the opposite direction to the A–E designations used in the NIOSH process, illustrating that banding labels are scheme-specific and are not directly interchangeable.

For highly potent active pharmaceutical ingredients (HPAPIs), the assigned band can inform the design and operation of containment measures such as isolators, contained transfer and split-valve systems, local exhaust ventilation, single-use containment, and dedicated or pressure-controlled processing areas. As with the NIOSH process generally, an occupational exposure band is not a substitute for a formal OEL; it provides a risk-management starting point when an OEL has not been established or when toxicological data are limited.

== See also ==
- Control banding – Approach to promoting OHS
- Health Hazards Evaluation Program, NIOSH
- Occupational exposure limit – Upper limit on the acceptable concentration of a hazardous substance
- Recommended exposure limit – Limit for exposure to a chemical substance
- Threshold limit value – Hazardous substance exposure threshold
- Hierarchy of hazard controls – System used in industry to eliminate or minimize exposure to hazards
- Occupational hygiene – Management of workplace health hazards
