= Horticultural oil =

Insecticide spray oil

Horticultural oils are refined petroleum fractions (mineral oils) widely used as insecticides. They are used against various insects (aphids, mites, beetle larvae, leaf miners, thrips, leafhopper, whitefly, scale) on fruit, vegetable and other crops, as well as against powdery mildew. They are approved for use in organic farming under the U.S. National Organic Program.

== Mode of action ==
Mineral oils were long believed to act by blocking the spiracles of the insect and thus causing suffocation. However recently several additional effects were described. IRAC categorises mineral oil in group UNM (non-specific mechanical and physical disruptors). Resistance to mineral oil has never been observed.

== Manufacture and purity ==
Horticultural oils are prepared from crude petroleum fractions by distillation and various chemical processes. This removes or hydrogenates the unsaturated (alkene and aromatic) molecules, which cause plant damage (phytotoxicity), and delivers the C20-C25 fractions, which are the most effective insecticides. Mineral oils have been used since the 19th century, but the grades used then were cruder, and they could not be used for all applications due to phytotoxicity. The grades of oil are given by the amount of unsaturated components (unsulfonated residues UR), by the distillation temperature (°C), by the viscosity (SUS), and by the carbon number (nCy). Vegetable oils have been shown to kill insects, but they are more phytotoxic than mineral oils.

== Usage and market size ==
Global marked data is not available, but reliable data is provided by the state of California. Mineral oil is the most used insecticide, both in acreage and in volume. 34,508,857 pounds (15,652,972 kg) of mineral oil was sprayed on 4,543,066 acres (about 1.8 million hectares).

1 to 4% solutions in water are sprayed, which is hundreds of times more than modern synthetic insecticides. Mineral oil is correspondingly cheaper.

== Synonyms, grades and types ==
There are many synonyms used for horticultural oil. Often they are not fully synonymous but refer to different grades of oil.

The following names can be found: petroleum distillates, refined petroleum distillates, spray oils, petroleum derived spray oils or PDSOs, petroleum spray oils or PSOs, hydrocarbon oils, lubricating oils, narrow-range oils, white mineral oils, aliphatic solvents, paraffin oils, paraffinic oils, mineral oils, horticultural oils, agricultural oils, supreme oil, Volck oils, dormant oils, foliage or foliar oils, or summer oils. superior oils.

Dormant oil is used on woody plants during the dormant season. Originally used cruder oils were used, but the term now refers to the time of application. Summer oil or foliar oil refers to its use on plants when foliage is present, for which cruder grades could not be used.

The US EPA recognises hundreds of grades of mineral oil. White oils are the most refined and most consistent of the mineral oils, and are approved for pharmaceutical or food use.

== Mammalian and environmental toxicity ==
Mineral oil has low acute and sub-acute toxicity in laboratory animals. The US EPA classified aliphatic solvents as Toxicity Category IV (lowest toxicity—regarded as practically non-toxic).

It is non-toxic to pollinators, fish, and birds. It is highly toxic to aquatic invertebrates, but not very mobile in soil.
