= Indicative limit value =

Aspect of hazardous substance law in the European Union

In the law of the European Union, indicative limit values, more exactly indicative occupational exposure limit values (IOELVs), are human exposure limits to hazardous substances specified by the Council of the European Union based on expert research and advice.

They are not binding on member states but must be taken into consideration in setting national occupational exposure limits. Some member states have pre-existing national limits lower than the IOELV and are not required to revise these upwards. In practice, most member states adopt the IOELV but there are some variances upwards and downwards.

== Legal basis ==
A system of IOELVs was first introduced in 1980 by directive 80/1107/EEC but the first list of 27 substances was not created until directive 91/322/EC in 1991. Member states had until 31 December 1993 to implement national limits. This first list was amended by directive 2006/15/EC in 2006 which transferred 10 of the 27 to a different regulatory regime. A second list was defined in directive 96/94/EEC but this was repealed by directive 2000/39/EC.

In 1998, directive 80/1107/EEC was repealed and replaced by a new regime under the chemical agents directive (directive 98/24/EC). The directive defines occupational exposure limit value as "the limit of the time-weighted average of the concentration of a chemical agent in the air within the breathing zone of a worker over a specified reference period." Article 3 of the directive led to the creation of the Scientific Committee on Occupational Exposure Limit Values to advise the European Commission. There have subsequently been two directives establishing further lists of IOELVs: 2000/39/EC and 2006/15/EC. As of 2008, the IOELVs under directive 91/322/EC remain in force but under review. A third list of IOELVs, now under directive 98/24/EC, is expected in the first half of 2008.

== Bibliography ==
- Dikshith, T. S. S.; Diwan, P. V. (2003). Industrial Guide to Chemical and Drug Safety. Wiley-IEEE. pp. pp189–191. ISBN 0471236985. (Google Books)
- European Commission. "Occupational Exposure Limits and Biological Limit Values". Health and Safety at Work. Employment and Social Affairs. Archived from the original on 2008-04-16.
- European Commission. "Unofficial consolidated list of the IOEVLs". Employment and Social Affairs.
- Walters, D.; Grodzki, K. (2006). Beyond Limits? Dealing with Chemical Risks at Work in Europe. Emerald Group Publishing. ISBN 0080448585. (Google Books)
