= Africa Rural Connect =

Peace Corps program

Africa Rural Connect (ARC) was a program of the National Peace Corps Association. The website was launched on July 15, 2009 as an online collaboration tool for users to share and build upon ideas to solve some of the challenges facing rural African communities. It is now defunct. The ARC community featured ideas and insight from returned and current U.S. Peace Corps Volunteers, members of the African Diaspora, development professionals, and academic scholars. ARC also encouraged input from anyone who may have an interests or skill-sets that coincide with the ideas posted on the site. ARC also held a competition, offering funding to implement the best projects on the site. The second Africa Rural Connect Competition launched on March 15, 2010 and ran until November 15, 2010.

== Technology ==
Africa Rural Connect ran on the Wegora platform. Like other, similar platforms, Wegora allows each user to post their idea onto the website and to receive encouragement and advice in the form of comments on their idea page. However, Wegora also includes unique features, such as the ability of users to create improved versions of each other's ideas, clearly displaying how collaboration can transform a small idea into a full-out project plan. Also, users can "endorse" any idea in order to show their support of the suggested initiative.

== Ideas ==
The site featured ideas that aimed to improve rural communities in Africa. There were four primary categories in which most ideas fall into: Agribusiness, Communication, Post-Harvest Losses, and Water Resources. Posts can range from one sentence ideas that prompt the creation of more detailed projects, to comprehensive business plans from established organizations.

== Competition ==
=== 2009 ===
The ARC competition opened on July 15, 2009, when the site launched, and closed on November 15, 2009. There were 4 month-long preliminary rounds in the competition. The top 3 ideas in each round received seed funding to implement their plans, first place received $3,000, second place received $2,000, and 3rd place received $1,000. At the close of the fourth round, ARC judges deliberated over the ideas, selecting the final winner in December 2009. The grand prize winner received $20,000 of project seed funds.

| | Round 1 | Round 2 | Round 3 | Round 4 |
|---|---|---|---|---|
| First place | Zittnet- harnessing information to make rural markets work better | Self-Supported Ghanaian Subsistence Farmers Consortiums | Electronic Agriculture in Kenya's Arid and Semi–Arid Lands (ASAL) Schools | The Ndekero Challenge: A Systems Approach to Rabbit Keeping... |
| Second place | Create a Solar Powered Energy Revolution across West Africa | The Acceleration of Innovation | Dehydration of Vegetable Products | Bamboo Lota: The Dream for a Sustainable Malawi |
| 3rd place | Soymilk Production Expansion | Project Irrigation Initiative- Region Kedougou, Senegal | Irrigation is the Key for Africa to Take on Drought | Rainwater Harvesting in Rural Tanzania |

Grand Prize Winner
The Ndekero Challenge: A Systems Approach to Rabbit Keeping by a Rural Community in Partnership with a Commercial Rabbit Farm

=== 2010 ===
The newest ARC competition launched on March 15, 2010 and closed on November 15, 2010. This time there was four two-month-long rounds in the contest. The top 10 ideas in each round became Round Winners. The judges select the 2 best ideas based on how well the plans meet the selection criteria. These 2 winners receive $1,000 each towards implementation. At the end of the fourth and final round, the competition closed and the panel of judges selects one Grand Prize Winner from all of the ideas posted on the site during the four rounds. This Grand Prize Winner was selected by merit-based criteria and received $12,000 towards the implementation of the idea.The Grand Prize Winner was announced in early December.

The First Round ran from March 15- May 15.

The Second Round ran from May 15- July 15.

The Third Round ran from July 15- September 15.

Fourth Round ran from September 15- November 15.

The 2010 Grand Prize winner was announced on December 28, 2010. The $12,000 prize went to a Ugandan Innovator, co-founder and Executive Director of Toro Development Network (ToroDev), Johnstone Baguma Kumaraki. The winner is also partners at Business Incubation Initiative, Uganda.

== Judges ==
=== 2009 ===
Four judges selected the final Grand Prize Winner in December 2009:

- Carol Bellamy, President and CEO, World Learning, former Director of the Peace Corps, and former Executive Director of UNICEF
- Wilber James, manager of Rockport Capital, a leading venture capital firm and director of the African Wildlife Foundation
- Angélique Kidjo, world-renowned Beninoise singer-songwriter and UNICEF goodwill ambassador.
- Bruce McNamer, CEO of TechnoServe

=== 2010 ===
Three judges select 2 prize winners out of the top 10 ideas of each round. They also select the final Grand Prize Winner in December 2010:

- Wilber James, manager of Rockport Capital, a leading venture capital firm and director of the African Wildlife Foundation.
- Mariéme Jamme, CEO, SpotOne Global Solutions.
- Bruce McNamer, CEO of TechnoServe.

== Funding and Support ==
ARC was hosted by the National Peace Corps Association, a non-profit, membership-based alumni organization that serves all returned Peace Corps volunteers and former staff, as well as Peace Corps family, friends, and supporters. The project was supported by a grant from the Bill & Melinda Gates Foundation as part of the foundation's Agricultural Development initiative to provide millions of small-holder farmers in the developing world with tools and opportunities to boost their yields, increase their incomes, and build better lives for themselves and their families.
