= PEROSH =

Science

PEROSH (Partnership for European Research in Occupational Safety and Health) is a federation of fourteen European occupational safety and health (OSH) institutes in thirteen member states. The aim of PEROSH is to share knowledge, conduct collaborative research and organise common conferences on topics related to health and safety at work.

== History ==
The consortium was established in Rome on 7 November 2003 to foster research on important fields in OSH.

In Dublin on 7 November 2008 the articles of association were revised and broadened to facilitate the collaboration within the institutes. The most important regulations imply that each partner institute bears the costs of its activities and that the partnership employs its own Manager International Affairs. He has been representing PEROSH since 2009.

The partnership was renewed and extended in Paris in May 2013.

== Members ==
- Austria (AUVA)
- Denmark (NFA)
- Finland (FIOH)
- France (INRS)
- Germany (BAuA and IFA)
- Italy (INAIL)
- Norway (STAMI)
- Poland (CIOP-PIB)
- Spain (INSST)
- Switzerland (Unisanté)
- United Kingdom (HSE)
- The Netherlands (TNO)
- Since 2020 : Sweden (Swedish Agency for Work Environment Expertise –SAWEE in English and Mynak in Swedish)

== Activities ==
Usually there are up to ten joint research projects with more than 80 researchers involved. These research projects address prevailing OSH topics, e. g.:

- Dose-Response Relationships (DRR) for selected chemical substances
- indirIR-UV – Exposure of workers to indirect IR- and UV-radiation emitted by arcs, flames and thermal radiators
- Wellbeing at work with regular conferences on the topic.
- Nano Exposure and Contextual Information Database (NECID)
- Health Impact Assessment for Occupational Respiratory Diseases

PEROSH carries on research in the field of standardisation, especially the determination of workplace-related safety factors for protective equipment.
