= Control banding =

Approach to promoting OHS

Control banding is a qualitative or semi-quantitative risk assessment and management approach to promoting occupational health and safety. It is intended to minimize worker exposures to hazardous chemicals and other risk factors in the workplace and to help small businesses by providing an easy-to-understand, practical approach to controlling hazardous exposures at work.

The principle of control banding was first applied to dangerous chemicals, chemical mixtures, and fumes. The control banding process emphasizes the controls needed to prevent hazardous substances from causing harm to people at work. The greater the potential for harm, the greater the degree of control needed to manage the situation and make the risk “acceptable.”

Control banding is particularly useful in circumstances where there are not established occupational or environmental exposure limits for a chemical. There are 219 million chemicals with a Chemical Abstracts Service (CAS) Registry Number, and less than 500 are regulated by the United States Occupational Safety and Health Administration (OSHA). Employers have a responsibility to protect their workers from harm regardless of whether a substance-specific standard exists, and control banding serves as a proactive approach to fulfilling this duty.

A single control technology or strategy is matched with a single band, or range of exposures (e.g. 1-10 milligrams per cubic meter) for a particular class of chemicals (e.g. skin irritants, reproductive hazards).

== COSHH ==
In the United Kingdom, the Health and Safety Executive (HSE) has developed a comprehensive control banding model known as Control of Substances Hazardous to Health (COSHH) Essentials.

Below is an example of four control bands developed for inhalation hazards based on this method.

Band no.	Hazard Group	Exposure Concentration	Control Strategy
1	Skin and eye irritants	<1–10 mg/m^{3} dust, or >50 to 500 ppm vapor	General ventilation and good industrial hygiene practices.
2	Harmful on single exposure	>0.1 to 1 mg/m^{3} dust or >5 to 50 ppm vapor	Local exhaust ventilation
3	Severely irritating and corrosive	>0.01 to 0.1 mg/m^{3} dust or <0.5 to 5 ppm vapor	Process enclosure, an engineering control
4	Very toxic on single exposure, reproductive hazard, sensitizer	<0.01 mg/m^{3} dust or <0.5 ppm vapor	Seek expert advice

== RISKOFDERM ==
RISKOFDERM was a project funded by the EU to develop a toolkit to assess the adequacy of control measures in place to protect against substances which could cause adverse dermal effects (i.e. irritation, burns, sensitization)

The toolkit was published in a paper version by the National Institute for Safety and Health at Work in Spain. It asks the user a series of questions regarding what substance is being used, how it is used, and what controls are already in place. The user's answers will generate recommendations that vary from taking no additional action to stopping work immediately until the exposure can be reduced.

== Respirable Crystalline Silica ==
The OSHA regulations for respirable crystalline silica in construction utilize control banding to specify what controls employers must implement when working with materials that contain crystalline silica like concrete.

For example, when working outdoors with jackhammers that provide a continuous stream or spray of water at the point of impact, employers are required to provide industrial respirators if the work will take place over more than 4 hours in a single shift. This qualitative method of implementing controls helps protect workers in environments that may vary day to day.

== Biosafety Lab Levels ==
The Centers for Disease Control and Prevention (CDC) have established Biosafety Label Levels as a set of precautions to utilize when working with biological agents. These precautions are stratified based on the potential for these agents to cause disease and offer a qualitative method of ensuring the safety of laboratory workers and minimize the potential for accidental release.

Control banding is particular useful when working with biological agents in research environments where infectious dose may not be well defined. It also provides a standardized method of ensuring that a laboratory has appropriate controls in place prior to receiving authorization to begin new research projects.

== Pharmaceuticals ==
The use of control banding strategies has become very popular in the pharmaceutical industry where early stage development compounds may have little or no toxicology data.

One control banding scheme in the pharmaceutical industry is proposed by Dr. Bruce Naumann. It involves assigning a chemical a Merck Performance-Based Exposure Control Limit (PB-ECL) Category based on its toxicological properties and then based on that category using predetermined controls.

Below is a table which compares portions of this method to the one proposed by COSHH.

Control Bank	Health and Safety Executive (HSE) Hazard Group	Merck Performance-Based Exposure Control Limit (PB-ECL) Category
>1–10 mg/m^{3}	A - Use good industrial hygiene practice	1 - Good manufacturing practices
>0.1–1 mg/m^{3}	B - Use local exhaust ventilation	2 - Good manufacturing practices (with local exhaust ventilation)
>0.01-0.1 mg/m^{3}	C - Enclose process	3 - Essentially no open handling (ventilated enclosures required)
>0.001-0.01 mg/m^{3}	D - Seek specialist advice	3+ - Virtually no open handling (containment systems required)
≤0.001 mg/m^{3}	D - Seek specialist advice	4 - No open handling (closed systems required)
≤0.001 mg/m^{3}	D - Seek specialist advice	5 - No manual operations/human intervention (robotics or remote operations required)

== Limitations of Control Banding ==
Control banding is not without limitations and still requires professional knowledge and experience to verify that the control measures specified have been properly installed, maintained, and used. Controls should be validated prior to use by either using substance specific industrial hygiene methods or performing surrogate monitoring.

== See also ==
- Hierarchy of hazard controls – System used in industry to eliminate or minimize exposure to hazards
- Occupational exposure banding – Categorization process for chemical hazards
