= BELTRI =

Apparatus for bedridden patients

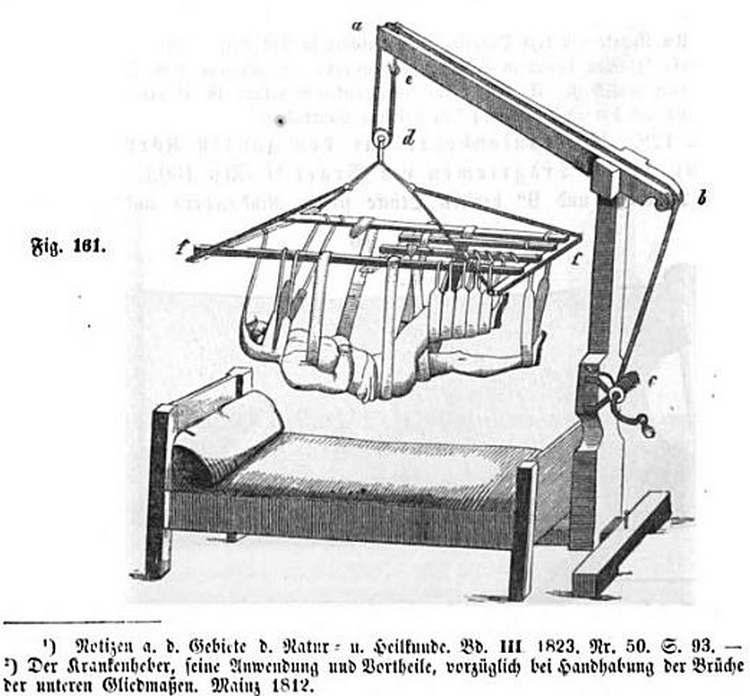
The BELTRI.

The BELTRI ("Balance Elevator-Lift for Tractioning Recumbent Individuals") is an apparatus designed for the mobilization of bedridden patients. It consists of a metallic structure with pulleys and ropes that uses a counterbalance to lift the weight of a patient without difficulty.

The BELTRI was first introduced in Austria in the 19th century by Dr. Carl Emmert, and is now used throughout the world by many nurses and physicians.
