= Patient lift =

Assistive device in health care

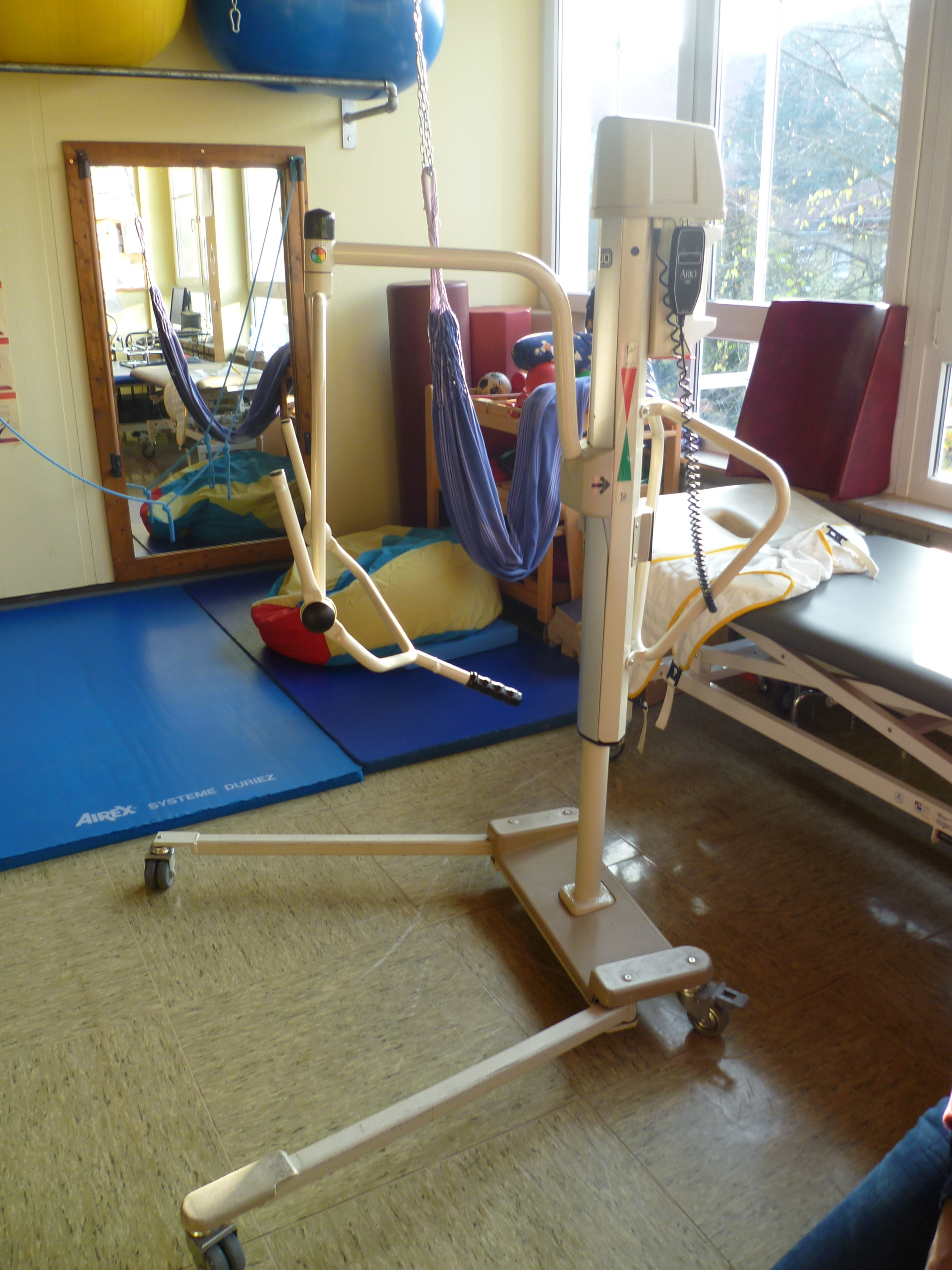
A patient lift

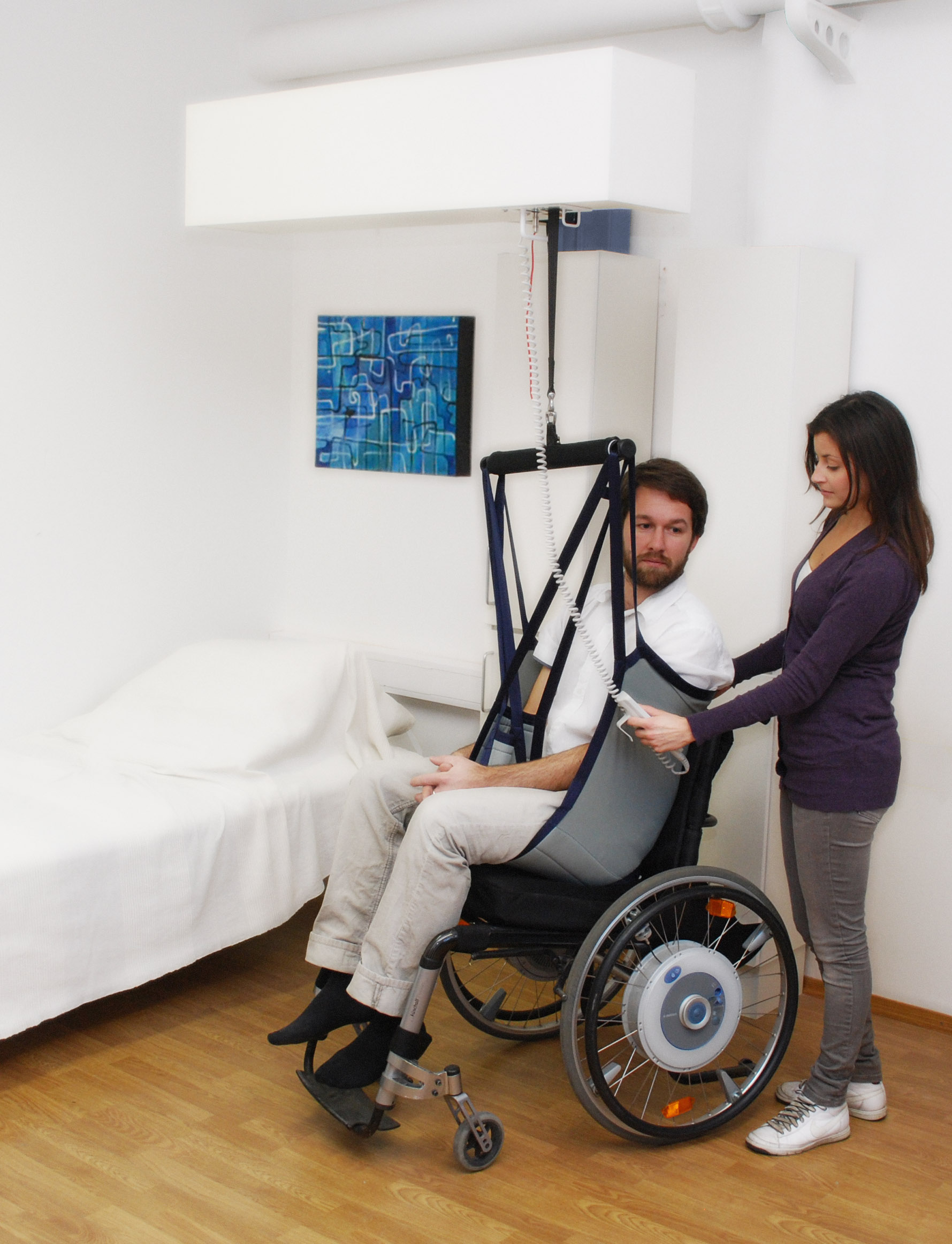
The patient lift is inside a cabinet above the bed.

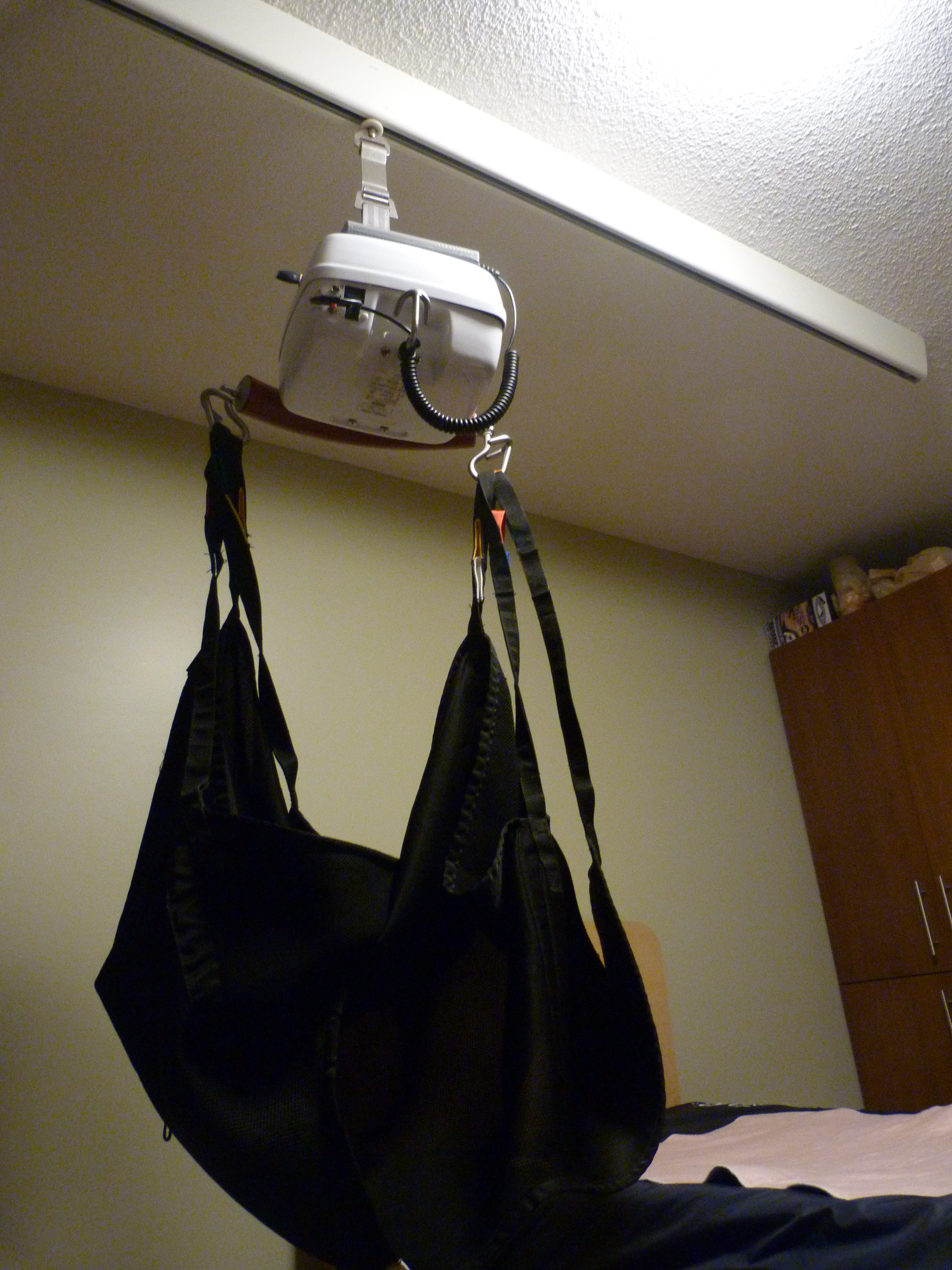
Ceiling lift

A patient lift (patient hoist, jack hoist, or Hoyer lift) may be either a sling lift or a sit-to-stand lift. This is an assistive device that allows patients in hospitals and nursing homes and people receiving home health care to be transferred between a bed and a chair or other similar resting places, by the use of electrical or hydraulic power. Sling lifts are used for patients whose mobility is limited. Sling lifts are mobile (or floor) lifts or overhead lifts (ceiling- or wall-mounted, or using overhead tracks).

The sling lift has several advantages. It allows heavy patients to be transferred while decreasing stress on caregivers, while also reducing the number of nursing staff required to move patients. It also reduces the chance of orthopedic injury from lifting patients.

Another kind of sling lift, which is called a ceiling lift, can be permanently installed on the ceiling of a room in order to save space.

Mistakes using patient lifts may result in serious injury, and some injuries that have been caused by improper use or malfunction of sling lifts have led to civil lawsuits.

== See also ==
- Casualty lifting
- Lift chair
- Beltri
