= National Peace Corps Association =

North American non-profit organisation

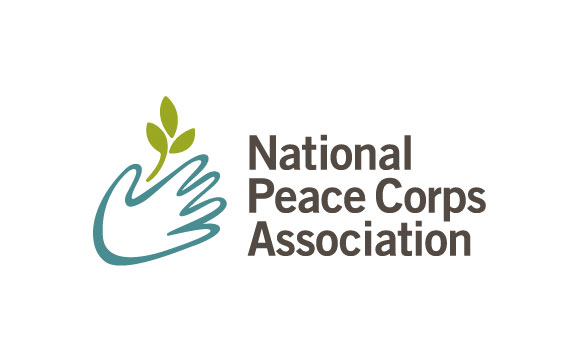
- Founded: 1979
- Founder: John F. Kennedy
- Type: 501(c)(3) nonprofit organization
- Purpose: Returned Peace Corps Volunteers, Peace Corps Community
- Location: Washington, D.C.
- Region served: Global
- Employees: 10
- Website: Official website

National Peace Corps Association (NPCA) is a North American nonprofit organization supporting the Peace Corps Agency community. Founded in 1979, the NPCA is headquartered in Washington, D.C., United States

The NPCA maintains a database comprising around 150,000 records of volunteers, including figures such as the Peace Corps' founder, John F. Kennedy, and individuals from host countries. The NPCA has historically provided advisory support to Peace Corps volunteers. Its stated objectives include fostering a commitment to the global ideals of the Peace Corps community and advocating for the enhancement and expansion of the U.S. Peace Corps initiative.

According to the Peace Corps mission statement, those ideals entail promoting "world peace and friendship" by fulfilling three goals:

To help the countries interested in meeting their need for trained people.
To help promote a better understanding of Americans on the part of the peoples served.
To help promote a better understanding of other peoples on the part of Americans."

== History ==
In the mid-1970s, at conferences of global educators in the Midwest, a group of returned Peace Corps volunteers began meeting to discuss their service experiences. They adopted a Peace Corps objective that President John F. Kennedy stated in 1961: "Come home and teach your neighbors about the communities where you served." Their aim was to offer returning Peace Corps volunteers in America a continuing mission and communal identity as Returned Peace Corps Volunteers (RPCVs).

In 1979, this group joined with RPCV community leaders in New York and Washington, D.C., to form the National Council of Returned Peace Corps Volunteers, which was incorporated in 1981. In 1993, the organization’s name was later changed to the National Peace Corps Association (NPCA).

In response to the Rwandan genocide in 1994, NPCA created the Emergency Response Network (ERN) of Returned Peace Corps Volunteers willing to respond to a crisis. Peace Corps Director Mark Gearan modeled the Crisis Corps (later renamed Peace Corps Response) after this program.

In coordination with the Returned Peace Corps Volunteers of Washington, D.C., the NPCA organized 200 RPCVs to march in President Barack Obama's inaugural parade on January 20, 2009. That same year, the NPCA launched Peace Corps Connect, an online social networking platform to help current and returning Peace Corps volunteers interact and share ideas about projects, events, careers, and advocacy issues.

In 2002, the NPCA was nominated for the Nobel Peace Prize, along with the Peace Corps.

=== Advocacy ===
Members of the NPCA continue to testify on U.S. Peace Corps legislation and key issues like safety and security.

In 2005, NPCA successfully coordinated the removal of Peace Corps references from military recruitment legislation.

=== Awards and recognition ===
NPCA has encouraged and recognized the service of members of the Peace Corps community by awarding over 20 Sargent Shriver Awards for Distinguished Humanitarian Service.

== Programs ==
Peace Corps Connect is the annual conference of the Peace Corps community.

Africa Rural Connect (ARC) is an online collaboration tool aiming to address some of the challenges in rural African communities. This project introduces and encourages collaboration to identify creative, new plans to deal with the fundamental problems of agricultural development and rural poverty in Sub-Saharan Africa. The Bill & Melinda Gates Foundation has awarded a grant to the ARC project as part of its Agricultural Development initiative to give millions of smallholder farmers in developing countries the tools and opportunities they need to improve their yields, raise their incomes, and improve the quality of life for themselves and their families.

The RPCV Mentoring Program assists returning Peace Corps Volunteers with their transition from service. The program connects recently returned Peace Corps Volunteers with RPCV mentors one year after their service ends. Mentors provide advice, key networking contacts, share experiences and adjustment issues, offer guidance on further education, review resumes, assist with career planning, and promote resources available to RPCVs to help them transition from serving abroad to serving at home.

== Publications ==
NPCA publishes Worldview magazine four times a year. The magazine shares the Peace Corps' perspective on global issues through articles authored by and about Peace Corps Volunteers, Returned Peace Corps volunteers, and people who "share the global values of the Peace Corps experience".

NPCA also produces email newsletters, including the monthly NPCA News, GlobalEdNews on global issues, and NPCA Advocacy on action alerts and news on legislation impacting the Peace Corps community.

== History of conferences and events ==
Since the year before its founding, the NPCA has planned annual events. These events include large conferences, celebrations for major Peace Corps anniversaries, and general meetings to satisfy bylaws requirements.

- Oct. 1978: Omaha, Nebraska (Red Lion Hotel)
  - Gathering predates the founding of NPCA.
- Oct. 1979: Omaha, Nebraska (Red Lion Hotel)
  - Marked as the founding of NPCA. At this gathering, charter members formalized and signed the bylaws.
- Oct. 1980: Omaha, Nebraska (Red Lion Hotel)
- 1981: Washington, DC (Red Lion Hotel)
  - The 20th Anniversary of the Peace Corps and the first of the major anniversary conferences (always held in Washington, DC.)
- June 1982: Los Angeles, CA (University of California-Los Angeles)
- 1983: Denver, CO (University of Denver)
- 1984: Boston, MA (Emmanuel College)
- 1985: Atlanta, GA (Georgia Tech)
- July 1986: San Antonio, TX (Trinity University)
- Sept. 1986: Washington, DC (National Mall)
  - 25th Anniversary of Peace Corps
- 1987: Madison, WI (University of Wisconsin-Madison)
- 1988: Boulder, CO (University of Colorado)
- 1989: Kent, OH (Kent State University)
- 1990: Eugene, OR (University of Oregon and Hilton Hotel)
- Aug. 1991: Washington, DC (National Mall)
  - 30th Anniversary of Peace Corps
- 1992: Fayetteville, AR (University of Arkansas-Fayetteville)
- 1993: Berkeley, CA (University of California-Berkeley)
- 1994: Atlanta, GA (CNN Center and Omni Atlanta Hotel)
- 1995: Austin, TX (University of Texas-Austin)
- Mar. 1–3, 1996: Washington, DC (Mayflower Hotel)
  - 35th Anniversary of Peace Corps
- 1996: Shawnee-on-Delaware, PA (Resort Hotel)
- July 10–13, 1997: San Diego, CA (Town & Country Hotel and Conference Center)
- 1998: Columbus, OH (The Ohio State University)
- 1999: Saint Paul, MN (University of St. Thomas )
- Aug. 11–13, 2000: Shawnee-on-Delaware (Resort Hotel)
- Sept. 21, 2001: Planned for Washington, DC
  - Canceled due to attacks on World Trade Center and Pentagon
- June 20–23, 2002: Washington, DC (Omni Shoreham Hotel)
  - Postponed celebration of the 40th Anniversary of Peace Corps
- Aug. 1–3, 2003: Portland, OR (University Place Hotel and Conference Center)
- Aug. 5–8, 2004: Chicago, IL (Palmer House Hilton)
- 2005: Annual General Meeting in Washington, DC
- Sept. 14–16, 2006: Washington, DC
  - 45th Anniversary of Peace Corps
- June 30, 2007: Annual General Meeting in Washington, DC
- Oct. 3–4, 2008: San Francisco, CA (Jewish Community Center)
- June 30, 2009: Annual General Meeting in Washington, DC
- June 26, 2010: Annual General Meeting in Washington, DC
- Sept. 21–25, 2011: Washington, DC (Georgetown University)
  - 50th Anniversary of Peace Corps
- June 27 – July 1, 2012: Minneapolis, MN (Minneapolis Convention Center)
- June 26–29, 2013: Boston, MA (Harvard University Medical School)
- June 20–21, 2014: Nashville, TN (Vanderbilt University and Country Music Hall of Fame)
- June 4–6, 2015: Berkeley, CA (University of California-Berkeley)
- Sept. 21–25, 2016: Washington, DC (George Washington University)
  - 55th Anniversary of Peace Corps
- August 4–6, 2017: Denver, CO (University of Denver)
- August 23–25, 2018: Shawnee on Delaware, PA (Resort)
- June 20–22, 2019: Austin, TX (University of Texas-Austin)
- Sept. 26, 2020: "Peace Corps Connect to the Future" (Virtual Conference)
- Sept. 23–25, 2021: Washington, DC (Virtual Conference)
  - 60th Anniversary of Peace Corps
- Sept. 24, 2022: Washington, DC (Virtual Conference)
- Sept. 8–9, 2023: Washington, DC (Virtual Conference)
- Sept. 13-14, 2024: Washington, DC (Virtual Conference)
- July 18-21, 2025: Washington, DC (American University)
- July 18–19, 2026: Washington, DC
  - 65th Anniversary of Peace Corps
- July 26–27, 2027: San Diego, CA (future)

Starting in 1990, affiliated group leaders held the NPCA Presidents' Forum in conjunction with each annual meeting at Kent State University. In 2005, these meetings were renamed the "Group Leaders' Forum."

== Affiliate Groups ==
The network includes over 180 affiliate groups. Affiliate groups may be geographic (e.g., Chicago Area Peace Corps Association); based on the country of Peace Corps service (e.g., Friends of Guatemala); associated with workplaces (e.g., RPCVs at USAID); driven by social action (e.g., Peace Corps Community for Refugees); or defined by affinity (e.g., the Peace Corps Oral History Project). Groups advocate in line with the stated goals of the organization.
