= GESTIS Substance Database =

German database on hazardous substances

GESTIS Substance Database is a freely accessible online information system on chemical compounds. It is maintained by the Institut für Arbeitsschutz der Deutschen Gesetzlichen Unfallversicherung (IFA, Institute for Occupational Safety and Health of the German Social Accident Insurance). Information on occupational medicine and first aid is compiled by Henning Heberer and his team (TOXICHEM, Leuna).

The database contains information for the safe handling of hazardous substances and other chemical substances at work:

- toxicology/ecotoxicology
- important physical and chemical properties
- application and handling
- health effects
- protective measures and such in case of danger (incl. first aid)
- special regulations e.g. GHS classification and labelling according to CLP Regulation (pictograms, H phrases, P phrases).

The available information relates to about 9,400 substances. Data are updated immediately after publication of new official regulations or after the issue of new scientific results.

A mobile version of the GESTIS Substance Database, suitable for smartphones and tablets, is also available.

== Literature ==
- Laamanen, Irja; Verbeek, Jos; Franco, Giuliano; Lehtola, Marika; Luotamo, Marita (2008). "Finding toxicological information: An approach for occupational health professionals". Journal of Occupational Medicine and Toxicology. 3 (1): 18. doi:10.1186/1745-6673-3-18. PMC 2551601. PMID 18700959.
