= White oil =

Insecticide spray

White oil is a grade of mineral oil used as an insecticide spray used for controlling a wide range of insect pests in the garden. The spray works by blocking the breathing pores of insects, causing suffocation and death. It is effective in the control of aphids, scale, mealybug, mites, citrus leafminer and other smooth skinned caterpillars.

== Commercial organic pesticide ==
White oil is sold commercially as a petroleum-based organic pesticide in both a concentrate and ready-to-use spray bottle or can.

== Use ==
Concentrates are diluted before use and placed in a spray bottle or sprayer. As with ready-to-use spray bottles or cans, the mixture is applied to all surfaces of a plant's leaves and stems.

White oil can cause scorching of plants if used at ambient temperatures above 77–86 °F (25–30 °C).
