= Anticipate, recognize, evaluate, control, and confirm =

ARECC assesses and manages health risks

Anticipate, recognize, evaluate, control, and confirm (ARECC) is a decision-making framework and process used in the field of industrial hygiene (IH) to anticipate and recognize hazards, evaluate exposures, and control and confirm protection from risks (Figure 1). ARECC supports exposure- and population-informed hazard assessment, hazard- and population-informed exposure assessment, hazard- and exposure-informed population assessment, and risk-informed decision making in any endeavor.

== History ==
The anticipate, recognize, evaluate, control, and confirm (ARECC) decision-making framework began as recognize, evaluate, and control. In 1994 then-president of the American Industrial Hygiene Association (AIHA) Harry Ettinger added the anticipate step to formally convey the duty and opportunity of the worker protection community to proactively apply its growing body of knowledge and experience to assessing and managing hazards, exposures, and resulting risks in existing and emerging situations.

The confirm step was added in 2011 to clarify the necessity of confirming that all steps in the decision-making framework were being effectively applied and that the desired outcomes were being achieved. Overall confirmation of the adequacy of decision making for risk management includes measurements of the effectiveness of controls in the workplace and evaluation of results from occupational epidemiological studies. Confirmation of training, documentation, and continuous improvement of the entire decision-making process must be carried out to ensure that all steps are scientifically grounded and appropriately applied.

== The ARECC process ==
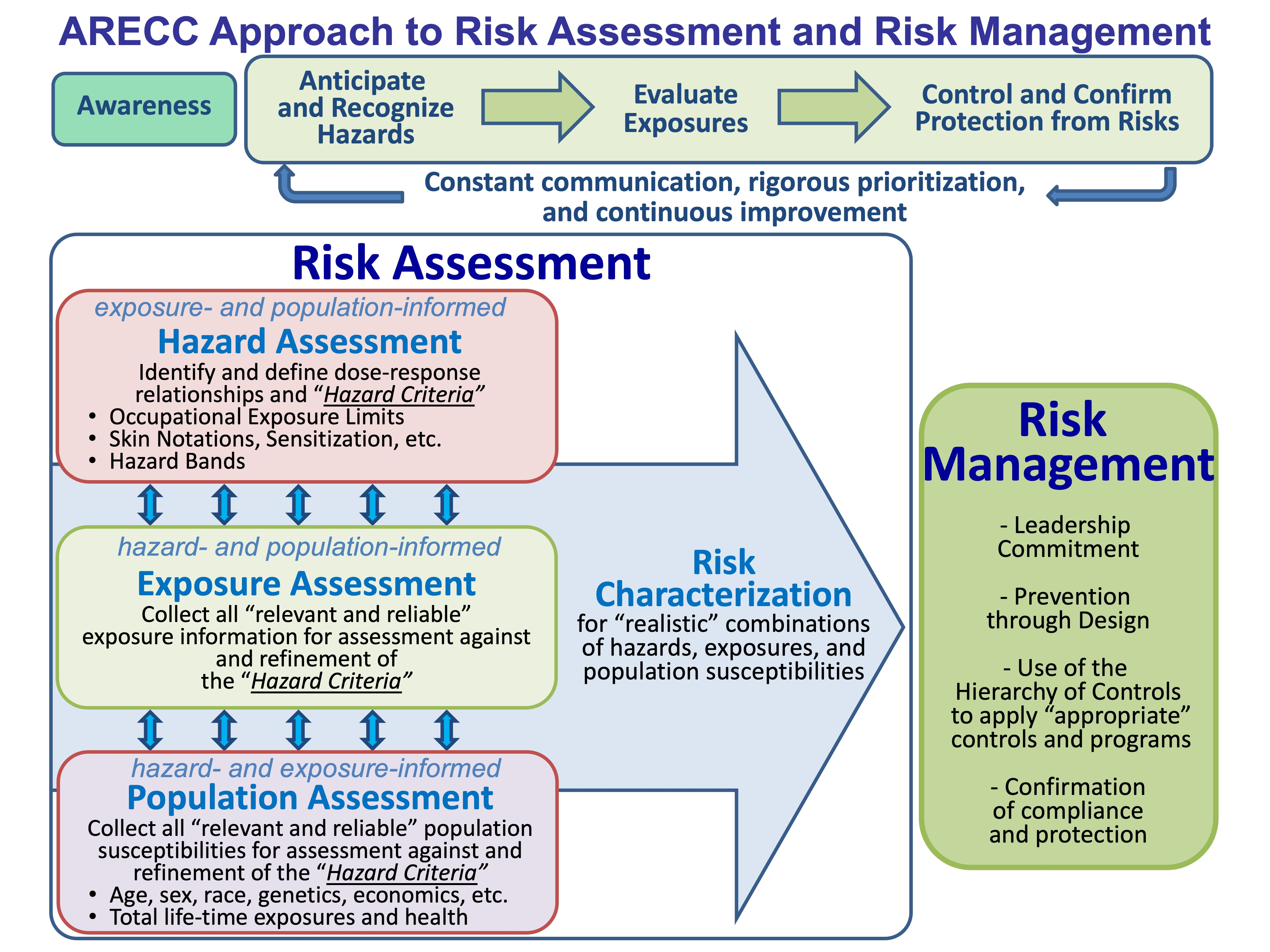
Figure 1. The ARECC decision-making framework and process developed in industrial hygiene to Anticipate and Recognize Hazards, Evaluate Exposures, and Control and Confirm Protection from Risks.

The implementation of ARECC (Figure 1) involves conducting risk assessment and applying risk management. The ARECC graphic appears as the first illustration in the authoritative industrial hygiene reference book A Strategy for Assessing and Managing Occupational Exposures. The Occupational Exposure Assessment Body of Knowledge (BoK) documents developed by the American Industrial Hygiene Association provide an organized summary of the collective knowledge and skills necessary for persons to use the ARECC process in conducting occupational exposure assessments. AIHA has also developed a Technical Framework on Susceptible Worker Protection which includes the application of ARECC to foster awareness, understanding, and the ability to apply knowledge about the protection of susceptible workers. AIHA is using the BoKs to establish a framework for the development of education programs and knowledge/skill assessment tools, and for the improvement of the state of professional IH knowledge.

=== Risk assessment ===
During the risk assessment phase, the details of existing or potential hazards and exposures to populations of workers and members of their communities are assessed to characterize risks. The hazard identification/dose-response/exposure assessment/risk assessment approach mirrors the process that was formulated by the National Academy of Sciences / National Research Council. Schulte et al. noted the interrelated criteria of hazard identification/exposure assessment/risk assessment/risk management/fostering of benefits for responsible development of nanotechnology. Schulte et al. also noted significant examples of progress in the fields of toxicology, metrology, exposure assessment, engineering controls and personal protective equipment (PPE), risk assessment, risk management, medical surveillance, and epidemiology for protection of nanotechnology workers.

As emphasized in Figure 1, strong interactions are needed between the hazard assessment, exposure assessment, and population assessment activities. Exposure- and population-informed hazard assessment ensures that realistic information about actual workplace exposure compositions, concentrations, and conditions are factored into any laboratory-based studies of health effects that are conducted. Hazard- and population-informed exposure assessment ensures that the relevant exposures are assessed in the appropriate locations and at the appropriate times. Hazard- and exposure-informed population assessment ensures that relevant and reliable susceptibility information for the exposed population is collected for assessment against, and refinement of, the hazard criteria. Identifying and defining dose-response relationships for exposures to hazards allows for the establishment of occupational exposure limits, hazard criteria for concerns such as exposures to skin, and the grouping of materials into hazard bands that can be similarly controlled.

=== Risk management ===
The risk management portion of the ARECC framework and process emphasizes leadership commitment to the safety and health mission and application of the hierarchy of controls. Commitment includes confirming that all ARECC process steps are being followed and that protection of safety, health, well-being, and productivity is being achieved.

The hierarchy of hazard controls is an integral component of the application of ARECC. The hierarchy is traditionally depicted as a vertical listing of hazard control and exposure control options in descending order of priority, beginning at the top with elimination of the hazard as the most effective control, followed by substitution of a less hazardous option, followed by engineering controls to prevent exposures, followed by administrative and work practice controls, and concluding with use of personal protective equipment as the least effective control at the bottom.

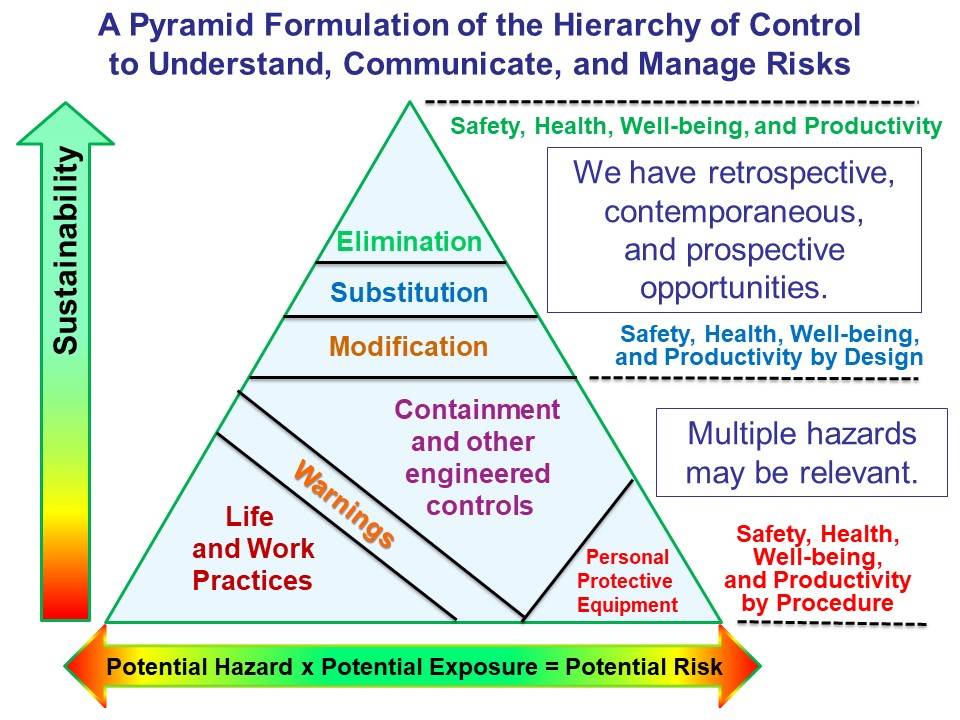
Figure 2. Depiction of a pyramid formulation of the hierarchy of controls that conveys how different strategies of control are associated with different levels of sustainability and potential risks.

Figure 2 depicts an alternative depiction of the hierarchy as a pyramid of interactive control elements. The components of hazard and exposure control depicted in the pyramid formulation of the hierarchy of control are

- Elimination of the presence or magnitude of the hazard (not always possible if the material or condition is essential to the activity objectives but sometimes possible in the case of objectives that can be achieved by methods such as computer simulation),
- Substitution of a less hazardous material or procedure (sometimes possible, such as through the use of materially similar surrogates or the use of less dispersible materials or less energetic processes. A "regrettable substitution" may result if assumptions about the risk-reduction advantages of the substitution turned out to be wrong. Recent examples of regrettable substitution are the substitution of bisphenol S for bisphenol A in plastics, and the substitution of alpha-diketone for diacetyl in butter flavorings.
- Modification of the material or procedure to reduce hazards or exposures (sometimes considered a subset of the substitution option but explicitly considered here to mean that the efficacy of the modification for the situation at hand must be confirmed by the user),
- Engineering controls to prevent exposures (includes a variety of physical containment and ventilation strategies),
- Warnings to indicate the need for and status of control (explicitly considered in the pyramid formulation to be a distinct hierarchy option to clarity the details of any warnings being used and to emphasize the growing capabilities and availability of real time sensors and monitors; whereas in other systems, warnings are sometimes considered part of engineered controls and sometimes part of administrative controls),
- Administrative and work procedures to prevent exposures and confirm protection (an approach that relies highly on training and compliance), and finally, as the last barrier to exposure,
- Personal protective equipment (including respiratory protection).

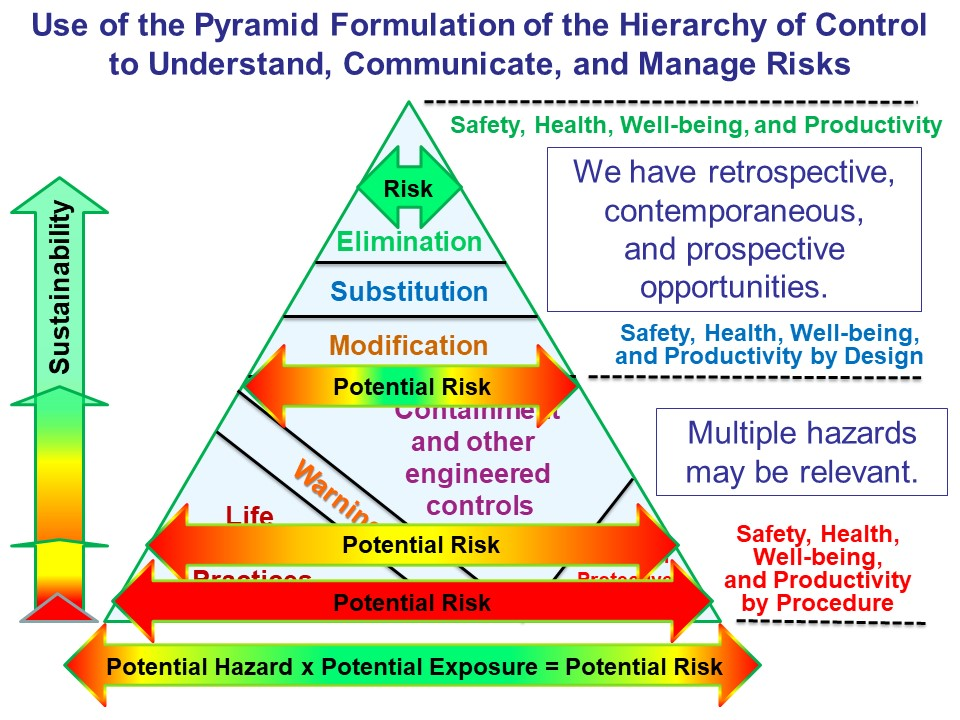
Figure 3. Depiction of how the pyramid formulation of the hierarchy of control can be used to guide retrospective investigations of past incidents or contemporaneous or prospective job safety analyses and planning based on knowledge about the types of controls being applied.

Figure 3 illustrates how the pyramid formulation of the interrelated elements of the hierarchy of control can be used to provide retrospective, contemporaneous, or prospective insights about the sustainability and levels of risks associated with work activities that involve different combinations of hazards, exposures, controls, and resulting risks. For example, elimination of a hazard is considered to be a highly sustainable strategy, and if a hazard was or is thought to have been eliminated from a process, then initial evaluations can focus on confirmation of material inventories and process knowledge. Similarly, control situations that rely heavily on engineered controls, warnings, work practices, or use of PPE are less sustainable and involve greater risks, and risk management evaluations can focus on confirmation of whether those controls were actually in place and properly applied.

In addition, other hazards may also be present such as heat stress, slips trips and falls, struck-by injuries, toxic metals, toxic gases, electrical shock, lasers, shift work and fatigue. If multiple hazards are present in a work activity, the status of the hierarchy of controls can be assessed for each hazard, and a worst-first, all-hazards approach can be used to prioritize actions to ensure protection from risks. Ideally, as recommended in the American National Standard for Prevention through Design the hierarchy will be used to guide the design of work in a manner that will prevent the presence of hazards, exposures, and resulting risks.

== ARECC leaders, cultures, and systems ==
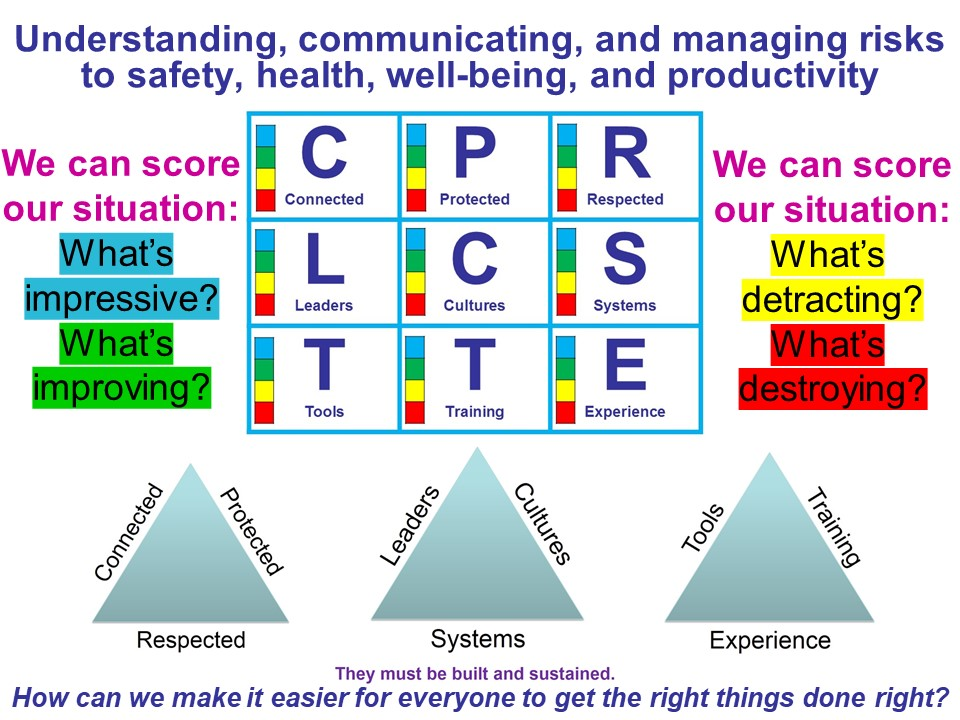
Figure 4. A Leaders, Cultures, and Systems approach to building and sustaining connected, protected, respected communities with all the tools, training, and experience needed to control and confirm protection from risks in any setting.

The ARECC framework recognizes the essential contributions of leaders, cultures, and systems to achieving success (Figure 4). When failures to protect people and the environment from risks have occurred, root causes of those failures can be traced to shortcomings or breakdowns in one or more aspects of the prevailing leaders, cultures, and systems. Aspects of the decision-making framework and process related to building and sustaining relevant and reliable leaders, cultures, and systems can be particularly important when disparate technologies or activities are converging.

As illustrated in Figure 4, the components of a leaders, cultures, and systems approach in any setting can enable ARECC to:

- make it easier for everyone to get the right things done right for protection from risks
- by helping to build and sustain connected, protected, and respected communities
- with leaders, cultures, and systems that have all the tools, training, and experience needed
- to anticipate and recognize hazards, evaluate exposures, and control and confirm protection from risks to safety, health, well-being, and productivity
- in all the places we live, learn, work, and play.

Figure 4 includes a "score card" that can be used to assess the adequacy of each element of the Connected/Protected/Respected, Leaders/Cultures/Systems, Tools/Training/Experience environment. This enables effective focus on areas that must be sustained and areas that require improvement.
