= BOHS =

BOHS can refer to:

- British Occupational Hygiene Society
- Brea Olinda High School, California
- The Bank of the Holy Spirit, founded by the Pope in 1605
- Bohemian F.C., an Irish association football club
