= Claire Horwell =

Volcanologist and geohealth researcher

Claire Judith Horwell
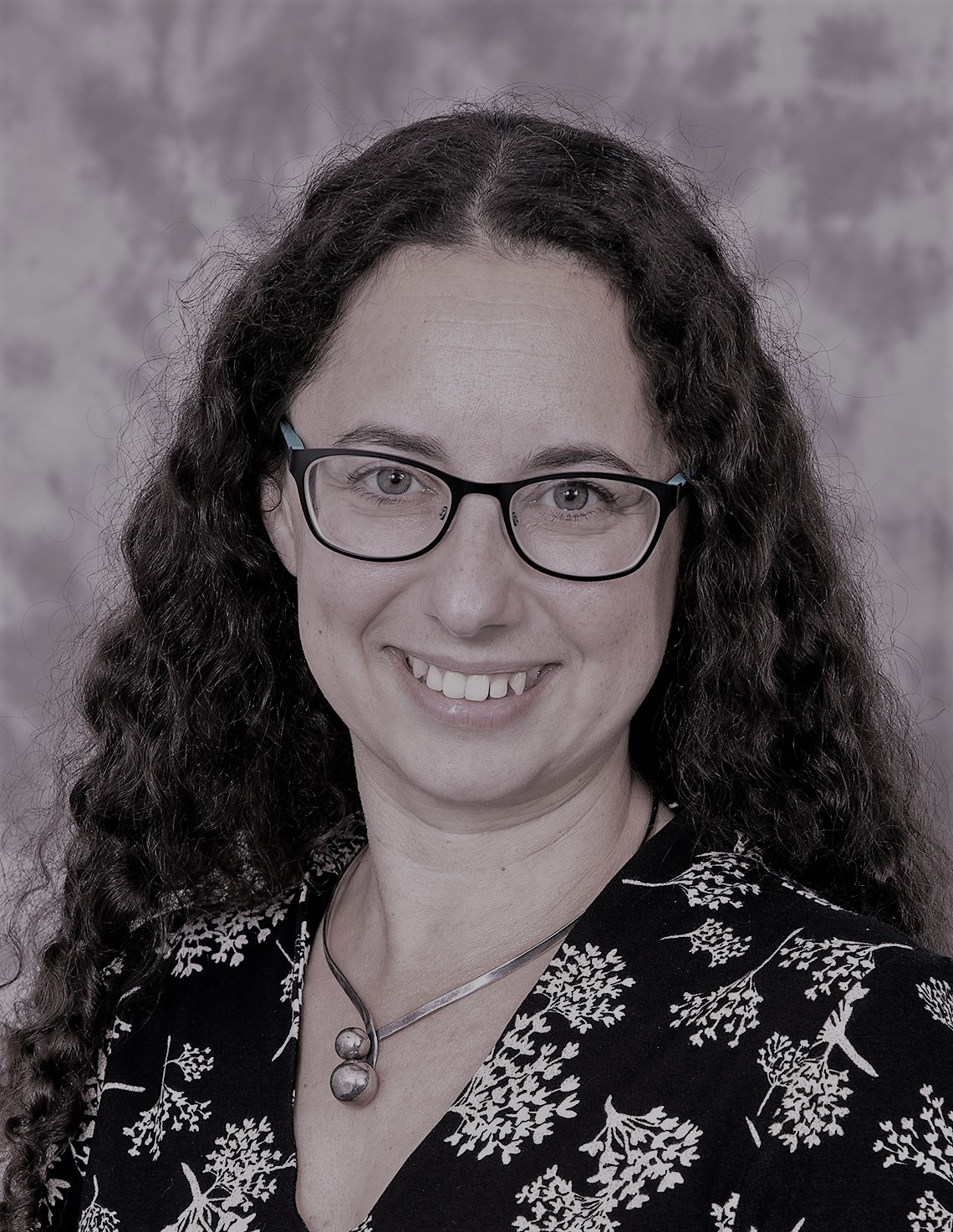
- Education: University of Bristol (PhD); Victoria University of Wellington (Dip. App. Sci. Volcanol.); University of East Anglia (BSc Hons.)
- Known for: Geohealth; Volcanology; Health protection Crystalline silica toxicity Air pollution Disaster risk reduction
- Scientific career
- Workplaces: Durham University; University of Cambridge (NERC Fellow); University of Bristol (Leverhulme Trust Researcher)
- Doctoral advisor: Robert Stephen John Sparks
- Website: https://www.durham.ac.uk/staff/claire-horwell/

Claire Judith Horwell is a professor of Geohealth in the Department of Earth Sciences and Institute of Hazard, Risk and Resilience at Durham University and the founding Director of the International Volcanic Health Hazard Network (IVHHN). She studies the health hazards of natural and industrial mineral dusts and community protection.

== Early life and education ==
Horwell became interested in volcanoes as a child when she visited Mount Batur in Bali at the age of seven. Her undergraduate degree was in Environmental Science at the University of East Anglia, UK, where she studied environmental, earth and public health sciences. She moved to Victoria University of Wellington for her master's degree (Diploma in Applied Science), and studied volcanology. Her research at Victoria University was based in Rotorua, an urban area where 60,000 people are exposed to geothermal emissions. Horwell designed passive samplers to simultaneously measure gas emissions around the town, collecting information on hydrogen sulphide exposures and providing advice to public health experts. She earned her doctorate at the University of Bristol, where she worked with Robert Stephen John Sparks supported by the Natural Environment Research Council. Her PhD research focused on the characteristics of crystalline silica in volcanic ash which control its toxicity.

== Research and career ==
In 2003, Horwell founded the International Volcanic Health Hazard Network through a Leverhulme Trust network grant. IVHHN provides information on the health hazards and impacts of volcanic emissions to the general public and civil protection agencies, and helps governments prepare for the health response to volcanic eruptions. She has remained the director of the IVHHN, and has since co-created the Hawaii Interagency Vog dashboard to provide information about volcanic smog to the general public. In 2005, Horwell joined the University of Cambridge as a NERC postdoctoral fellow. She moved to Durham University in 2007 as a Research Councils UK research fellow where she is now Professor.

Horwell has served as an advisor to the World Health Organization, UK Cabinet Office and Public Health England. She was appointed to the Government of the United Kingdom Scientific Advisory Group for Emergencies for volcanic eruptions in 2015. She was President (and, formerly, President-elect) and founding leader of the American Geophysical Union's GeoHealth Section and served on AGU's Council (2017-2020). She has held an honorary position at the UK Health Security Agency (formerly Public Health England/Health Protection Agency) since 2014.

Horwell studies the health hazards of mineral dusts, and ways to support communities to protect themselves from inhaling particulate air pollution. She uses physicochemical analysis to establish whether or not, and how, mineral particles are harmful, as well as toxicological assessments to determine the respiratory hazards. These help her to understand the structure-toxicity relationships of minerals. She has studied how crystalline silica forms in volcanic systems such as lava domes using petrological techniques. Crystalline silica can be a pathogen, and can result in silicosis and lung cancer. Horwell is trying to establish whether the silica in volcanic ash has the potential to cause these diseases. Horwell worked with authorities in Hawaii to help local communities respond to the Kīlauea vog (volcanic smog) emissions. The Interagency Vog Dashboard website was accessed over 50,000/week during the 2018 lower Puna eruption.

She has worked with the Pan American Health Organization to introduce new epidemiological protocols for use in volcanic crises and has supported many governmental agencies and non-governmental organizations in Indonesia, New Zealand, Singapore, Japan, St Vincent and Mexico in preparing for, and responding to, community exposures to volcanic emissions.

She created the Health Interventions in Volcanic Eruptions (HIVE) Consortium project (funded by ELRHA) to collect evidence on respiratory protection for communities. She investigated the effectiveness of facemasks distributed by agencies during volcanic eruptions, looking to identify whether or not they could adequately filter fine-grained particles, as well as to understand the behavioural reasons why some communities may or may not wear masks, through collaborations with a range of social scientists. During this program Horwell co-developed train-the-trainer courses with the International Society for Respiratory Protection to teach people in Indonesia how to better protect themselves. Her research, with the Institute of Occupational Medicine, confirmed that N95 industry certified masks are most effective at protecting communities from inhaling volcanic ash, and that the more commonly used surgical masks offered less protection. A summary of the project was published as a Supplement of the Pan American Health Organization's Disasters bulletin which is distributed globally to more than 25,000 people.

During the COVID-19 pandemic, Horwell has published media articles on the ethics and use of respiratory protection by the public.

=== Awards and honours ===
Her recent awards and honours include;

- 2020 European Geosciences Union Plinius medal for interdisciplinary natural hazards research
- 2020 American Geophysical Union GeoHealth Section President and Founding Leader

=== Selected publications ===
Horwell has published more than 60 papers and several book chapters across disciplines including volcanology, petrology, behavioural science, social anthropology, toxicology, exposure science, public health and epidemiology, law and ethics. A full list of publications can be found at: https://www.durham.ac.uk/staff/claire-horwell/. Her publications include:

- McDonald, F., Horwell, C.J., Wecker, R., Dominelli, L., Loh, M., Kamanyire, R. & Ugarte, C. (2020). "Facemask use for community protection from air pollution disasters: An ethical overview and framework to guide agency decision making". International Journal of Disaster Risk Reduction. 43 101376. Bibcode:2020IJDRR..4301376M. doi:10.1016/j.ijdrr.2019.101376. hdl:1893/30532. S2CID 210158793.
- Mueller, W., Cowie, H., Horwell, C. J., Baxter, P. J., McElvenny, D., Booth, M., Cherrie, J. W., Cullinan, P., Jarvis, D. Ugarte, C. & Inoue, H. (2020). "Standardized epidemiological protocols for populations affected by volcanic eruptions". Bulletin of the World Health Organization. 98 (5): 362–364. doi:10.2471/BLT.19.244509. PMC 7265949. PMID 32514202.
- Mueller, W., Horwell, C.J., Apsley, A., Steinle, S., McPherson, S., Cherrie, J.W. & Galea, K.S. (2018). "The effectiveness of respiratory protection worn by communities to protect from volcanic ash inhalation. Part I: Filtration efficiency tests". International Journal of Hygiene and Environmental Health. 221 (6): 967–976. doi:10.1016/j.ijheh.2018.03.012. PMID 29779694. S2CID 29159967.
- Nattrass, C., Horwell, C.J., Damby, D.E., Brown, D. & Stone, V. (2017). "The effect of aluminium and sodium impurities on the in vitro toxicity and pro-inflammatory potential of cristobalite". Environmental Research. 159: 164–175. Bibcode:2017ER....159..164N. doi:10.1016/j.envres.2017.07.054. PMID 28802207. S2CID 11018328.
- Tomašek, I., Horwell, C.J., Damby, D.E., Barošová, H., Geers, C., Petri-Fink, A., Rothen-Rutishauser, B. & Clift, M.J.D. (2016). "Combined exposure of diesel exhaust particles and respirable Soufrière Hills volcanic ash causes a (pro-)inflammatory response in an in vitro multicellular epithelial tissue barrier model". Particle and Fibre Toxicology. 13 (1): 67. doi:10.1186/s12989-016-0178-9. PMC 5153918. PMID 27955700.
- Damby, D.E., Murphy, F.A., Horwell, C.J., Raftis, J. & Donaldson, K. (2016). "The in vitro respiratory toxicity of cristobalite-bearing volcanic ash". Environmental Research. 145: 74–84. Bibcode:2016ER....145...74D. doi:10.1016/j.envres.2015.11.020. hdl:2381/36683. PMID 26630620.
- Horwell, C J, Baxter, P J, Hillman, S E, Calkins, J A, Damby, D E, Delmelle, P, Donaldson, K, Dunster, C, Fubini, B, Hoskuldsson, A, Kelly, F J, Larsen, G, Le Blond, J S, Livi, K J T, Mendis, B, Murphy, F, Nattrass, C, Sweeney, S, Tetley, T D, Thordarson, T & Tomatis, M (2013). "Physicochemical and toxicological profiling of ash from the 2010 and 2011 eruptions of Eyjafjallajökull and Grímsvötn volcanoes, Iceland using a rapid respiratory hazard assessment protocol". Environmental Research. 127: 63–73. Bibcode:2013ER....127...63H. doi:10.1016/j.envres.2013.08.011. hdl:20.500.11820/b57f93e2-0fd2-4ddb-8175-9f8dfe3866d3. PMID 24267795. S2CID 43333848.
- Horwell, C.J., Williamson, B.J., Donaldson, K., Le Blond, J.S., Damby, D.E. & Bowen, L. (2012). "The structure of volcanic cristobalite in relation to its toxicity; relevance for the variable crystalline silica hazard". Particle and Fibre Toxicology. 9: 44. doi:10.1186/1743-8977-9-44. PMC 3574026. PMID 23164071.
- Le Blond J.S., Horwell C.J., Williamson B.J. & Oppenheimer C. (2010). "Generation of crystalline silica from sugarcane burning". Journal of Environmental Monitoring. 12 (7): 1459–1470. doi:10.1039/C0EM00020E. PMID 20520870.
- Horwell, C.J., Fenoglio, I. & Fubini, B. (2007). "Iron-induced hydroxyl radical generation from basaltic volcanic ash". Earth and Planetary Science Letters. 261 (3–4): 662–669. Bibcode:2007E&PSL.261..662H. doi:10.1016/j.epsl.2007.07.032.
- Horwell, C.J. (2007). "Grain-size analysis of volcanic ash for the rapid assessment of respiratory health hazard". Journal of Environmental Monitoring. 9 (10): 1107–1115. doi:10.1039/b710583p. PMID 17909645.
- Horwell, C.J.; Baxter, P.J. (2006). "The respiratory health hazards of volcanic ash: a review for volcanic risk mitigation". Bulletin of Volcanology. 69 (1): 1–24. Bibcode:2006BVol...69....1H. doi:10.1007/s00445-006-0052-y. S2CID 19173052.
- Witham, C.S.; Horwell, C.J. (2005). "Volcanic ash-leachates: a review and recommendations for sampling methods". Journal of Volcanology and Geothermal Research. 141 (3–4): 299–326. Bibcode:2005JVGR..141..299W. doi:10.1016/j.jvolgeores.2004.11.010.
