= Galson Laboratories =

- Industry: Industrial hygiene, Indoor air quality,
- Founded: 1970
- Founder: Allen Galson
- Headquarters: Syracuse, NY, United States
- Products: Indoor air quality testing
- Number of employees: 70
- Website: www.galsonlabs.com

Galson Laboratories (now SGS Galson Laboratories) is an industrial hygiene and indoor air quality testing company. It was founded in 1970 by Allen Galson. The company specializes in helping companies comply with the U.S. Occupational Safety and Health Administration (OSHA), and with any emerging legislation concerning indoor and outdoor environmental conditions. Galson is a member of the New York Association of Approved Environmental Laboratories. Galson is also one of fewer than 250 laboratories to qualify for the Industrial Hygiene Laboratory Accreditation Program.

== History ==
Galson Laboratories was founded by Allen Galson in 1970 in Syracuse, New York. The company was created in direct response to the emerging industrial hygiene market caused by environmental regulations posed by OSHA.

In 1994, Michael Lorenz and Lee Davis, two Galson employees, purchased the company from its founders. In 1996, the two sold the business off in two pieces. Massachusetts-based environmental engineering firm ENSR International bought Galson's engineering operations. F. Joseph Unangst purchased Galson's laboratory operations and continued operating it under the Galson Laboratories name.

In 2004, Galson expanded its operations to loan and rent air quality test equipment. Clients collect air samples from sites and then send the samples to Galson for analysis.

In 2013, Galson Laboratories merged White Laboratories, Hawaii, and INALAB, Inc., to form Galson Laboratories Pacific Rim. That same year, the company purchased the Ontario, Canada-based Occupational and Environmental Health Laboratory.

Galson Laboratories was acquired by SGS in August 2014.

== Product offerings ==
Galson Laboratories offers analytical laboratory testing services. The company rents industrial hygiene equipment directly to customers. It also offers air and sample analysis and lab services.

== Major projects ==
In 2007, Galson conducted a study finding dangerous amounts of lead in household enamel paint samples.

In 2008, Galson tested wooden playground equipment at the Lake Placid Elementary school, finding high levels of arsenic.

In 2010, Galson did heavy work related to the Deepwater Horizon oil spill. It sent out 2,500 test kits to test the air quality in the aftermath of the spill.
