= Kevin Bampton =

British businessman

Kevin Bampton is the current Chief Executive Officer of the British Occupational Hygiene Society. He was formerly Head of the Law Schools at the University of Derby and De Montfort University. He is a member of the Board for the Council for Work and Health and Chair of the British Standards Institute's Health and Safety Management Committee.

== Biography ==
Bampton was born in July, 1967 in Kenya to a British father and an Indian mother of Gujarati descent. He attended the University of Birmingham from 1985 to 1988 and obtained an LLB in Law. He worked as a litigation assistant in financial services in Holborn in London and then moved to the British Foreign Office as a legal education advisor for the British Council. During this time he worked in Poland, Botswana, Tanzania and Zimbabwe. Following this he worked for the Political Affairs Department of the United Nations in Malawi during the 1994 elections after the end of the Hastings Banda government, seconded as Secretary to the Constitution Committee.

He then returned to work as consultant legal adviser for the Overseas Development Administration of the Foreign Office, producing an extensive guidance document "Law, Good Governance and Development," described by Professor Stephen Toope, as "the most comprehensive and helpful justification for legal and judicial reform"

He left the Civil Service and became a research fellow within the department of government at Leeds University, and then in 1996, he joined the University of Derby as a lecturer in Law on the University's single Law Course within the school of business, becoming head of law subjects in 2003. He taught Public Law as well as Medical Law and International Law. Much of his research, rather than being concentrated around the publication of academic articles, was around drafting and writing legislation and of various constitutions such as in Malawi.

Alongside his teaching he took part in various external projects for the European Commission, The World Bank as well as the University of Nottingham advising on primary care within prison education. He served as a strategic advisor for the Police Federation of England and Wales and as an independent scrutineer for the Crown Prosecution Service, and consulted to various security and intelligence agencies such as Border Force. In 2007 he became Head of the School of Law and Criminology and in 2015 was made Professor of Law and founded the International Policing and Justice Institute at the University. In this he worked on the training and accreditation of the Police in Malaysia, Qatar and Dubai and gave lectures in Bangladesh and undertook partnership visits to India. Internationally he served as an advisor to the judiciary of Nigeria and visited Switzerland and New York for conferences surrounding the development and implementation of the Modern Slavery Act 2015.

In 2017 Bampton moved to become Head of the Law School, and Professor of Public Law, at De Montfort University.

In 2020 he moved from academia to become the Chief Executive of the British Occupational Hygiene Society.
