= Hierarchy of hazard controls =

System used in industry to eliminate or minimize exposure to hazards

Hazard control methods at the top of the graphic are potentially more effective and protective than those at the bottom. Following this hierarchy of controls normally leads to the implementation of inherently safer systems, where the risk of illness or injury has been substantially reduced.

Hierarchy of hazard control is a system used in industry to prioritize possible interventions to minimize or eliminate exposure to hazards. It is a widely accepted system promoted by numerous safety organizations. This concept is taught to managers in industry, to be promoted as standard practice in the workplace. It has also been used to inform public policy, in fields such as road safety. Various illustrations are used to depict this system, most commonly a triangle.

The hazard controls in the hierarchy are, in order of decreasing priority:

- Elimination
- Substitution
- Engineering controls
- Administrative controls
- Personal protective equipment

The system is not based on evidence about effectiveness but based on If elimination of the hazard is possible, it frees workers of being aware of the hazard and protecting themselves. Substitution has less priority than elimination because the substitute can possibly also come with a hazard. Engineering controls depend on a well-functioning system and human behaviour. Administrative controls and personal protective equipment are always dependent on human behavior which makes these controls less reliable.

== History ==
The NIOSH TB guide describes an early version of the Hierarchy of Controls (On Wikisource)

The hierarchy of hazard controls emerged from multiple different practices that sought to rank protective measures by their reliability. Safety literature in the beginning increasingly distinguished between controls that acted directly on a hazard or controls that depended on the workers actions. These were separated into actions that removed the hazard at its source and that separated people from the hazard. These actions came to be treated as more dependable than rules, warnings, or protective gear alone. This approach reflected a shift in twentieth century safety practice toward systematic proactive prevention rather than waiting for an accident or incident to occur.

This ordering reflected both practical experience and accident prevention research. Controls near the top of the hierarchy tend to remain in place once designed into a process or facility. They usually do not require workers to remember a rule every time a task is performed. Administrative controls and personal protective equipment can reduce risk, but their effectiveness often depends on training, supervision, availability of equipment, correct fit, consistent use, and enforcement over time. For that reason, agencies and professional organizations increasingly presented the hierarchy as a general principle for selecting the most reliable feasible control, rather than as a rigid rule requiring one category in every circumstance.

The concept expanded further through the development of Prevention through Design, a NIOSH initiative launched in 2007. Prevention through Design encouraged engineers, architects, manufacturers, and employers to address hazards during planning, design, procurement, and redesign rather than after a system had already been built. In this setting, the hierarchy became a design principle as much as a workplace control framework. Eliminating a hazard during design could involve selecting a safer chemical, changing equipment layout, automating a dangerous task, or redesigning access to reduce fall exposure. The hierarchy therefore came to serve not only as a tool for evaluating existing hazards, but also as a method for integrating safety into the life cycle of facilities, equipment, and work systems.

This systematic review was able to help influence the public health and infection control standards as well. An example is in health care setting the control guidance issued by the CDC takes on a systematic approach. They may have different categories as they only have three when compared to five but the underlying influence is still present. This reasoning and response has also been appearing in discussions about laboratory safety, our responses to pandemics, and overall patient safety. This has caused focus to feeling systems in place and having levels to those responses are becoming more dependable than individual action.

Hierarchy of hazards has many different names and styles across various industries. Even with all the changes the influence on having a systematic approach in place has changed every industry's practice. The central idea has always remained the same with preventive measures that remove, reduce, or separate people away from the danger. This has made one of the most solid frameworks in occupational safety and health that is looked back and leaned upon even till today.

== Components of the hierarchy ==
=== Elimination ===
Physical removal of the hazard is the most effective hazard control. For example, if employees must work high above the ground, the hazard can be eliminated by moving the piece they are working on to ground level to eliminate the need to work at heights. However, often elimination of the hazard is not possible because the task explicitly involves handling a hazardous agent. For example, construction professionals cannot remove the danger of asbestos when handling the hazardous agent is the core of the task.

=== Substitution ===
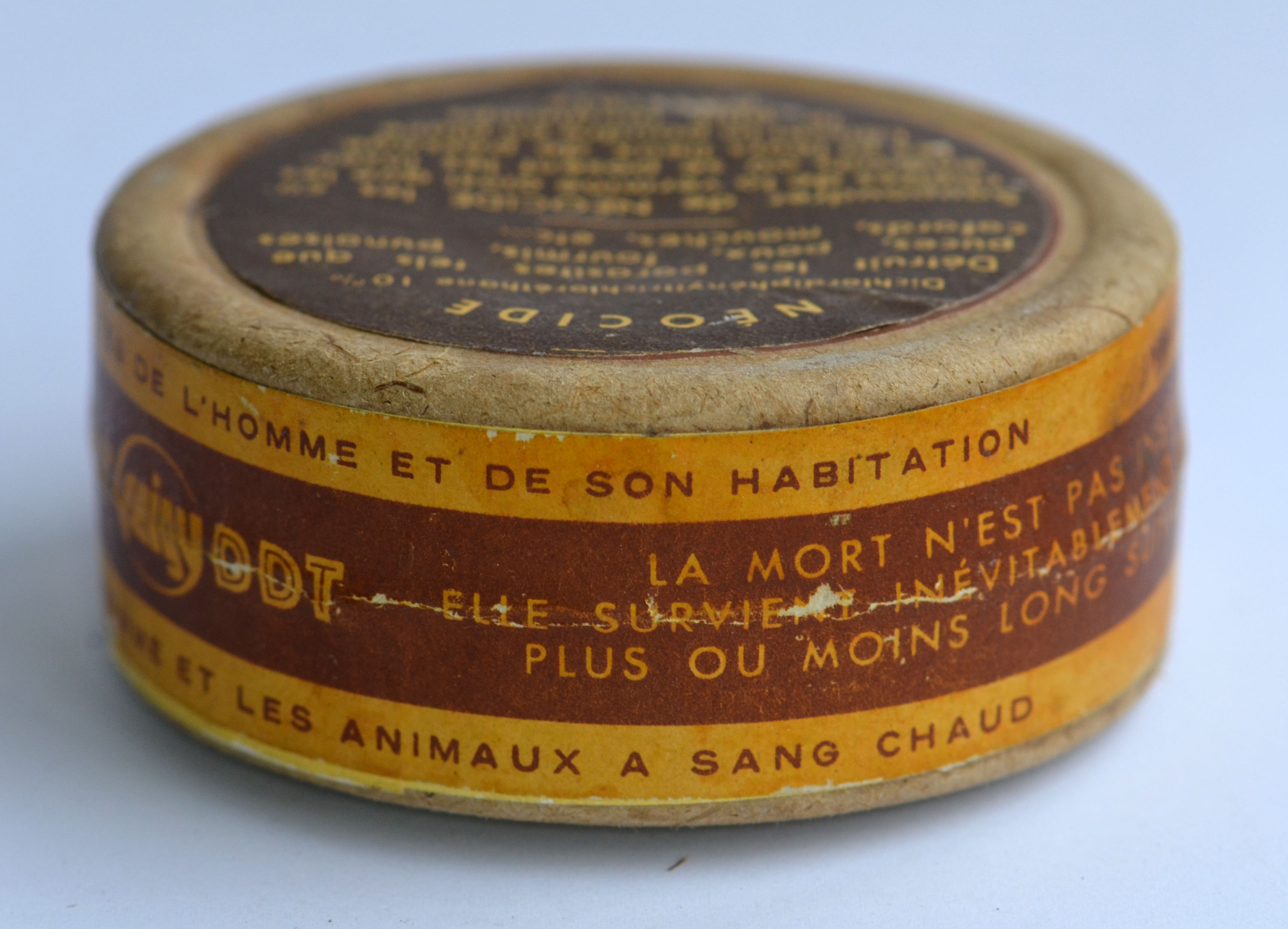
This pesticide contains DDT; an effective substitution would be to replace it with a green pesticide.

Substitution, the second most effective hazard control, involves replacing something that produces a hazard with something that does not produce a hazard or produces a lesser hazard. However, to be an effective control, the new product must not produce unintended consequences. For example, if a product can be purchased with a larger particle size, the smaller product may effectively be substituted with the larger product due to airborne dust having the possibility of being hazardous.

=== Engineering controls ===
The third most effective means of controlling hazards is engineered controls. These do not eliminate hazards, but rather isolate people from hazards. Capital costs of engineered controls tend to be higher than less effective controls in the hierarchy, however they may reduce future costs. A main part of Engineering controls, "Enclosure and isolation," creates a physical barrier between personnel and hazards, such as using remotely controlled equipment. As an example, Fume hoods can remove airborne contaminants as a means of engineered control.

=== Administrative controls ===
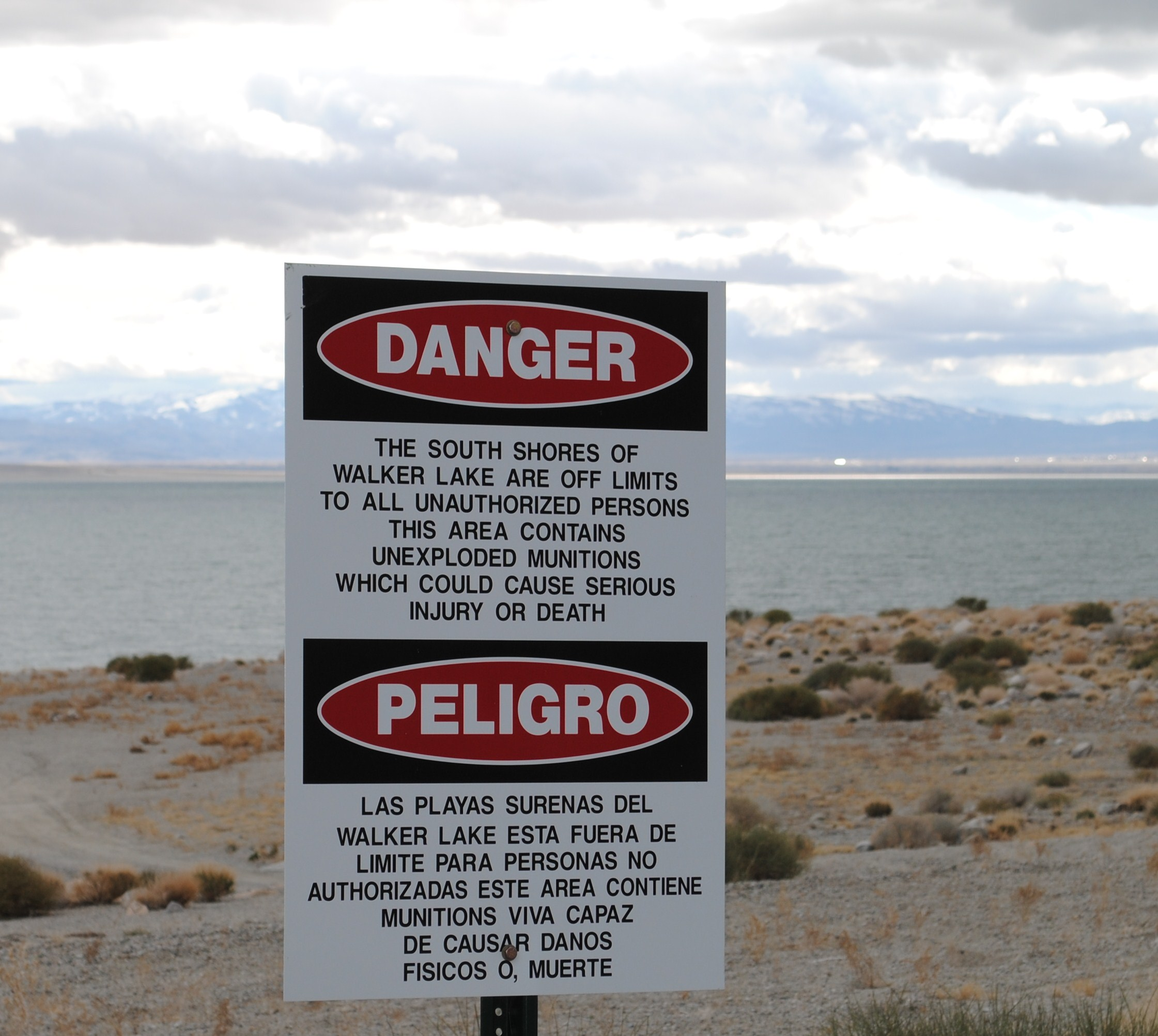
This sign warns people that there are explosives in Walker Lake; however, it cannot prevent people from swimming in it.

Administrative controls are changes to the way people work. Examples of administrative controls include procedure changes, employee training, and installation of signs and warning labels, such as those in the Workplace Hazardous Materials Information System.Administrative controls do not remove hazards, but limit or prevent people's exposure to the hazards, such as completing road construction at night when fewer people are driving.

=== Personal protective equipment ===
Personal protective equipment (PPE) includes gloves, Nomex clothing, overalls, Tyvek suits, respirators, hard hats, safety glasses, high-visibility clothing, and safety footwear. PPE is often the most important means of controlling hazards in fields such as health care and asbestos removal. However, considerable efforts are needed to use PPE effectively, such as training in donning and doffing or testing the equipment. Additionally, some PPE, such as respirators, increase physiological effort to complete a task and, therefore, may require medical examinations to ensure workers can use the PPE without risking their health.

== Role in Prevention through Design ==
The hierarchy of controls is a core component of Prevention through Design, the concept of applying methods to minimize occupational hazards early in the design process. Prevention through Design emphasizes addressing hazards at the top of the hierarchy of controls (mainly through elimination and substitution) at the earliest stages of project development.

== Variations on the NIOSH Control Hierarchy ==
While the control hierarchy shown above is traditionally used in the United States and Canada, other countries or entities may use a slightly different structure. In particular, some add isolation above engineering controls instead of combining the two. The variation of the hierarchy used in the ARECC decision-making framework and process for industrial hygiene (IH) includes modification of the material or procedure to reduce hazards or exposures (sometimes considered a subset of the hazard substitution option but explicitly considered there to mean that the efficacy of the modification for the situation at hand must be confirmed by the user). The ARECC version of the hierarchy also includes warnings as a distinct element to clarify the nature of the warning. In other systems, warnings are sometimes considered part of engineering controls and sometimes part of administrative controls.

== See also ==
- ARECC - Decision-making framework and process used in the field of industrial hygiene (IH) to anticipate and recognize hazards, evaluate exposures, and control and confirm protection from risks
- Prevention through design – Reduction of occupational hazards by early planning in the design process
- Occupational exposure banding – Categorization process for chemical hazards
- Control banding – Approach to promoting OHS
- Job safety analysis – Procedure to integrate safety practices into a particular task
- Normalization of deviance – one reason people stop using effective prevention measures
- Safety engineering – Engineering discipline
