= International Volcanic Health Hazard Network =

The International Volcanic Health Hazard Network (IVHHN) is an organization that provides research and information on the health hazards and impacts of volcanic eruptions. IVHHN work covers a range of research areas including volcanology, toxicology, public health and exposure science, with the goal of determining the health impacts of volcanic emissions and how to protect exposed communities.

== Purpose ==
According to the IVHHN website, the main aims of IVHHN are to:

Improve Communication

- Provide a forum for discussion and networking in relation to volcanic health issues, through hosting workshops, maintaining an up-to-date website and through social media.
- Produce and widely disseminate evidence-based i) public health and protection information; ii) scientific protocols on volcanic ash collection and analysis.

Promote Research

- Promote the expansion of research and encourage the systematic, robust collection and analysis of geologic and medical data to evaluate the health hazards of volcanic eruptions.
- Collate scientific literature on the health hazards of eruptions from volcanoes world-wide.

Instigate Collaboration

- Develop new collaborative, multidisciplinary links between academics and medical practitioners, emergency managers, civil protection and other non-academic entities.
- Work directly with governmental and non-governmental organizations to help prepare for future eruptions and to advise on evaluation of potential health impacts during eruptions.

== Public information products ==
IVHHN has created a range of evidence-based audio-visual and printable products on the health hazards of volcanic emissions and community protection, for the general public and humanitarian agencies, which can be distributed at the onset of new eruptions. These include:

Videos

1. Life with Ash – Accounts from the 2010 Merapi Eruption. This film shares the experiences of communities living near Merapi volcano, Indonesia and how they coped with the volcanic ash which fell during the 2010 explosive eruption. The film aims to help people learn about eruptions and what it is like to experience ashfall. IVHHN hopes that this will help people to be better prepared for future eruptions.
2. How to protect yourself from breathing volcanic ash. This video is about how to protect yourself from breathing volcanic ash. The information in this video can also be downloaded as a pamphlet.
3. How to fit a facemask. This video is about how to fit a facemask, to reduce exposure to particles of volcanic ash in the air. The information is also suitable for other kinds of particle exposures (e.g., wildfire smoke and urban air pollution). The information in this video can also be downloaded as a leaflet.

Printable Products

1. The Health Hazards of Volcanic Ash - A guide for the public. This pamphlet is available in nine languages.
2. Guidelines on Preparedness Before, During and After an Ashfall. This pamphlet is available in nine languages.
3. How to protect yourself from breathing volcanic ash pamphlet. This pamphlet is currently only available in English but Spanish and Bahasa text versions can be found at: www.ivhhn.org/ash-protection.
4. Ash Protection poster. Currently available in English and Spanish.
5. Fitting a facemask leaflet. The How to Fit a Facemask leaflet is designed to be handed out by agencies, along with facemasks. It is currently available in English and Spanish.

The IVHHN website also hosts a set of scientific protocols for the collection and analysis of volcanic ash, and a comprehensive library of academic papers and books published on the health hazards and impacts of volcanic eruptions.

== About IVHHN ==
IVHHN was founded in 2003 by its director, Claire Horwell, a Professor at Durham University. The network is a Commission of the International Association of Volcanology and Chemistry of the Earth's Interior (IAVCEI). IVHHN advises governmental agencies on preparing communities for eruptions and works closely with humanitarian agencies such as the Pan American Health Organization. IVHHN also administers the Hawaii Interagency Vog Dashboard, an online portal for information about volcanic emissions from Kilauea volcano. IVHHN was cited, by Forbes Magazine, as being an excellent source of information during the 2018 eruption crisis at Kilauea volcano, Hawaii.
