= Job safety analysis =

Procedure to integrate safety practices into a particular task

A Job Safety Analysis (JSA) is a systematic process used to incorporate established safety and health principles into specific job tasks or operations. The primary purpose of a JSA is to identify potential hazards associated with a task and to develop procedures to eliminate or reduce those risks. JSA is used to identify hazards before work begins and to implement measures that reduce the likelihood of workplace injuries and illnesses. It is also a core element of broader occupational safety and health programs that emphasize proactive hazard identification and risk control.

The process is also referred to as: Job Hazard Analysis: (JHA), "Hazardous Task Analysis" (HTA), or "Job Hazard Breakdown". In this context, the terms "job" and "task" are often used interchangeably to describe a specific work assignment.Examples of such assignments include operating machinery, using fire suppression equipment, or performing vehicle maintenance, each of which may involve distinct hazards that can be identified and controlled through analysis.

A JSA supports the identification and implementation of appropriate control measures, including engineering controls, administrative changes to work procedures, and the use of Personal protective equipment. It is generally applied as a continuous process rather than a one-time activity, allowing hazards to be reassessed as workplace conditions, equipment, or processes change.

== Purpose and Applications ==
Job safety analysis is used to identify hazards associated with specific tasks and to establish controls before work is performed. By breaking tasks into steps and evaluating each for potential risk, JSAs support the prevention of workplace injuries and illnesses.

JSAs are commonly applied in industries such as construction, manufacturing, maintenance, and healthcare, particularly for high-risk or non-routine tasks. They are also used as training tools and as part of occupational safety and health management systems to improve hazard awareness and standardize safe work practices.

== Terminology and definitions ==
Workplace hazard categories

Workplace hazards can be allocated to six categories:

- Safety hazards: Examples: spills, working from heights, confined spaces
- Biological hazards: Examples; bodily fluids, animal droppings, pathogens
- Physical hazards: Examples: radiation, extreme temperatures, loud noises
- Ergonomic hazards: Examples: awkward postures, incorrect lifting, vibration
- Chemical hazards: Examples: vapors and fumes, pesticides, flammable liquids
- Work organization hazards: Examples: workload demands, job stress, lack of respect

Mechanism of injury

Mechanism of injury (MOI) is the means by which an injury occurs. It is important because in the absence of an MOI there is no hazard. Common mechanisms of injury are "slips, trips and falls", for example:

- Hazard: a tool bag obstructing a walkway (the tool bag of itself would not be a hazard, the bad placement is necessary to make it a hazard)
- Mechanism of injury: tripping over tool bag, falling onto hard surface.
- Injury: bone fracture

Other common mechanisms of injury include:

- Struck against or by
- Contact with or by
- Caught in, on, by or between
- Exposure to
- Fall to same or lower level

Likelihood

Likelihood is how often an event is reasonably and realistically expected to occur in a given time, and may be expressed as a probability, frequency or percentage.

Consequence

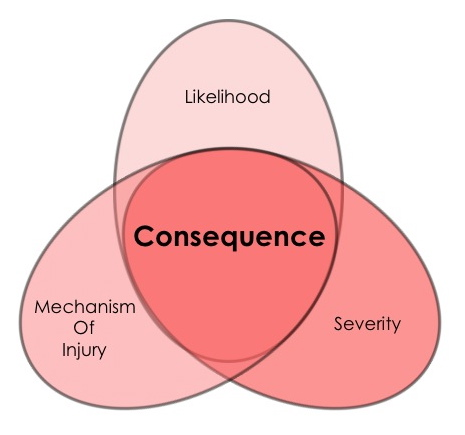
Consequence diagram

Consequence is the outcome of an event expressed qualitatively or quantitatively, being a loss, injury, disadvantage or gain. There may be a range of possible outcomes associated with an event.

Consequence is the severity of the injury or harm that can be reasonably and realistically expected from exposure to the mechanism of injury of the hazard being rated. An implemented control may affect the severity of the injury, but it has no effect on the way the injury occurred. Therefore, when rating risk, the consequence remains the same for both the initial rating and the residual rating. People inherently tend to overestimate severity of consequence when rating risk, but the rating should be both reasonable and realistic.

Risk

Risk is the combination of likelihood and consequence. The risk at hand ties directly into the likelihood and severity of an incident.

Risk authority

The risk authority is the organizational level of the person authorized to accept a specified level of risk. For example, different levels of risk authorities may be assigned as follows:

Risk level	Risk authority
Low risk	Supervisor
Moderate risk	Superintendent
Significant risk	Manager
High risk	Unacceptable without mitigation

"As low as reasonably practicable" (ALARP)

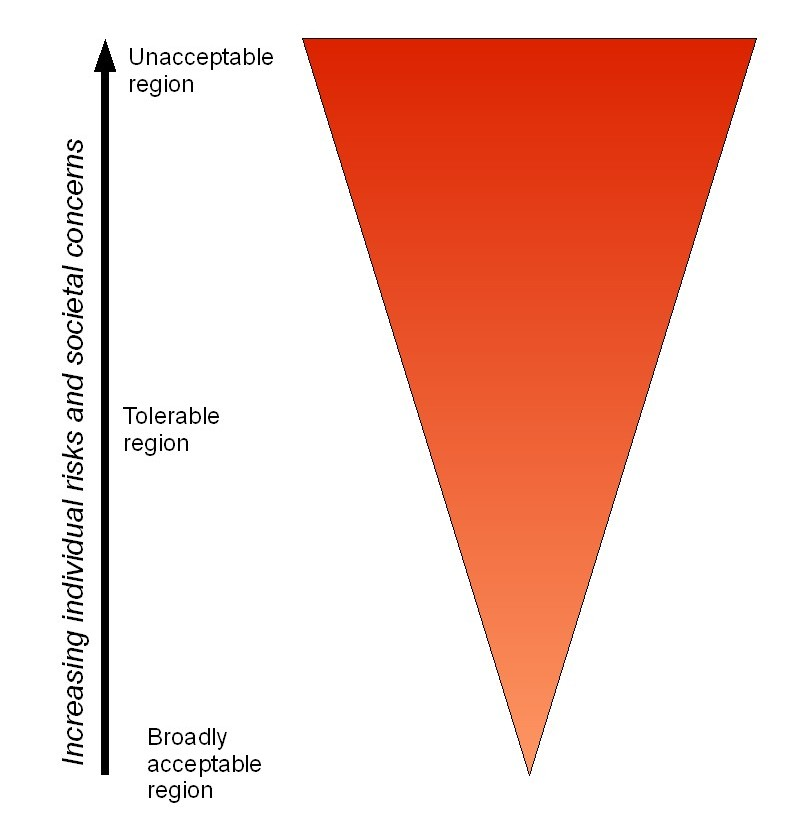
"As low as reasonably practicable" (ALARP) carrot diagram

As low as reasonably practicable when applied to job safety analysis means that it is not necessary to reduce risk beyond the point where the cost of further control becomes disproportionate to any achievable safety benefit. The "ALARA" acronym ("As low as reasonably achievable") is also in common usage.

Reasonably practicable

In relation to a duty to ensure health and safety, reasonably practicable means that which is, or was at a particular time, reasonably able to be done to ensure health and safety, taking into account and weighing up all relevant matters including:

- The likelihood of the hazard or the risk concerned occurring
- The degree of harm that might result from the hazard or the risk
- What the person concerned knows, or ought reasonably to know, about the hazard or risk, and about the ways of eliminating or minimizing the risk
- The availability and suitability of ways to eliminate or minimize the risk
- After assessing the extent of the risk and the available ways of eliminating or minimizing the risk, the cost associated with available ways of eliminating or minimizing the risk, including whether the cost is grossly disproportionate to the expected reduction of risk

Work process
The way in which work is performed is called the work process. This entails all actions taken to do a specific role in the workplace.

PEPE

PEPE is used to assist in identifying hazards. It is an acronym for the four elements that are present in every task of the work process:

- Process,
- Environment,
- People,
- EMT, which is itself an acronym for 'equipment, materials and tools'.

Process

In this context, process is about procedures, standards, legislation, safe work instructions, permits and permit systems, risk assessments and policies. Key factors for effective process are that the relevant components are in place, easy to follow and regularly reviewed and updated.

Environmental hazards

People may be exposed to issues related to:

- Access and egress
- Obstructions
- Weather
- Dust, heat, cold, noise
- Darkness
- Contaminants
- Isolated workers
- Other workers

Personnel hazards

To assist people to be safe in their workplace they need to be provided with sufficient information, training, instructions and supervision. People may be:

- Untrained
- Not yet competent
- Uncertified
- Inexperienced
- Unsupervised
- Affected by alcohol or other drugs
- Fatigued
- Inadequately instructed
- Suffering from stress from home life or workplace bullying
- Have a poor attitude to, or refuse to follow procedures

Equipment, materials and tools

The right equipment, materials and tools must be selected for the task, and incorrect selections may be hazardous in themselves.

- The equipment, materials and/or tools may be hazardous, e.g. sharp, hot, vibrating, heavy, fragile, contain pinch points, a hazardous substance containing hydrocarbons, acids, alkalis, glues, solvents, asbestos, et cetera
- There may be a need for isolating personnel from energy sources such as electricity, hydraulic, pneumatic, radiation and gravitational sources
- Are the equipment, materials, and tools in date? Does it require certification and/or calibration, tested and tagged?
- Obstructions should be kept out of walkways and leads and hoses suspended?

== Hazard controls ==
Controls are the barriers between people and/or assets and the hazards. Controls can also be thought of as "guardrails" that prevent negative impacts from occurring.

- A hard control provides a physical barrier between the person and the hazard. Hard controls include machine guards, restraint equipment, fencing/barricading.
- A soft control does not provide a physical barrier between the person and the hazard. Soft controls include signage, procedures, permits, verbal instructions etc.

=== Control effectiveness criteria ===
Controls measures identified through a JSA are typically selected using the Hierarchy of hazard controls, which prioritizes eliminating hazards over relying on less effective measures such as personal protective equipment. This approach supports more effective and sustainable risk reduction strategies. The effectiveness of a control is measured by its ability to reduce the likelihood of a hazard causing injury or damage. A control is either effective or not.

To gauge this effectiveness several control criteria are used, which:

- Address the relevant aspects of process, environment, people, and equipment, materials and tools (PEPE),
- Reduce likelihood to as low as reasonably practicable (ALARP),
- Selected hard controls in preference to soft controls, and
- Contain a 'doing word'.

There is no commonly used mathematical way in which multiple controls for a single hazard can be combined to give a score that meets an organizations acceptable risk level. In instances where the residual risk is greater than the organizations acceptable risk level, consultation with the organizations relevant risk authority should occur.

=== Hierarchy of controls ===
Hierarchy of controls

Hierarchy of control is a system used in industry to minimize or eliminate exposure to hazards. It is a widely accepted system promoted by numerous safety organizations. This concept is taught to managers in industry, to be promoted as a standard practice in the workplace. Various illustrations are used to depict this system, most commonly a triangle.

The hierarchy of hazard controls are, in descending order of effectiveness: Elimination, substitution, engineering controls, administrative controls, and personal protective equipment.

== Limitations ==
While job safety analysis is widely used to identify and control hazards, it has several limitations. The effectiveness of a JSA depends on the knowledge and experience of those conducting the analysis, and hazards may be overlooked if tasks are not fully evaluated.

JSAs may also be less effective in addressing long-term or less obvious exposures, such as those related to chronic health risk. In addition, analyses can become outdated if they are not regularly reviewed and updated to reflect changes in equipment, processes, or work conditions.

== Scope of application ==
A job safety analysis is a documented risk assessment developed when company policy directs employees to do so. Workplace hazard identification and an assessment of those hazards may be required before every job.

Analyses are usually developed when directed to do so by a supervisor, when indicated by the use of a first tier risk assessment and when a hazard associated with a task has a likelihood rating of 'possible' or greater.

Generally, high consequence, high likelihood task hazards are addressed by way of a job safety analysis. These may include, but are not limited to, those with a history of, or potential for, injury, harm or damage such as those involving:

- Fire, chemicals or a toxic or oxygen deficient atmosphere
- Tasks carried out in new environments
- Rarely performed tasks
- Tasks that may impact on the integrity or output of a processing system

It is important that employees understand that it is not the JSA form that will keep them safe on the job, but rather the process it represents. It is of little value to identify hazards and devise controls if the controls are not put in place. Workers should never be tempted to "sign on" the bottom of a JSA without first reading and understanding it.

JSAs are quasi-legal documents and are often used in incident investigations and court cases.

== Structure of a Job Safety Analysis ==
A Job Safety Analysis (JSA) is typically developed through collaborative process involving workers who perform the task, along with Supervisors and Safety personnel. Involving individuals with direct task experience improves hazard recognition and supports the development of practical effective of control measures.

Previously completed JSAs may be used as references for similar work activities; however, each analysis should be reviewed to ensure that current site conditions, equipment, and environmental factors are adequately addressed.

JSAs are commonly documented in a standardized tabular format. The most basic structure consists of three columns:

- Job Step - a sequential breakdown of the task into observable actions
- Hazard - potential source of injury, illness, damage, or loss associated with each step
- Control - measures implemented to eliminate or reduce identified hazards

More detailed formats may include additional columns, such as risk ratings, responsible personnel, required permits, or verification steps, depending on organizational practices.

A "hazard" is generally defined as any sources or situation with the potential to cause harm to personnel, property, or the environment. A "control" refers to any measure used to eliminate or reduce a hazard.

== Methodology ==
A job safety analysis typically follows a structured process that includes selecting the task, breaking it into steps, identifying hazards, and implementing controls to reduce risk. A comprehensive job safety analysis typically follows a structured process:

1. Select the job
  - Prioritize task with high injury potential, severity, or frequency.
2. Break the job into steps
  - Divide the job into sequential, observable actions.
3. Identify hazards
  - Evaluate each step for potential hazards, including:
    - Physical (noise, heat, radiation)
    - Chemical (vapors, dust, fumes)
    - Biological (pathogens)
    - Ergonomic (repetition, force, posture)
    - Psychosocial and organizational factors.
4. Assess risk
  - Determine risk by evaluating likelihood and severity of harm.
5. Implement controls
  - Apply the hierarchy of controls:
    1. Elimination
    2. Substitution
    3. Engineering controls
    4. Administrative controls
    5. Personal protective equipment (PPE)
6. Review and update
  - The JSA should be reviewed periodically and updated when changes occur in equipment, processes, or work conditions. Continuous review ensures that hazards are effectively managed over time.

== Example ==
The following simplified example illustrates a job safety analysis for scaffolding and welding tasks:

Job	Hazard	Control
Erecting scaffolding	Falling scaffolding components	Barricade work area while erecting and dismantling scaffolding
Erecting scaffolding	Working at height	Verify scaffolder competence Inspect scaffold components and structure Tag scaffolding after approval Wear appropriate protective equipment (harness, hard hats, safety footwear etc.); Tether tools
Welding	Electrical current	Wear insulated gloves Inspect cables, connections and tools before use
Welding	Welding fumes	Ventilate using intrinsically safe fume extraction fans Wear respiratory protection when appropriate
Welding	Welding arc	Wear welding helmet with eye protection, fire resistant overalls, welding gloves and apron Erect welding screens if appropriate
Welding	Hot weld metal, sparks and slag	Remove all combustibles from work area Lay out fireproof drop cloths. Set up appropriate fire fighting equipment in work area Maintain a fire watch during task plus 30 minutes.
Housekeeping	Obstacles in work area	Maintain a clear path work area Remove unnecessary and vulnerable equipment Display warning signage Barricade danger areas

*Note: This example is provided for illustrative purposes and may vary depending on specific tasks, environments, and organizational practices.

=== Assessing risk levels ===
Some organizations add columns for risk levels. The risk rating of the hazard prior to applying the control is known as the 'inherent risk rating'. The risk rating of the hazard with the control in place is known as the 'residual' risk rating.

Risk, within the occupational health and safety sphere, is defined as the 'effect of uncertainties on objectives'. In the context of rating a risk, it is the correlation of 'likelihood' and 'consequence', where likelihood is a quantitative evaluation of frequency of occurrences over time, and consequence is a qualitative evaluation of both the "Mechanism of Injury" and the reasonable and realistic estimate of "severity of injury".

Example:

There is historical precedent to reasonably and realistically evaluate that the likelihood of an adverse event occurring while operating a hot particle producing tool, (grinder), is "possible", therefore the activity of grinding meets the workplace hazard criteria.

It would also be reasonable and realistic to assume that the mechanism of injury of an eye being struck at high speed with hot metal particles may result in a permanent disability, whether it be the eye of the grinder operator, a crew member or any person passing or working adjacent to, above or below the grinding operation.

The severity of reasonably and realistically expected injury may be blindness. Therefore, grinding warrants a high severity rating.

Wearing eye protection while in the vicinity of grinding operations reduces the likelihood of this adverse event occurring.

If the eye protection was momentarily not used, not fitted correctly or failed and hot high speed particles struck an eye, the expected mechanism of injury (adverse event) has still occurred, hence the consequence rating remains the same for both the inherent and residual consequence rating.

It is accepted that the control may affect the severity of injury, however, the rated consequence remains the same as the effect is not predictable.

One of the known risk rating anomalies is that likelihood and the severity of injury can be scaled, but mechanism of injury cannot be scaled. This is the reason why the mechanism of injury is bundled with severity, to allow a rating to be given. The MoI is an important factor as it suggests the obvious controls.

=== Identifying responsibilities ===
Another column that is often added to a JSA form or worksheet is the Responsible column. The Responsible column is for the name of the individual who will put the particular control in place. Defining who is responsible for actually putting the controls in place that have been identified on the JSA worksheet ensures that an individual is accountable for doing so.

=== Application of the JSA ===
After the JSA worksheet is completed, the work group that is about to perform the task would have a toolbox talk, to discuss the hazards and controls, delegate responsibilities, ensure that all equipment and personal protective equipment described in the JSA are available, that contingencies such as fire fighting are understood, communication channels and hand signals are agreed etc. Then, if everybody in the work group agrees that it is safe to proceed with the task, work can commence.

If at any time during the task circumstances change, then work should be stopped (sometimes called a "time-out for safety"), and the hazards and controls described in the JSA should be reassessed and additional controls used or alternative methods devised. Again, work should only continue when every member of the work group agrees it is safe to do so.

When the task is complete it is often of benefit to have a close-out or "tailgate" meeting, to discuss any lessons learned so that they may be incorporated into the JSA the next time the task is undertaken.
