= Institute of Occupational Medicine =

Independent charity in UK

The Institute of Occupational Medicine (IOM) was founded in 1969 by the National Coal Board (NCB) as an independent charity in Edinburgh, UK and retains its charitable purpose and status today. The "Institute" has a subsidiary, IOM Consulting Limited, which became fully independent in 1990 and now celebrates its 25th year within the IOM Group as an independent consultancy and also the commercial part of the IOM organization. It specializes in asbestos surveys and services, occupational hygiene services, nanotechnology safety, laboratory analysis and expert witness consulting services. IOM is therefore one of the UK's major independent "not for profit" centres of science in the fields of environmental health, occupational hygiene and occupational safety.

== Coal and pneumoconiosis ==
The IOM was set up by Dr John Rogan, the chief medical officer of the NCB, who had initiated the Pneumoconiosis Field Research (PFR), persuaded the then chairman, Lord Robens, to found a scientific institute to take over the running of this research. The original senior members of staff, under Rogan, were Henry Walton, deputy director and head of Environment Branch, Dr Michael Jacobsen, head of statistics and Dr David Muir, head of Medical Branch.

The early history of the IOM is inextricably bound up with the NCB and the PFR. The PFR had started in the early 1950s with the objective of determining how much and what types of coal dust caused pneumoconiosis and what airborne dust concentrations should be maintained in order to prevent miners from becoming disabled by the air they breathed. These ambitious and clear objectives were remarkably far-sighted, implying a requirement to measure both exposure to airborne dust and health outcomes in a large cohort of miners over a prolonged period, and to use these quantitative data to set protective health standards in the industry. 50,000 coalminers were eventually recruited into the study from 25 collieries representative of conditions across Britain.

The early work involved measuring dust exposure by counting the number of particles collected from the air by sampling devices. A substantial advance was achieved with the measurement of exposure by weighing the dust collected by MRE 113a respirable dust samplers, which were invented specifically for the research by Henry Walton and Robert Hamilton.

The first results from the PFR were reported in 1970 in the scientific journal Nature. The research underpinned the recommendations for more stringent airborne dust standards in British coalmines and the PFR was ultimately used as the basis for many national dust standards around the world. IOM's research in coal mining continued until about 1990, with many important scientific papers on respiratory diseases amongst miners having been published. In 1985, an important association between risk of pathological emphysema and dust exposure was demonstrated, leading ultimately to recognition of this disease as a quantifiable risk of coal mining. Recent analysis of the mortality of a subset of the miners originally studied has found an association between the risk of lung cancer and quartz exposure, and raised mortality from chronic lung disease and pneumoconiosis associated with increasing dust exposure.

In the 1980s the IOM's epidemiological expertise was used in three original studies led by Dr Anthony Seaton into the effects of polyvinyl chloride dust, wool dust and shale mining on the lung health of workers. All showed positive associations and the results were used in regulatory standard setting in the UK and United States.

This research into risks from inhaling dusts remains an important part of the IOM's research. The occupational exposure limits for crystalline silica continue to be a major international concern and from its previous research IOM has been able to define an exposure-response relationship for crystalline silica with unusual precision. This work demonstrated the need for very low limits on exposure to airborne crystalline silica because of the high risk of disease from even relatively brief exposures to high airborne concentrations.

IOM studies have defined the relationships between decreases in lung function and dust concentrations amongst coal miners. These studies showed that dust control sufficient to prevent pneumoconiosis would reduce substantially the risks of impairment of lung function. However, an important question was whether these risks could be extrapolated to other occupational insoluble dusts. By developing and validating mathematical models of accumulated lung dust burden and resulting inflammation, IOM research has shown that the toxicity of several insoluble dusts of different compositions can be predicted from their surface area.

== Asbestos and other mineral fibres ==
In 1971, Dr John MG Davies was recruited from Cambridge University to head a new Pathology Branch at IOM, and to continue his research into asbestos-related diseases. An extensive programme of research on the toxicology of fibres has shown that persistence of some asbestos fibres in the lung as a result of their insolubility was an important determinant of carcinogenicity and fibrogenicity, and that fibre length was also critically important in determining toxicity. This research expanded to consider fibres and other materials introduced as substitutes for asbestos, such as calcium silicate and aramid fibres. From 1990, the Colt Foundation, relevant industries and the Health and Safety Executive supported a programme of laboratory research into the health effects of man-made mineral fibres that helped to clarify the quantitative relationships between health risks and fibre dimensions and biopersistence. This work was awarded the prestigious Bedford Prize by the British Occupational Hygiene Society.

In 1977, Henry Walton and Dr Steve Beckett invented a microscope eyepiece graticule used for counting asbestos fibres. This device was designed to improve the reliability of the measurements and it has since become part of the international standard methodology for fibre measurement. A programme ensued on the measurement of fibrous aerosols such as asbestos, raising important issues in comparability of counts by different laboratories, and leading to the establishment of quality control schemes for asbestos. In 1979 the IOM was appointed by the Health and Safety Executive as the British Central Reference Laboratory for asbestos fibre counting, and the following year the World Health Organization similarly appointed IOM as its central reference laboratory for man-made mineral fibre counting.

From 1985 IOM collaborated with the International Agency for Research on Cancer in a major European epidemiological study of the carcinogenicity of mineral wool fibres. As part of this work IOM helped develop novel methods to estimate retrospectively exposure of workers in the study, ultimately demonstrating that there was no evidence of a carcinogenic effect of these fibres on the lung. IOM scientists also conducted a study of the respiratory health of workers manufacturing Refractory Ceramic Fibre in Europe, showing small though inconsistent effects on respiratory health associated with inhalation of these fibres.

== Workplace exposure, measurement and modelling ==
From its earliest years, IOM has had a tradition of using quantitative exposure measurements to explore links between the working environment and health and has pioneered the development of new methods to measure the concentration of aerosols in ways that are relevant to human biology. The MRE 113A respirable dust sampler developed for use in our pneumoconiosis research was the first landmark and led to greater insight into the causes of this disease. Under Dr Jim Vincent's leadership, an innovative research programme, begun by Dr Trevor Ogden, was aimed at designing new sampling instruments for coarser aerosols. The culmination of this work was the development of the IOM inhalable dust sampler, which has become established as the device of choice for measuring the part of an aerosol that penetrates beyond the larynx. IOM scientists played a key role in defining the internationally agreed size fractions of dust relevant to human lung disease, i.e. inhalable, thoracic and respirable.

Research on chemical exposure has more recently focussed on exposure modelling, data management and studies for regulatory risk assessment. Studies in relation to metals, including dermal exposure to nickel, zinc and lead, have been carried out. Work on the measurement of exposure to oil mist aerosol and vapour has been undertaken for offshore oil workers. In collaboration with some of the leading European human exposure scientists, IOM has been developing a new generation exposure model for use in connection with the Registration, Evaluation, Authorisation and Restriction of Chemicals (REACH) Regulations in Europe – the model is known as the Advanced REACH Tool or ART.

IOM scientists have developed a strong interest in the assessment of dermal exposure, leading to the enumeration of new principles of exposure assessment, the development of predictive exposure models, and investigations into dermal exposure under specific working conditions. Estimating historical skin exposures of farmers dipping sheep in pesticide solutions for an epidemiological study proved particularly challenging, but this research demonstrated a strong association between concentrated organophosphate pesticides and neurological symptoms. As a consequence the UK government withdrew these pesticides from the market until safer handling systems were devised. In addition, new sampling instruments to measure dermal exposure to chemicals and new theoretical models to help understand how skin exposure may arise. These instruments and models may in the future help provide more reliable assessments of the risks from chemicals to the skin. IOM scientists are also developing a molded cassette with a 15mm inlet for use as a personal sampling pump to test inhalable dust levels.

Other research at IOM has shown that chronic fatigue is common amongst those who consider their health is affected by pesticides and suggested there was an association between exposure to organophosphates and chronic fatigue symptoms.

== Human sciences and personal protective equipment ==
Early ergonomics research at IOM, particularly under the direction of Tom Leamon, helped to promote greater safety of coal miners and to increase the cost-effectiveness of production. One of the IOM's most important contributions in ergonomics was in machine and system design, work that was passed to the manufacturers and contributed widely to worker safety and efficiency.

Work on human factors and personal protective equipment (PPE) at the IOM started in the early 1970s, with studies of the impact of resistance to breathing caused by respirators, and resulted in guidance criteria that form part of respirator product standards to this day. In the 1980s and 1990s work continued with investigation of the utility of cooling garments such as ice jackets in hot environments, studies of the use and effectiveness of hearing protection, of the effectiveness of respirators in reducing exposure in the workplace, and of heat strain imposed by breathing apparatus. This latter work resulted in the development of permissible work times consistent with safe use of breathing apparatus, standards currently used by the UK Mines Rescue service.

The PPE research has used ergonomic principles to design protective clothing and equipment that impose fewer demands on those required to use them. For example, IOM scientists helped develop improved powered helmet respirators following research that showed existing devices to be heavy, cumbersome, uncomfortable and intrusive.

In the 1990s, on behalf of the UK fire service, studies were carried out of the physiological and ergonomic impacts of breathing apparatus, fire hoods and protective clothing. The studies on fire hoods showed that, contrary to common belief, they did not affect the ability of firefighters to localise sound. This led to a recommendation by the UK Home Office that all fire fighters should routinely be issued with such hoods, advice which is now followed throughout the UK. The IOM has helped to assess Chemical, Biological, Radiological and Nuclear (CBRN) protective clothing for the Home Office, and has recently assisted London Fire Brigade in the ergonomic assessment for selection of new protective clothing.

== Environment and health ==
In the early 1990s, the IOM became involved in a series of projects in the European Framework Programmes for Research and Technological Development that addressed, amongst other things, the public health effects of air pollution from fossil fuel power plant. These first steps in quantitative environmental Health Impact Assessment (HIA) led over time to further work, including involvement in the cost-benefit analysis of the European Commission's Clean Air for Europe (CAFE) programme, followed by some ground-breaking work on the use of life table methods to estimate the impacts of air pollution on mortality. This HIA work has expanded into health effects of other occupational and environmental pollutants and into public health more generally, leading to the establishment of the IOM's Centre for Health Impact Assessment.

IOM scientists have investigated exposure of bystanders living or working near to fields that have been sprayed with pesticides and have undertaken a study to model the exposure of the British population to selected pesticides from food and other sources. This work demonstrated that although it is likely that most people are exposed to low levels of a wide variety of pesticide compounds it is unlikely that such exposure would have measurable effects on the health of the population.

In 1995 the Soufriere Hills volcano on the Caribbean island of Montserrat erupted, spewing volcanic ash containing large amounts of the crystalline silica mineral cristobalite over the surrounding area. IOM scientists investigated the health of people who lived on the island. In general the exposure of the residents was low, because most people lived well away from the area of highest ash falls, and the ash proved of relatively low toxicity. The studies of the population showed no impairment of the islanders' respiratory health.

Environment and health is now a well-established area of the IOM's work, involving chemical monitoring, laboratory analysis, consultancy, literature reviews and collaborative primary research. It covers exposures to and health effects of a wide range of environmental hazards, including outdoor and indoor air pollution, ionising radiation and electromagnetic fields, dioxins and pesticides.

== Consultancy ==
IOM's research has helped to set standards and inform regulatory processes over the years, and this created the opportunity to offer consultancy services to customers in industry and elsewhere, to help them achieve best practice and comply with the law. Over the years, this advice has often been based on knowledge gained during their research work.

The IOM have provided consultancies to a wide range of customers since the mid-1970s. In the beginning, the main impetus for the work came from Jim Dodgson, who built up occupational hygiene and chemical analysis in Edinburgh and in their regional offices (then in South Wales, the Midlands and Tyne and Wear). Then, as now, a substantial proportion of the work was related to asbestos sampling and analysis in buildings, industrial plant and contaminated land. IOM were amongst the first to introduce asbestos clearance indicators in the UK – ahead of the Health and Safety Executive.

Thirty years ago IOM were already developing their occupational hygiene business in a variety of other directions. Countless surveys of occupational exposures to hazardous gases, liquids, fumes, dusts and fibres have been undertaken. They have advised on control methods for hazardous agents, from elimination or substitution, to organisational changes or the introduction of personal protective equipment. Through the 1980s the consultancy work developed to include ergonomics and occupational medicine. By the time IOM became independent from British Coal in 1990, the consultancy work accounted for about 45% of the work.

The consultancy work grew steadily after independence, increasingly centred on the Edinburgh office. In 1998, IOM expanded this sector of the business and Dr Alastair Robertson was appointed to lead this development. A key objective was to expand geographically, and regional offices were opened in Chesterfield, London and Stafford. By the end of 2008–2009, this type of work had grown over fourfold, accounting for over 70% of the IOM's turnover. The consultancy work now covers the safety of nanoparticles, asbestos management, occupational hygiene, ventilation verification/validation, occupational medicine, stress management, ergonomics, expert witness reports, the general environment and many laboratory analyses. The IOM work for government agencies, universities, the NHS, local authorities, private healthcare providers, large industrial concerns and small businesses, mainly within the UK but there also across the world, from Chile to Kazakhstan, from Zimbabwe to the United States of America and from St Helena to Montserrat.

== Nanomaterials ==
Since 2002, led by Dr Rob Aitken, IOM has pioneered the assessment and management of hazards arising from nanotechnologies. Nanotechnologies are concerned with the development of new materials at the nanometre scale, materials that have novel and exciting properties and applications. Nanomaterials have been the subject of massive financial investment worldwide. However, it has been recognised that they may also represent hazards to the health of workers, consumers or the environment.

Together with partners in the University of Edinburgh, Napier University (group now at Heriot-Watt University, in Edinburgh) and the University of Aberdeen, IOM formed the SnIRC initiative (Safety of nanoparticles Interdisciplinary Research Centre) and with them have embarked on a programme of fundamental research, funded by the European Commission and others, on questions related to toxicity, exposure and risk. The IOM and its partners have published a series of influential reviews on aspects of safe usage including patterns of use, regulation, food, and environment, sponsored by UK Government departments, in order to set UK Government policy in this area. Independently the IOM have published research strategies designed to address the many complex challenges to be faced. IOM now leads a large international study on the toxicology of nanoparticles involving 21 partner organisations from across Europe and the USA.

With UK Government support IOM has established SAFENANO, the most comprehensive free information resource on these issues available today. Using all available information, SAFENANO provides industry with state-of-the-art services in toxicology, exposure and risk assessment to help understand and mitigate potential risks to workers, consumers and the environment. SAFENANO is now Europe's Centre of Excellence on Nanotechnology Hazard and Risk.

The development of new products containing carbon nanotubes has raised concerns that such materials may present risks similar to mineral fibres. Professor Ken Donaldson and others have published data on some of these materials showing similar toxicological responses as to asbestos, implying that exposure to some types of carbon nanotubes could carry similar hazard. While more research is needed on the toxicology and potential exposures to these materials, action has already been taken by regulators to reduce possible risks to workers.

== Singapore office ==
On 3 September 2012, the IOM opened a new research, consulting and services business in Singapore, with support from the Economic Development Board of Singapore, UK Trade and Industry, and Scottish Development International. Its business focus was initially on the safe use of nanomaterials in emerging technologies and occupational hygiene. The key people in the team included Rob Aitken (managing director), Michael Riediker (director of SAFENANO) and Zephan Chan (head of occupational hygiene).

In June 2013, Singapore experienced the worst situation of haze problem in history. IOM Singapore had received several enquiries from clients about good control measures to protect employees in workplaces. IOM Singapore developed a short note to assist Singapore employers in complying with the MOM recommendations by providing further information about good practice.

On 5 November 2021 the Singapore office became independent of the IOM, operating as the Institute of Ergonomics and Hygiene, with Zephan Chan leading the business forward.
