= Occupational hygiene =

Management of workplace health hazards

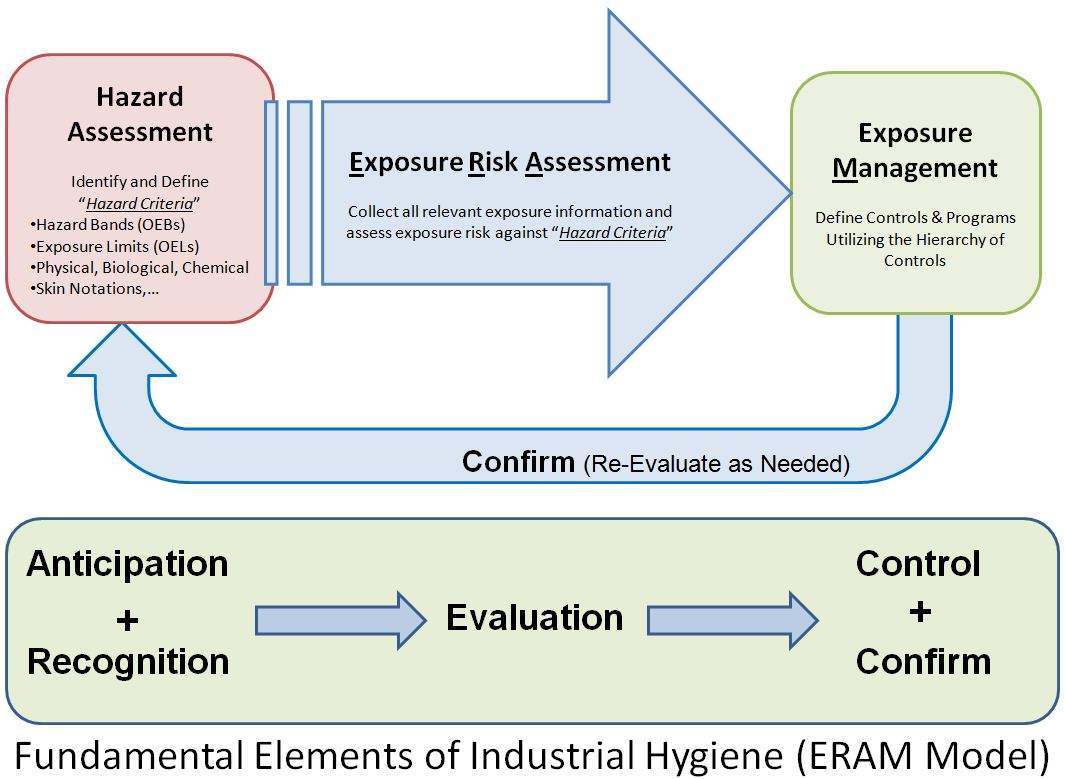
Illustration of Exposure Risk Assessment and Management related to anticipation, recognition, evaluation, control, and confirmation

Occupational hygiene or industrial hygiene (IH) is the anticipation, recognition, evaluation, control, and confirmation (ARECC) of protection from risks associated with exposures to hazards in, or arising from, the workplace that may result in injury, illness, impairment, or affect the well-being of workers and members of the community. These hazards or stressors are typically divided into the categories biological, chemical, physical, ergonomic and psychosocial. The risk of a health effect from a given stressor is a function of the hazard multiplied by the exposure to the individual or group. For chemicals, the hazard can be understood by the dose response profile most often based on toxicological studies or models. Occupational hygienists work closely with toxicologists (see Toxicology) for understanding chemical hazards, physicists (see Physics) for physical hazards, and physicians and microbiologists for biological hazards (see Microbiology, Tropical medicine, Infection). Environmental and occupational hygienists are considered experts in exposure science and exposure risk management. Depending on an individual's type of job, a hygienist will apply their exposure science expertise for the protection of workers, consumers and/or communities.

== The profession of occupational hygienist ==
The British Occupational Hygiene Society (BOHS) defines that "occupational hygiene is about the prevention of ill-health from work, through recognizing, evaluating and controlling the risks". The International Occupational Hygiene Association (IOHA) refers to occupational hygiene as the discipline of anticipating, recognizing, evaluating and controlling health hazards in the working environment with the objective of protecting worker health and well-being and safeguarding the community at large. The term occupational hygiene (used in the UK and Commonwealth countries as well as much of Europe) is synonymous with industrial hygiene (used in the US, Latin America, and other countries that received initial technical support or training from US sources). The term industrial hygiene traditionally stems from industries with construction, mining or manufacturing, and occupational hygiene refers to all types of industry such as those listed for industrial hygiene as well as financial and support services industries and refers to "work", "workplace" and "place of work" in general. Environmental hygiene addresses similar issues to occupational hygiene but is likely to be about broad industry or broad issues affecting the local community, broader society, region or country.

The profession of occupational hygiene uses strict and rigorous scientific methodology and often requires professional judgment based on experience and education in determining the potential for hazardous exposure risks in workplace and environmental studies. These aspects of occupational hygiene can often be referred to as the "art" of occupational hygiene and is used in a similar sense to the "art" of medicine. In fact "occupational hygiene" is both an aspect of preventive medicine and in particular occupational medicine, in that its goal is to prevent industrial disease, using the science of risk management, exposure assessment and industrial safety. Ultimately professionals seek to implement "safe" systems, procedures or methods to be applied in the workplace or to the environment. Prevention of exposure to long working hours has been identified as a focus for occupational hygiene when a landmark United Nations study estimated that this occupational hazard causes an estimated 745,000 occupational fatalities per year worldwide, the largest burden of disease attributed to any single occupational hazard.

Industrial hygiene refers to the science of anticipating, recognizing, evaluating, and controlling workplaces to prevent illness or injuries to the workers. Industrial hygienists use various environmental monitoring and analytical methods to establish how workers are exposed. In turn, they employ techniques such as engineering and work practice controls to control any potential health hazards.

Anticipation involves identifying potential hazards in the workplace before they are introduced. The uncertainty of health hazards ranges from reasonable expectations to mere speculations. However, it implies that the industrial hygienist must understand the nature of changes in the processes, products, environments, and workforces of the workplaces and how they can affect workers' well-being.

Recognition of engineering, work practice, and administrative controls are the primary means of reducing the workers` exposure to occupational hazards. Timely recognition of hazards minimizes the workers' exposure to the hazards by removing or reducing the hazard's source or isolating the workers from the hazards.

Evaluation of a worksite is a significant step that helps the industrial hygienists establish jobs and worksites that are a potential source of problems. During the evaluation, the industrial hygienist measures and identifies the problem tasks, exposures, and tasks. The most effective worksites assessment includes all the jobs, work activities, and operations. The industrial hygienists inspect research and evaluations of how given physical or chemical hazards affect the workers' health. If the workplace contains a health hazard, the industrial hygienist recommends appropriate corrective actions.

Control measures include removing toxic chemicals and replacing harmful toxic materials with less hazardous ones. It also involves confining work operations or enclosing work processes and installing general and local ventilation systems. Controls change how the task is performed. Some of the basic work practice controls include: following the laid procedures to reduce exposures while at the workplace, inspecting and maintaining processes regularly, and implementing reasonable workplace procedures.

== History ==
The industrial hygiene profession gained respectability back in 1700 when Bernardino Ramazzini published a comprehensive book on industrial medicine. The book was written in Italian and was known as De Morbis Artificum Diatriba, meaning “The Diseases of Workmen”. The book detailed the accurate description of the occupational diseases that most of his time workers suffered from. Ramazzini was critical to the industrial hygiene profession's future because he asserted that occupational diseases should be studied in the workplace environment and not in hospital wards.

Industrial hygiene in the United States started taking shape in the early 20th century. There before, many workers risked their lives daily to work in industrial settings such as manufacturing, mills, constructions, and mines. Currently, the statistics on work safety are usually measured by the number of injuries and deaths yearly. Before the 20th century, these kinds of statistics were hard to come by because it appeared no one cared enough to make tracking of the job injuries and deaths a priority.

Industrial hygiene received another boost in the early 20th century when Alice Hamilton led an effort to improve industrial hygiene. She began by observing industrial conditions first and then startled mine owners, factory managers, and other state officials with evidence that there was a correlation between workers' illnesses and their exposure to chemical toxins. She presented definitive proposals for eliminating unhealthful working conditions. As a result, the US federal government also began investigating health conditions in the industry. In 1911, the states passed the first workers' compensation laws.

== The social role of occupational hygiene ==
Occupational hygienists have been involved historically with changing the perception of society about the nature and extent of hazards and preventing exposures in the workplace and communities. Many occupational hygienists work day-to-day with industrial situations that require control or improvement to the workplace situation. However larger social issues affecting whole industries have occurred in the past e.g. since 1900, asbestos exposures that have affected the lives of tens of thousands of people. Occupational hygienists have become more engaged in understanding and managing exposure risks to consumers from products with regulations such as REACh (Registration, Evaluation, Authorisation and Restriction of Chemicals) enacted in 2006.

More recent issues affecting broader society are, for example in 1976, Legionnaires' disease or legionellosis. More recently again in the 1990s, radon, and in the 2000s, the effects of mold from indoor air quality situations in the home and at work. In the later part of the 2000s, concern has been raised about the health effects of nanoparticles.

Many of these issues have required the coordination of medical and paraprofessionals in detecting and then characterizing the nature of the issue, both in terms of the hazard and in terms of the risk to the workplace and ultimately to society. This has involved occupational hygienists in research, collection of data and development of suitable and satisfactory control methodologies.

== General activities ==
The occupational hygienist may be involved with the assessment and control of physical, chemical, biological or environmental hazards in the workplace or community that could cause injury or disease. Physical hazards may include noise, temperature extremes, illumination extremes, ionizing or non-ionizing radiation, and ergonomics. Chemical hazards related to dangerous goods or hazardous substances are frequently investigated by occupational hygienists. Other related areas including indoor air quality (IAQ) and safety may also receive the attention of the occupational hygienist. Biological hazards may stem from the potential for legionella exposure at work or the investigation of biological injury or effects at work, such as dermatitis may be investigated.

As part of the investigation process, the occupational hygienist may be called upon to communicate effectively regarding the nature of the hazard, the potential for risk, and the appropriate methods of control. Appropriate controls are selected from the hierarchy of control: by elimination, substitution, engineering, administration and personal protective equipment (PPE) to control the hazard or eliminate the risk. Such controls may involve recommendations as simple as appropriate PPE such as a 'basic' particulate dust mask to occasionally designing dust extraction ventilation systems, work places or management systems to manage people and programs for the preservation of health and well-being of those who enter a workplace.

Examples of occupational hygiene include:

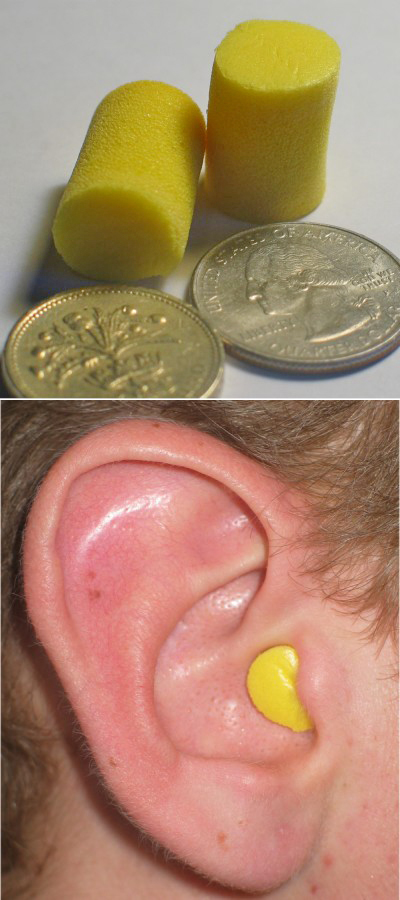
Disposable foam earplugs: out of the ear with coins for scale (top) and inserted into the wearer's ear (bottom).

- Analysis of physical hazards such as noise, which may require use of hearing protection earplugs and/or earmuffs to prevent hearing loss.
- Developing plans and procedures to protect against infectious disease exposure in the event of a flu pandemic.
- Monitoring the air for hazardous contaminants which may potentially lead to worker illness or death.

== Workplace assessment methods ==
Although there are many aspects to occupational hygiene work the most known and sought after is in determining or estimating potential or actual exposures to hazards. For many chemicals and physical hazards, occupational exposure limits have been derived using toxicological, epidemiological and medical data allowing hygienists to reduce the risks of health effects by implementing the "Hierarchy of Hazard Controls". Several methods can be applied in assessing the workplace or environment for exposure to a known or suspected hazard. Occupational hygienists do not rely on the accuracy of the equipment or method used but in knowing with certainty and precision the limits of the equipment or method being used and the error or variance given by using that particular equipment or method. Well known methods for performing occupational exposure assessments can be found in the book A Strategy for Assessing and Managing Occupational Exposures, published by AIHA Press.

The main steps outlined for assessing and managing occupational exposures:

- Basic Characterization (identify agents, hazards, people potentially exposed and existing exposure controls)
- Exposure Assessment (select occupational exposure limits, hazard bands, relevant toxicological data to determine if exposures are "acceptable", "unacceptable" or "uncertain")
- Exposure Controls (for "unacceptable" or "uncertain" exposures)
- Further Information Gathering (for "uncertain" exposures)
- Hazard Communication (for all exposures)
- Reassessment (as needed) / Management of Change

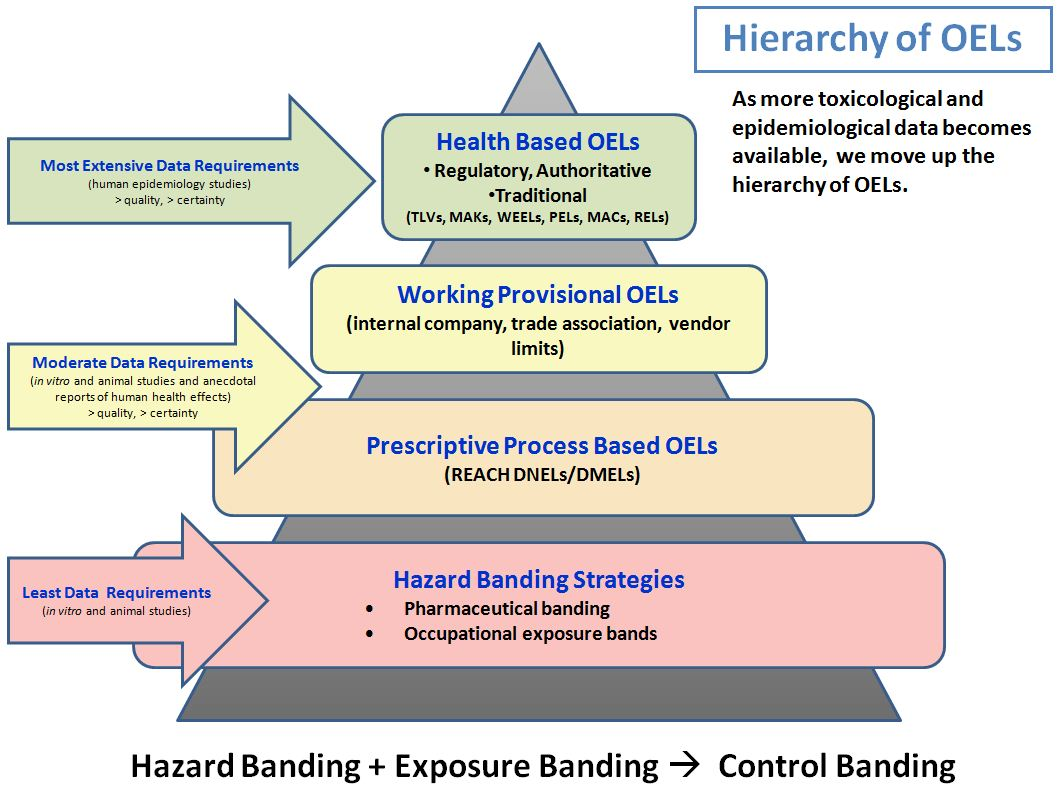
Hierarchy of occupational exposure limits (OELs)

=== Basic characterization, hazard identification and walk-through surveys ===
The first step in understanding health risks related to exposures requires the collection of "basic characterization" information from available sources. A traditional method applied by occupational hygienists to initially survey a workplace or environment is used to determine both the types and possible exposures from hazards (e.g. noise, chemicals, radiation). The walk-through survey can be targeted or limited to particular hazards such as silica dust, or noise, to focus attention on control of all hazards to workers. A full walk-through survey is frequently used to provide information on establishing a framework for future investigations, prioritizing hazards, determining the requirements for measurement and establishing some immediate control of potential exposures. The Health Hazard Evaluation Program from the National Institute for Occupational Safety and Health is an example of an industrial hygiene walk-through survey. Other sources of basic characterization information include worker interviews, observing exposure tasks, material safety data sheets, workforce scheduling, production data, equipment and maintenance schedules to identify potential exposure agents and people possibly exposed.

The information that needs to be gathered from sources should apply to the specific type of work from which the hazards can come from. As mentioned previously, examples of these sources include interviews with people who have worked in the field of the hazard, history and analysis of past incidents, and official reports of work and the hazards encountered. Of these, the personnel interviews may be the most critical in identifying undocumented practices, events, releases, hazards and other relevant information. Once the information is gathered from a collection of sources, it is recommended for these to be digitally archived (to allow for quick searching) and to have a physical set of the same information in order for it to be more accessible. One innovative way to display the complex historical hazard information is with a historical hazards identification map, which distills the hazard information into an easy-to-use graphical format.

=== Sampling ===
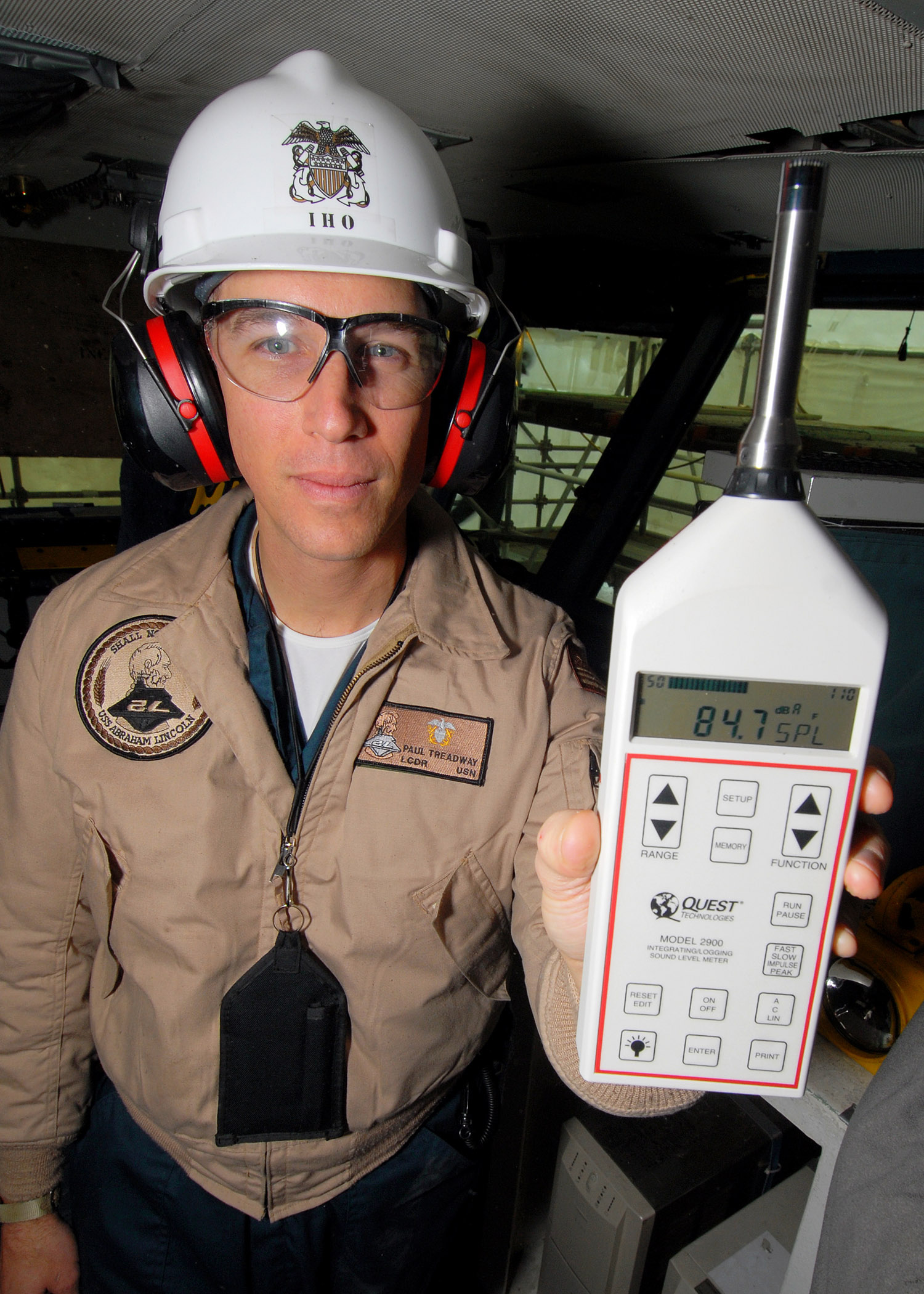
Measurements of noise levels using a sound level meter is a component of the occupational hygiene assessment.

An occupational hygienist may use one or a number of commercially available electronic measuring devices to measure noise, vibration, ionizing and non-ionizing radiation, dust, solvents, gases, and so on. Each device is often specifically designed to measure a specific or particular type of contaminant. Electronic devices need to be calibrated before and after use to ensure the accuracy of the measurements taken and often require a system of certifying the precision of the instrument.

Collecting occupational exposure data is resource- and time-intensive, and can be used for different purposes, including evaluating compliance with government regulations and for planning preventive interventions. The usability of occupational exposure data is influenced by these factors:

- Data storage (e.g. use of electronic and centralized databases with retention of all records)
- Standardization of data collection
- Collaboration between researchers, safety and health professionals and insurers

In 2018, in an effort to standardize industrial hygiene data collection among workers compensation insurers and to determine the feasibility of pooling collected IH data, IH air and noise survey forms were collected. Data fields were evaluated for importance and a study list of core fields was developed, and submitted to an expert panel for review before finalization. The final core study list was compared to recommendations published by the American Conference of Governmental Industrial Hygienists (ACGIH) and the American Industrial Hygiene Association (AIHA). Data fields essential to standardizing IH data collection were identified and verified. The "essential" data fields are available and could contribute to improved data quality and its management if incorporated into IH data management systems.

Canada and several European countries have been working to establish occupational exposure databases with standardized data elements and improved data quality. These databases include MEGA, COLCHIC, and CWED.

==== Dust sampling ====
Nuisance dust is considered to be the total dust in air including inhalable and respirable fractions.

Various dust sampling methods exist that are internationally recognised. Inhalable dust is determined using the modern equivalent of the Institute of Occupational Medicine (IOM) MRE 113A monitor. Inhalable dust is considered to be dust of less than 100 micrometers aerodynamic equivalent diameter (AED) that enters through the nose and or mouth.

Respirable dust is sampled using a cyclone dust sampler design to sample for a specific fraction of dust AED at a set flow rate. The respirable dust fraction is dust that enters the 'deep lung' and is considered to be less than 10 micrometers AED.

Nuisance, inhalable and respirable dust fractions are all sampled using a constant volumetric pump for a specific sampling period. By knowing the mass of the sample collected and the volume of air sampled, a concentration for the fraction sampled can be given in milligrams (mg) per meter cubed (m^{3}). From such samples, the amount of inhalable or respirable dust can be determined and compared to the relevant occupational exposure limits.

By use of inhalable, respirable or other suitable sampler (7 hole, 5 hole, etc.), these dust sampling methods can also used to determine metal exposure in the air. This requires collection of the sample on a methyl cellulose ester (MCE) filter and acid digestion of the collection media in the laboratory followed by measuring metal concentration through atomic absorption spectroscopy or atomic emission spectroscopy. Both the UK Health and Safety Laboratory and NIOSH Manual of Analytical Methods have specific methodologies for a broad range of metals in air found in industrial processing (smelting, foundries, etc.).

A further method exists for the determination of asbestos, fiberglass, synthetic mineral fiber and ceramic mineral fiber dust in air. This is the membrane filter method (MFM) and requires the collection of the dust on a gridded filter for estimation of exposure by the counting of 'conforming' fibers in 100 fields through a microscope. Results are quantified on the basis of number of fibers per milliliter of air (f/mL). Many countries strictly regulate the methodology applied to the MFM.

Dust sampling is also performed when measuring the dust from work surfaces. This is particularly important in workplaces where dust can contain toxic metals, for example lead, given that dust in surfaces can contribute to overall exposure. A study performed sampling at three lead-exposed workplaces and found that although lead on surfaces was higher in production areas compared to non-production areas, lead was still present in areas where workers are not wearing personal protective equipment or eating like lounges

==== Chemical sampling ====
Two types of chemically absorbent tubes are used to sample for a wide range of chemical substances. Traditionally a chemical absorbent 'tube' (a glass or stainless steel tube of between 2 and 10 mm internal diameter) filled with very fine absorbent silica (hydrophilic) or carbon, such as coconut charcoal (lipophilic), is used in a sampling line where air is drawn through the absorbent material for between four hours (minimum workplace sample) to 24 hours (environmental sample) period. The hydrophilic material readily absorbs water-soluble chemical and the lipophilic material absorbs non water-soluble materials. The absorbent material is then chemically or physically extracted and measurements performed using various gas chromatography or mass spectrometry methods. These absorbent tube methods have the advantage of being usable for a wide range of potential contaminates. However, they are relatively expensive methods, are time-consuming and require significant expertise in sampling and chemical analysis. A frequent complaint of workers is in having to wear the sampling pump (up to 1 kg) for several days of work to provide adequate data for the required statistical certainty determination of the exposure.

In the last few decades, advances have been made in 'passive' badge technology. These samplers can now be purchased to measure one chemical (e.g. formaldehyde) or a chemical type (e.g. ketones) or a broad spectrum of chemicals (e.g. solvents). They are relatively easy to set up and use. However, considerable cost can still be incurred in analysis of the 'badge'. They weigh 20 to 30 grams and workers do not complain about their presence. Unfortunately 'badges' may not exist for all types of workplace sampling that may be required, and the charcoal or silica method may sometimes have to be applied.

From the sampling method, results are expressed in milligrams per cubic meter (mg/m^{3}) or parts per million (PPM) and compared to the relevant occupational exposure limits.

It is a critical part of the exposure determination that the method of sampling for the specific contaminate exposure is directly linked to the exposure standard used. Many countries regulate both the exposure standard, the method used to determine the exposure and the methods to be used for chemical or other analysis of the samples collected.

==== Noise sampling ====
Two types of noise are environmental noise, which is unwanted sound that occurs outdoors, and occupational noise, the sound that is received by employees while they are in the workplace. Environmental noise can originate from various sources depending on the activity, location, and time. Environmental noise can be generated from transportation such as road, rail, and air traffic, or construction and building services, and even domestic and leisure activities.

There is a legal limit on noise that the environmental noise is 70 dB(A) over 24 hours of average exposure. Similarly, the limit of occupational noise is 85 dB(A) per NIOSH, or 90 dB(A) per OSHA for an 8-hour work period. In order to enforce these limits, these are the methods to measure noise, including sound level meter (SLM), Sound Level Meter App, integrating sound level meter (ISLM), impulse sound level meter (Impulse SLM), noise dosimeter, and personal sound exposure meter (PSEM).

- Sound level meter (SLM): measures the sound level at a single point of time and consequently requires multiple measurements to be taken at different times of the day. The SLM is primarily used for measuring relatively stable sound levels; there is increased difficulty in measuring the average sound exposure if the noise levels vary greatly.
- Sound Level Meter App is a program that can be downloaded to a mobile device. It receives noise through the phone's built-in or external microphone and displays the sound level measurement from the app's sound level meters and noise dosimeters.
- Integrating sound level meter (ISLM): measures the equivalent sound levels within the measurement period. Because the ISLM measures noise in a particular area, it is difficult to measure a worker's personal exposure as they move throughout a workspace.
- Impulse sound level meter (Impulse SLM): measures the peak of each sound impulse. The most optimal conditions to measure the peaks occur when there is little background noise.
- Noise dosimeter: collects the sound level for a given point in time, as well as different sound levels across time. The noise dosimeter can measure personal exposure levels and can be used in the areas with a high risk of fire.
- Personal sound exposure meter (PSEM): worn by employees while they work. The advantage of the PSEM is that it eliminates the need for noise assessors to follow up with workers when the assessors measure the noise levels of the work areas.

Excessive noise can lead to occupational hearing loss. 12% of workers report having hearing difficulties, making this the third most common chronic disease in the U.S. Among these workers, 24% have hearing difficulties caused by occupational noise, with 8% affected by tinnitus, and 4% having both hearing difficulties and tinnitus.

Ototoxic chemicals including solvents, metals, compounds, asphyxiants, nitriles, and pharmaceuticals, may contribute further to hearing loss.

=== Exposure management and controls ===
The hierarchy of control defines the approach used to reduce exposure risks protecting workers and communities. These methods include elimination, substitution, engineering controls (isolation or ventilation), administrative controls and personal protective equipment. Occupational hygienists, engineers, maintenance, management and employees should all be consulted for selecting and designing the most effective and efficient controls based on the hierarchy of control.

== Professional societies ==
The development of industrial hygiene societies originated in the United States, beginning with the first convening of members for the American Conference of Governmental Industrial Hygienists in 1938, and the formation of the American Industrial Hygiene Association in 1939. In the United Kingdom, the British Occupational Hygiene Society started in 1953. Through the years, professional occupational societies have formed in many different countries, leading to the formation of the International Occupational Hygiene Association in 1987, in order to promote and develop occupational hygiene worldwide through the member organizations. The IOHA has grown to 29 member organizations, representing over 20,000 occupational hygienists worldwide, with representation from countries present in every continent.

== Peer-reviewed literature ==
There are several academic journals specifically focused on publishing studies and research in the occupational health field. The Journal of Occupational and Environmental Hygiene (JOEH) has been published jointly since 2004 by the American Industrial Hygiene Association and the American Conference of Governmental Industrial Hygienists, replacing the former American Industrial Hygiene Association Journal and Applied Occupational & Environmental Hygiene journals. Another seminal occupational hygiene journal would be The Annals of Occupational Hygiene, published by the British Occupational Hygiene Society since 1958. Further, NIOSH maintains a searchable bibliographic database (NIOSHTIC-2) of occupational safety and health publications, documents, grant reports, and other communication products.

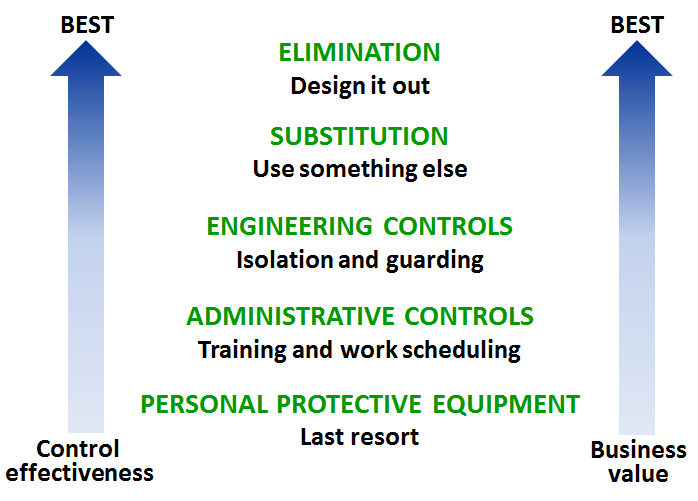
The hierarchy of controls is an important tool to determine how to control hazards most efficiently and effectively in a workplace.

== Occupational hygiene as a career ==
Examples of occupational hygiene careers include:

- Compliance officer on behalf of regulatory agency
- Professional working on behalf of company for the protection of the workforce
- Consultant working on behalf of companies
- Researcher performing laboratory or field occupational hygiene work

=== Education ===
The basis of the technical knowledge of occupational hygiene is from competent training in the following areas of science and management:

- Basic sciences (biology, chemistry, mathematics (statistics), physics)
- Occupational diseases (illness, injury and health surveillance (biostatistics, epidemiology, toxicology))
- Health hazards (biological, chemical and physical hazards, ergonomics and human factors)
- Working environments (mining, industrial, manufacturing, transport and storage, service industries and offices)
- Programme management principles (professional and business ethics, work site and incident investigation methods, exposure guidelines, occupational exposure limits, jurisdictional based regulations, hazard identification, risk assessment and risk communication, data management, fire evacuation and other emergency responses)
- Sampling, measurement and evaluation practices (instrumentation, sampling protocols, methods or techniques, analytical chemistry)
- Hazard controls (elimination, substitution, engineering, administrative, PPE and air conditioning and extraction ventilation)
- Environment (air pollution, hazardous waste)

However, it is not rote knowledge that identifies a competent occupational hygienist. There is an "art" to applying the technical principles in a manner that provides a reasonable solution for workplace and environmental issues. In effect an experienced "mentor", who has experience in occupational hygiene is required to show a new occupational hygienist how to apply the learned scientific and management knowledge in the workplace and to the environment issue to satisfactorily resolve the problem.

To be a professional occupational hygienist, experience in as wide a practice as possible is required to demonstrate knowledge in areas of occupational hygiene. This is difficult for "specialists" or those who practice in narrow subject areas. Limiting experience to individual subject like asbestos remediation, confined spaces, indoor air quality, or lead abatement, or learning only through a textbook or “review course” can be a disadvantage when required to demonstrate competence in other areas of occupational hygiene.

Information presented in Wikipedia can be considered to be only an outline of the requirements for professional occupational hygiene training. This is because the actual requirements in any country, state or region may vary due to educational resources available, industry demand or regulatory mandated requirements.

During 2010, the Occupational Hygiene Training Association (OHTA) through sponsorship provided by the IOHA initiated a training scheme for those with an interest in or those requiring training in occupational hygiene. These training modules can be downloaded and used freely. The available subject modules (Basic Principles in Occupational Hygiene, Health Effects of Hazardous Substances, Measurement of Hazardous Substances, Thermal Environment, Noise, Asbestos, Control, Ergonomics) are aimed at the ‘foundation’ and ‘intermediate’ levels in occupational hygiene. Although the modules can be used freely without supervision, attendance at an accredited training course is encouraged. These training modules are available from ohtatraining.org

Academic programs offering industrial hygiene bachelor's or master's degrees in United States may apply to the Accreditation Board for Engineering and Technology (ABET) to have their program accredited. As of October 1, 2006, 27 institutions have accredited their industrial hygiene programs. Accreditation is not available for doctoral programs.

In the U.S., the training of IH professionals is supported by NIOSH through their NIOSH Education and Research Centers.

=== Professional credentials ===
==== Australia ====
In 2005, the Australian Institute of Occupational Hygiene (AIOH) accredited professional occupational hygienists through a certification scheme. Occupational Hygienists in Australia certified through this scheme are entitled to use the phrase Certified Occupational Hygienist (COH) as part of their qualifications.

==== Hong Kong ====
Registered Professional Hygienist Registration & Examination Board (RPH R&EB) is set up by the Council of the Hong Kong Institute of Occupational & Environmental Hygiene (HKIOEH) with an aim to enhance the professional development of occupational hygienists and to provide a path for persons who reach professional maturity in the field of occupational hygiene to obtain qualification recognised by peer professionals. Under HKIOEH, RPH R&EB operates the registration program of Registered Professional Hygienist (RPH) and qualifying examination in a standard meeting the practice as recognised by the National Accreditation Recognition (NAR) Committee of the International Occupational Hygiene Association (IOHA).

==== Saudi Arabia ====
The Saudi Arabian Ministry of Health's Occupational Health Directorate and Labor Office are the government agencies responsible for decisions and surveillance related to occupational hygiene. Professional occupational hygiene and safety education programs surveilled under these offices are available through Saudi Arabian colleges.

==== United States ====
Practitioners who successfully meet specific education and work-experience requirements and pass a written examination administered by the Board for Global EHS Credentialing (BGC) are authorized to use the term Certified Industrial Hygienist (CIH) or the discontinued Certified Associate Industrial Hygienist (CAIH). Both of these terms have been codified into law in many states in the United States to identify minimum qualifications of individuals having oversight over certain activities that may affect employee and general public health.

After the initial certification, the CIH or CAIH maintains their certification by meeting on-going requirements for ethical behavior, education, and professional activities (e.g., active practice, technical committees, publishing, teaching).

Certification examinations are offered during a spring and fall testing window each year worldwide.

The CIH designation is the most well known and recognized industrial hygiene designation throughout the world. There are approximately 6800 CIHs in the world making BGC the largest industrial hygiene certification organization. The CAIH certification program was discontinued in 2006. Those who were certified as a CAIH retain their certification through ongoing certification maintenance. People who are currently certified by BGC can be found in a public roster.

The BGC is a recognized certification board by the International Occupational Hygiene Association (IOHA). The CIH certification has been accredited internationally by the International Organization for Standardization/International Electrotechnical Commission (ISO/IEC 17024). In the United States, the CIH has been accredited by the Council of Engineering and Scientific Specialty Boards (CESB).

==== Canada ====
In Canada, a practitioner who successfully completes a written test and an interview administered by the Canadian Registration Board of Occupational Hygienists can be recognized as a Registered Occupational Hygienist (ROH) or Registered Occupational Hygiene Technician (ROHT). There is also designation to be recognized as a Canadian Registered Safety Professional (CRSP).

==== United Kingdom ====
The Faculty of Occupational Hygiene, part of the British Occupational Hygiene Society, represents the interests of professional occupational hygienists.

Membership of the Faculty of Occupational Hygiene is confined to BOHS members who hold a recognized professional qualification in occupational hygiene.

There are three grades of Faculty membership:

- Licentiate (LFOH) holders will have obtained the BOHS Certificate of Operational Competence in Occupational Hygiene and have at least three years’ practical experience in the field.
- Members (MFOH) are normally holders of the Diploma of Professional Competence in Occupational Hygiene and have at least five years’ experience at a senior level.
- Fellows (FFOH) are senior members of the profession who have made a distinct contribution to the advancement of occupational hygiene.

All Faculty members participate in a Continuous Professional Development (CPD) scheme designed to maintain a high level of current awareness and knowledge in occupational hygiene.

==== India ====
The Indian Society of Industrial Hygiene was formed in 1981 at Chennai, India. Subsequently, its secretariat was shifted to Kanpur. The society has registered about 400 members, about 90 of whom are life members. The society publishes a newsletter, Industrial Hygiene Link. The secretary of the society is Shyam Singh Gautam.

== See also ==
- Astronautical hygiene – Evaluation and mitigation system
- Human factors and ergonomics
- Exposure assessment – Measuring toxic or environment exposure
- Indoor air quality – Air quality within and around buildings and structures
- Infection control – Medical discipline for preventing nosocomial or healthcare-associated infection
- Institute of Occupational Medicine – Independent charity in UK
- Noise Control – International scientific society
- Occupational exposure limit – Upper limit on the acceptable concentration of a hazardous substance
- Occupational exposure banding – Categorization process for chemical hazards
- Occupational epidemiology – Epidemiology of workplaces diseases
- Occupational safety and health – Field concerned with the safety, health and welfare of people at work
- Occupational health nursing – Nursing specialty
- Toxicity – Dose dependant harmfulness of substances
- Workers' right to access the toilet
