= Prevention through design =

Reduction of occupational hazards by early planning in the design process

Prevention through design (PtD), also called safety by design in Europe, is the concept of applying methods to minimize occupational hazards early in the design process, with an emphasis on optimizing employee health and safety throughout the life cycle of materials and processes. It is a concept and movement that encourages construction or product designers to "design out" health and safety risks during design development. The process also encourages the various stakeholders within a construction project to be collaborative and share the responsibilities of workers' safety evenly. The concept supports the view that along with quality, programme and cost; safety is determined during the design stage. It increases the cost-effectiveness of enhancements to occupational safety and health.

Compared to traditional forms of hazard control, PtD possesses a proactive nature whereas other safety measures are reactive to incidences that occur within construction projects. This method for reducing workplace safety risks lessens workers' reliance on personal protective equipment, which is the least effective of the hierarchy of hazard control.

In the domain of process safety, safety by design is usually referred to as inherent safety or inherently safer design (ISD).

== Background ==
Each year in the U.S., 55,000 people die from work-related injuries and diseases, 294,000 are made sick, and 3.8 million are injured. The annual direct and indirect costs have been estimated to range from $128 billion to $155 billion. For U.S. industries such as construction, even though construction personnel account for only 5% of the total U.S. workforce, they are responsible for nearly 20% of all workplace fatalities. Recent studies in Australia indicate that design is a significant contributor to 37% of work-related fatalities; therefore, the successful implementation of prevention through design concepts can have substantial impacts on worker health and safety.

A safer workplace can be created by removing hazards and reducing worker risks to an appropriate level "at the source," or as early in the life cycle of products or workplaces as possible. Designing, redesigning and retrofitting new and current work environments, systems, tools, facilities, equipment, machinery, goods, chemicals, work processes, and work organization. Improving the working climate by incorporating preventive approaches into all designs that have an effect on employees and those on the premises. The strategic plan lays out the objectives for implementing the PtD Plan for the National Initiative successfully.

The National Institute for Occupational Safety and Health (NIOSH) in the United States is a major contributor and promoter of PtD policy and guidelines. NIOSH considers PtD to be "the most effective and reliable type" of prevention of occupational injuries. A core tenet of PtD philosophy is the concept of addressing workplace hazards using methods at the top of the hierarchy of hazard controls, namely elimination and substitution.

Within Europe, construction designers are legally bound to design out risks during design development to reduce hazards in the construction and end use phases via the Mobile Worksite Directive (also known as CDM regulations in the UK). The concept supports this legal requirement. Some Notified Bodies provide testing and design verification services to ensure compliance with the safety standards defined in regulation codes such as the American Society of Mechanical Engineers. Many non-governmental organizations have been established to support this aim, principally in the UK, Australia and the United States.

== History ==
While engineering, as a rule, factors human safety into the design process, a modern appraisal of specific links to design and workers' safety can be seen in efforts beginning in the 1800s. Trends included the widespread implementation of guards for machinery, controls for elevators, and boiler safety practices. This was followed by enhanced design for ventilation, enclosures, system monitors, lockout/tagout controls, and hearing protectors. More recently, there has been the development of chemical process safety, ergonomically engineered tools, chairs, and workstations, lifting devices, retractable needles, latex-free gloves, and a parade of other safety devices and processes.

In 2007, NIOSH began its National Initiative on Prevention through Design with the goal of promoting prevention through design philosophy, practice, and policy.

== Goal ==
The PtD National Initiative's goal is to avoid or mitigate occupational accidents, diseases, deaths, and exposures by incorporating prevention factors into all designs that impact people in the workplace. This is accomplished by eliminating hazards and reducing worker risks to an acceptable level "at the source," or as early in the life cycle of items or workplaces as possible. Designing, redesigning, and retrofitting new and existing work premises, structures, tools, facilities, equipment, machinery, products, substances, work processes, and work organization.

== Integration ==
Prevention through design represents a shift in approach for on-the-job safety. It involves evaluating potential risks associated with processes, structures, equipment, and tools. It takes into consideration the construction, maintenance, decommissioning, and disposal or recycling of waste material.

The idea of redesigning job tasks and work environments has begun to gain momentum in business and government as a cost-effective means to enhance occupational safety and health. Many U.S. companies openly support PtD concepts and have developed management practices to implement them. Other countries are actively promoting PtD concepts as well. The United Kingdom began requiring construction companies, project owners, and architects to address safety and health during the design phase of projects in 1994. Australia developed the Australian National OHS Strategy 2002–2012, which set "eliminating hazards at the design stage" as one of five national priorities. As a result, the Australian Safety and Compensation Council (ASCC) developed the Safe Design National Strategy and Action Plans for Australia encompassing a wide range of design areas.

== By country ==
=== Australia ===
In Australia, the Work Health and Safety Act of 2011 was passed which included elements that laid out the legal responsibilities of employers, designers, and other stakeholders within construction projects to take the necessary steps to ensure that safety is prioritized through all phases of the construction process. In practice, what this has looked like is Australian state governments such as Queensland, South Australia, and Western Australia mandating design professionals to create a strategy for safety considerations throughout the construction process. The plan has to include pre-construction considerations, how safety can be evaluated, and providing details of how safety will be controlled once the physical construction process begins. Even before the Work Health and Safety Act of 2011, since 1998, any construction project that was valued over AU$3 million was subject to this requirement.

=== United Kingdom ===
Within the United Kingdom (U.K.), PtD has been legally required for those in the construction industry since March 31, 1995. At the time of implementation, the fatality rate within the U.K. construction industry was 10 fatalities per 100,000 workers. In 2021, the fatality rate has been reduced to 1.62 fatalities per 100,000 workers. Although it cannot be established that PtD is the sole facilitator of this reduction in construction fatalities, it does show that since its enactment, fatalities have dropped substantially. Since its establishment in 1995, the UK government has periodically updated the legislation with the 2015 version of The Construction (Design and Management) Regulations placing even greater emphasis on the role that principal designers should play in injury and fatality prevention during the design phase of a project.

=== United States ===
==== Government ====
The National Institute for Occupational Safety and Health (NIOSH) is a contributor to prevention through design efforts in the United States. Several NIOSH initiatives and guidelines directly or indirectly advocate for PtD practices. Through NIOSH efforts, the U.S. Green Building Council posted new PtD credits available for Leadership in Energy and Environmental Design (LEED) certification for construction. Additionally, they provide a wide variety of educational and guidance materials on the topic of PtD. The NIOSH "Buy Quiet" initiative uses elements of prevention through design to encourage companies to buy quieter machinery, thereby reducing occupational hearing loss for their workers.

The Prevention through Design (PtD) Initiative of NIOSH collaborates with business, labor, trade unions, professional organizations, and academia. The curriculum focuses on “designing out” workplace hazards and threats in order to avoid sickness, injury, and death. It encourages technical accreditation bodies to include PtD in their evaluations to educate and encourage others to use PtD goals and processes in collaborative design and renovation of facilities, work processes, equipment, and resources.

Priorities of this initiative include:

- attempting to make business executives aware of the cost-cutting potential of PtD,
- produce succinct, actionable PtD guides and checklists for small companies, their insurers, and the publishers of local government codebooks
- increase PtD practice by disseminating case studies of real-world PtD solutions and empowering stakeholders to implement and share them
- encourage businesses, trade unions, governments, academic institutions, and consensus standards organizations to use PtD in policy revisions.

=== Singapore ===
In Singapore, the government's Workplace Safety and Health Council pioneered a Design for Safety (Dfs) mark which would allow the Singaporean government to recognize construction projects that were completed with safety in mind. Receiving the Dfs mark for safety considerations is analogous to a building receiving a LEED certification for featuring aspects of sustainability and carbon footprint reduction.

== Barriers to PtD implementation ==
=== Education ===
Even though PtD is not a new concept and has shown to be associated with reductions in injuries and fatalities across various construction industries on the international stage, it is still not a core feature of various engineering and architectural schools' curriculum. This can compromise designers' ability to consider safety in real-world applications since they have had limited education on the concept of safety let alone PtD.

== See also ==
- Inherent safety
- Occupational health psychology – Health and Safety psychology
- Occupational exposure banding – Categorization process for chemical hazards
