= British Occupational Hygiene Society =

UK charity providing expertise on workplace health risks

The British Occupational Hygiene Society (BOHS) is a Chartered, science-based, charitable body that provides information and expertise about workplace health risks or occupational hygiene. As of 2023, its president is Alex Wilson and its chief executive officer is Kevin Bampton.

BOHS was founded in 1953. it is a learned society, publishing the peer-reviewed journal, Annals of Work Exposures and Health, and the only professional society representing qualified occupational hygienists in the UK. The Society provides resources, guidance, events and training for its members.

BOHS is the only occupational hygiene organisation to be awarded a Royal Charter: this was granted in 2013 in recognition of BOHS’ role as the leading authority in occupational disease prevention.

In 2017, BOHS launched a new professional body for people who work in asbestos assessment and management. The Faculty of Asbestos Assessment and Management (FAAM) is targeted at individuals working as consultants, asbestos managers, surveyors, analysts and project managers.

== Occupational hygiene ==
Occupational hygiene focuses:

- on the recognition of hazards, assessment of exposure, and control of risks to health
- at the interface of people with the workplace and work activities
- where science and engineering meet the human element of work

== Structure ==
BOHS is a not-for-profit, non-governmental organisation that is managed by a board of directors, known as the Board.

The Faculty of Occupational Hygiene is run by the Faculty Committee and reports to the Board through its Registrar.

The Society's Head Office, based in Derby, is led by a Chief Executive, with a senior management team responsible for finance and operations, membership services, conferences and events, publications, examinations management, marketing and communications, and overall administrative services.

It also has a range of committees, chaired by members and with input from other volunteers and staff; these committees, alongside a team of regional organisers (also volunteers from the membership) provide technical, strategic and project-by-project input to the Society's various initiatives and on-going activities.

== Faculty of Occupational Hygiene ==
The Faculty of Occupational Hygiene is the professional arm of BOHS. Membership is restricted to BOHS members with specific qualifications in occupational hygiene and related subjects.

As the examining board for the profession, the Faculty administers a suite of examinations and awards qualifications in occupational hygiene and allied subjects, and provides a qualifications’ verification service.

The Faculty also runs the Continuing Professional Development (CPD) Scheme, which is mandatory for all non-retired Faculty members.

It maintains a Directory of Occupational Hygiene Services, which is searchable online.

The organisation puts on a conference each year.

== Publications ==
BOHS publishes the Annals of Work Exposures and Health, a peer-reviewed scientific journal (via Oxford University Press).

Additionally, the Society produces Exposure magazine, FAAM News, e-bulletins, guidance and position statements.

== Arms ==
Coat of arms of British Occupational Hygiene Society

Notes
Granted 20 October 2023 at the College of Arms.
Crest
A goat couchant Or armed and unguled Azure resting the dexter forefoot on a lantern Sable illuminated Or and perched up the horns a canary also Or.
Escutcheon
Ermine three plates fimbriated and each charged with a bowl of Hygieia Azure the stems each entwined by a serpent Or.
Supporters
Two goats Or armed and unguled Azure each vested with a cuirass Proper.
