= Engineering controls for nanomaterials =

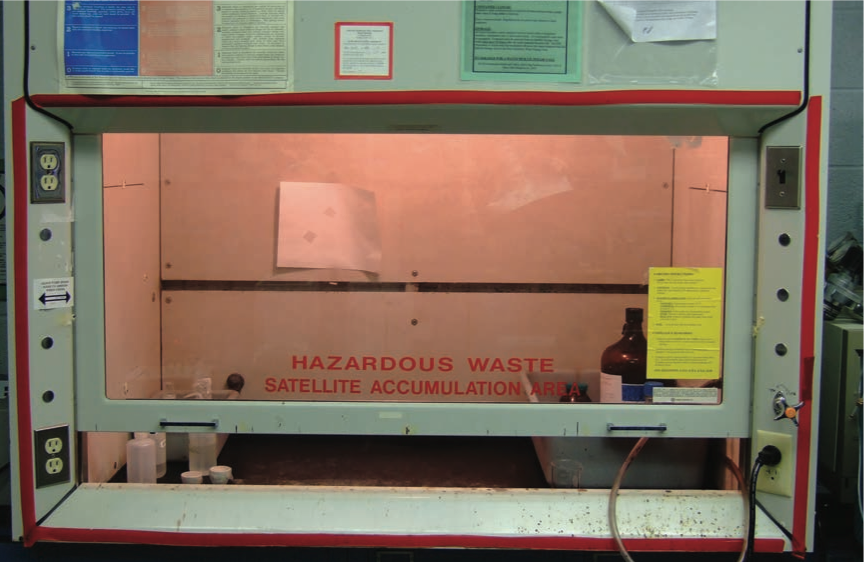
A fume hood is an example of an engineering control that uses local exhaust ventilation combined with an enclosure to isolate a worker from nanomaterials that may become airborne.

Engineering controls for nanomaterials are a set of hazard control methods and equipment for workers who interact with nanomaterials. Engineering controls are physical changes to the workplace that isolate workers from hazards, and are considered the most important set of methods for controlling the health and safety hazards of nanomaterials after systems and facilities have been designed.

The primary hazard of nanomaterials is health effects from inhalation of aerosols containing nanoparticles. Many engineering controls developed for other industries can be used or adapted for protecting workers from exposure to nanomaterials, including ventilation and filtering using laboratory fixtures such as fume hoods, containment using gloveboxes, and other non-ventilation controls such as sticky mats. Research is ongoing as to what engineering controls are most effective for nanomaterials.

== Background ==
=== Engineering controls ===
Engineering controls are the third most effective member of the hierarchy of hazard controls. They are preferred over administrative controls and personal protective equipment, but are less preferred than elimination or substitution of the hazards.

Controlling exposures to occupational hazards is considered the fundamental method of protecting workers. Traditionally, a hierarchy of controls has been used as a means of determining how to implement feasible and effective controls, which typically include elimination, substitution, engineering controls, administrative controls, and personal protective equipment. Methods earlier in the list are considered generally more effective in reducing the risk associated with a hazard, with process changes and engineering controls recommended as the primary means for reducing exposures, and personal protective equipment being the approach of last resort. Following the hierarchy is intended to lead to the implementation of inherently safer systems, ones where the risk of illness or injury has been substantially reduced.

Engineering controls are physical changes to the workplace that isolate workers from hazards by containing them in an enclosure, or removing contaminated air from the workplace through ventilation and filtering. Well-designed engineering controls are typically passive, in the sense of being independent of worker interactions, which reduces the potential for worker behavior to impact exposure levels. They also ideally do not interfere with productivity and ease of processing for the worker, because otherwise the operator may be motivated to circumvent the controls. The initial cost of engineering controls can be higher than administrative controls or personal protective equipment, but the long-term operating costs are frequently lower, and can sometimes provide cost savings in other areas of the process.

=== Nanomaterials ===
Nanomaterials have at least one primary dimension of less than 100 nanometers, and often have properties different from those of their bulk components that are technologically useful. Because nanotechnology is a recent development, the health and safety effects of exposures to nanomaterials, and what levels of exposure may be acceptable, is not yet fully understood. Processing and manufacturing of nanomaterials involve a wide range of hazards. The types of engineering controls optimal for each situation is influenced by the quantity and dustiness of the material as well as the duration of the task. For example, stronger engineering controls are indicated if dry nanomaterials cannot be substituted with a suspension, or if procedures such as sonication or cutting of a solid matrix containing nanomaterials cannot be eliminated.

As with any new technology, the earliest exposures are expected to occur among workers conducting research in laboratories and pilot plants. It is recommended that researchers handling engineered nanomaterials in these contexts perform that work in a manner that is protective of their safety and health. Control measures for nanoparticles, dusts, and other hazards are most effective when implemented within the context of a comprehensive occupational safety and health management system, the critical elements of which include management commitment and employee involvement, worksite analysis, hazard prevention and control, and sufficient training for employees, supervisors, and managers.

== Ventilation ==
Ventilation systems are distinguished as being either local or general. Local exhaust ventilation operates at or near the source of contamination, often in conjunction with an enclosure, while general exhaust ventilation operates on an entire room through a building's HVAC system.

=== Local exhaust ventilation ===
Local exhaust ventilation (LEV) is the application of an exhaust system at or near the source of contamination. If properly designed, it will be much more efficient at removing contaminants than dilution ventilation, requiring lower exhaust volumes, less make-up air, and, in many cases, lower costs. By applying exhaust at the source, contaminants are removed before they get into the general work environment.

Examples of local exhaust systems include fume hoods, vented balance enclosures, and biosafety cabinets. Exhaust hoods lacking an enclosure are less preferable, and laminar flow hoods are not recommended because they direct air outwards towards the worker.

In 2006, a survey was conducted of international nanotechnology firms and research laboratories that reported manufacturing, handling, researching, or using nanomaterials. All organizations participating in the survey reported using some type of engineering control. The most common exposure control used was the traditional laboratory fume hood, with two-thirds of firms reporting its use.

==== Fume hoods ====
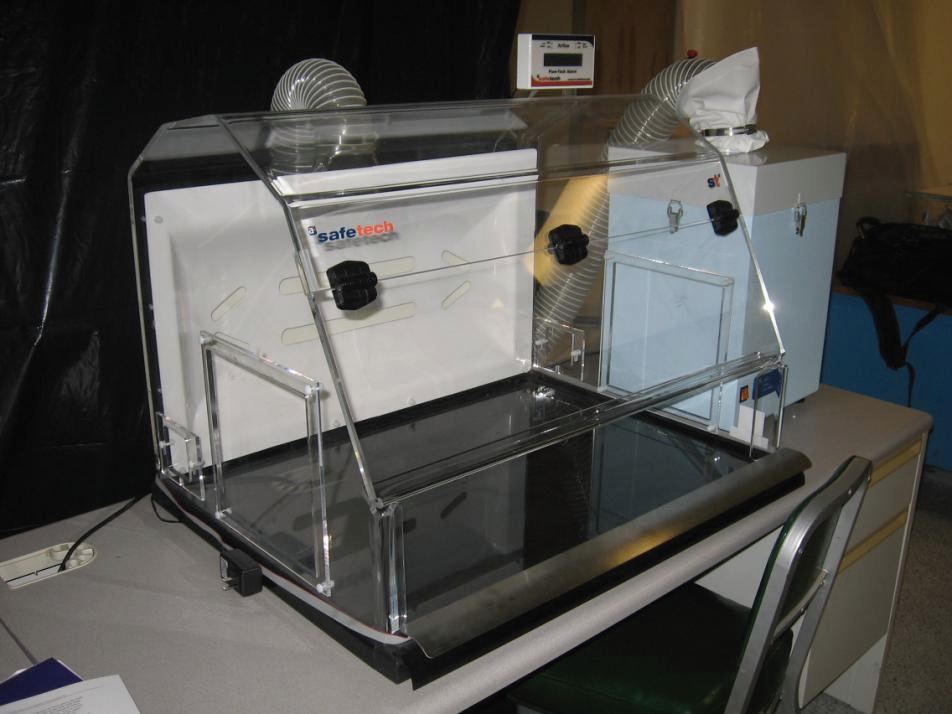
Vented balance enclosures used in the pharmaceutical industry can be used for nanomaterials, with the advantages of smaller size and lower turbulence.

Fume hoods are recommended to have an average inward velocity of 80–100 feet per minute (fpm) at the face of the hood. For higher toxicity materials, a higher face velocity of 100–120 fpm is recommended in order to provide better protection. However, face velocities exceeding 150 fpm are not believed to improve performance, and could increase hood leakage.

New fume hoods specifically designed for nanotechnology are being developed primarily based on low-turbulence balance enclosures, which were initially developed for the weighing of pharmaceutical powders; these nanomaterial handling enclosures provide adequate containment at lower face velocities, typically operating at 65–85 fpm. They are useful for weighing operations, which disturb the nanomaterial and increase its aerosolization.

It is recommended that air exiting a fume hood should be passed through a HEPA filter and exhausted outside the work environment, with used filters being handled as hazardous waste. Turbulence can cause nanomaterials to exit the front of the hood, and can be avoided by keeping the sash in the proper position, keeping the interior of the hood uncluttered with equipment, and not making fast movements while working. High face velocities can result in loss of powdered nanomaterials; while as of 2012 there was little research on the effectiveness for low-flow fume hoods, there was evidence that air curtain hoods were effective at containing nanoparticles.

==== Other enclosures ====
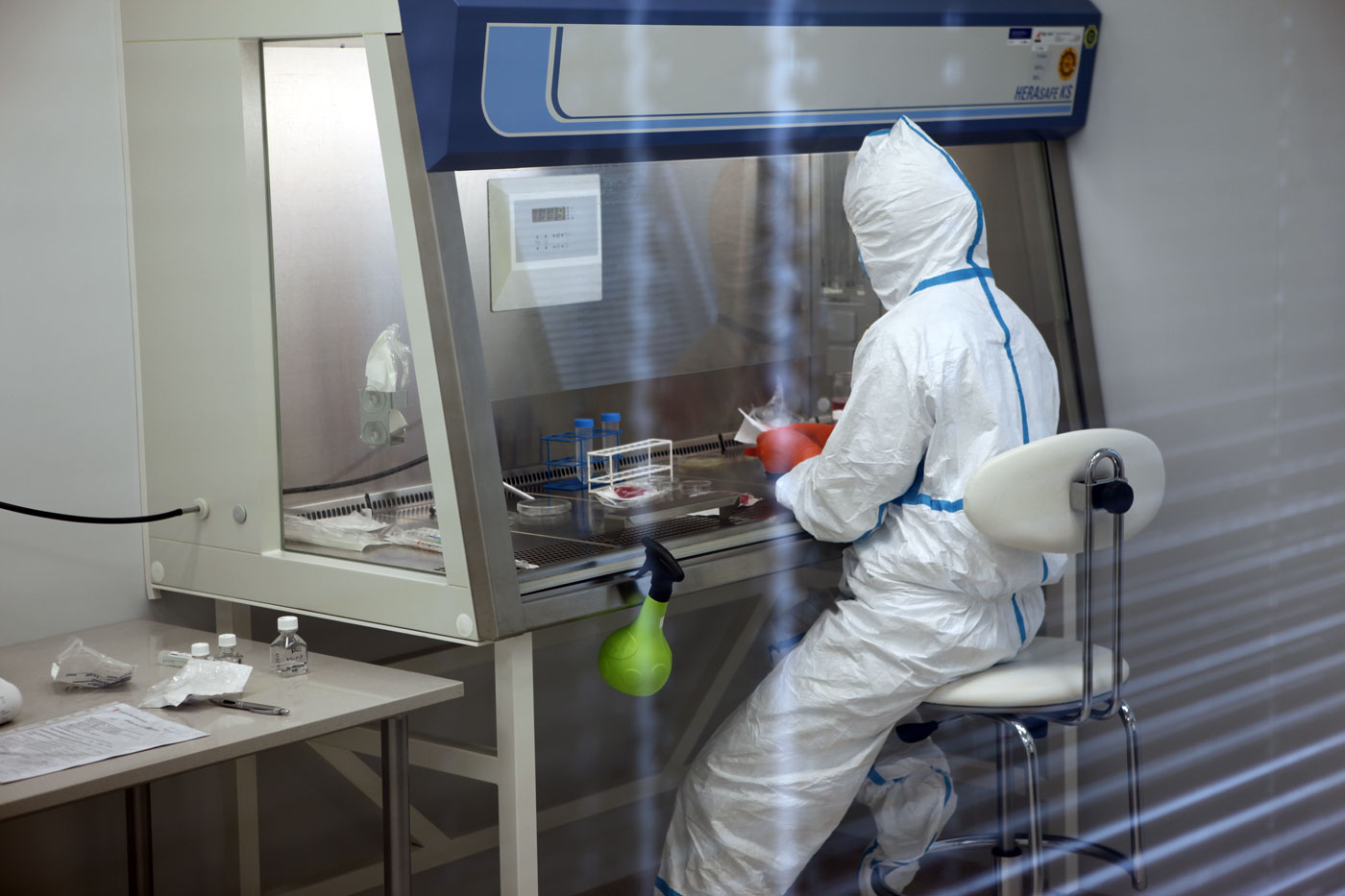
Biosafety cabinets, although designed to contain bioaerosols, can also be used to contain nanomaterials.

Biosafety cabinets are designed to contain bioaerosols, which have a similar size to engineered nanoparticles, and are believed to be effective with nanoparticles. However, common biosafety cabinets are more prone to turbulence. As with fume hoods, they are recommended to be exhausted outside the facility.

Dedicated large-scale ventilated enclosures for large pieces of equipment can also be used.

=== General exhaust ventilation ===
General exhaust ventilation (GEV), also called dilution ventilation, is different from local exhaust ventilation because instead of capturing emissions at their source and removing them from the air, general exhaust ventilation allows the contaminant to be emitted into the workplace air and then dilutes the concentration of the contaminant to an acceptable level. GEV is inefficient and costly as compared to local exhaust ventilation, and given the lack of established exposure limits for most nanomaterials, they are not recommended to be relied upon for controlling exposure.

However, GEV can provide negative room pressure to prevent contaminants from exiting the room. The use of supply and exhaust air throughout the facility can provide pressurization schemes that reduce the number of workers exposed to potentially hazardous materials, for example keeping production areas at a negative pressure with respect to nearby areas. For general exhaust ventilation in laboratories, a nonrecirculating system is used with 4–12 air changes per hour when used in tandem with local exhaust ventilation, and sources of contamination are placed close to the air exhaust and downwind of workers, and away from windows or doors that may cause air drafts.

=== Control verification ===
Several control verification techniques can be used to assess room airflow patterns and verify the proper operation of LEV systems. It is considered important to confirm that an LEV system is operating as designed by regularly measuring exhaust airflows. A standard measurement, hood static pressure, provides information on airflow changes that affect hood performance. For hoods designed to prevent exposures to hazardous airborne contaminants, the American Conference of Governmental Industrial Hygienists recommends the installation of a fixed hood static pressure gauge.

Additionally, Pitot tubes, hot-wire anemometers, smoke generators, and dry ice tests can be used to qualitatively measure hood slot/face and duct air velocity, while tracer-gas leak testing is a quantitative method. Standardized testing and certification procedures such as ANSI Z9.5 and ASHRAE 110 can be used, as can qualitative indicators of proper installation and functionality such as inspection of gaskets and hoses.

== Containment ==
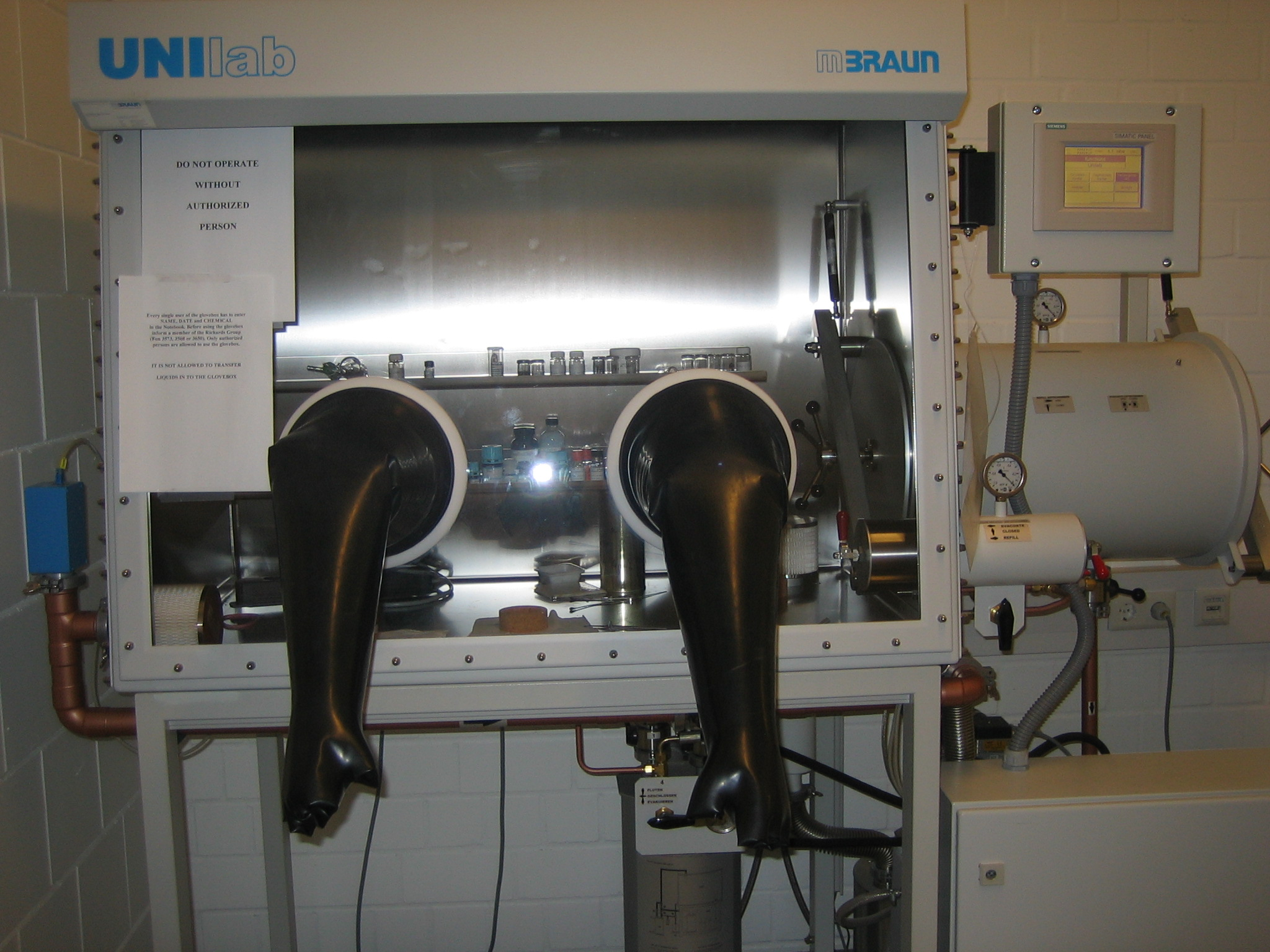
Gloveboxes are completely enclosed, but are more difficult to use than fume hoods, and may leak if used under positive pressure.

Containment refers to the physical isolation of a process or a piece of equipment to prevent the release of the hazardous material into the workplace. It can be used in conjunction with ventilation measures to provide an enhanced level of protection for nanomaterial workers. Examples include placing equipment that may release nanomaterials in a separate room. Standard dust control methods such as enclosures for conveyor systems or using a sealed system for bag filling are effective at reducing respirable dust concentrations.

Non-ventilation engineering controls can also include devices developed for the pharmaceutical industry, including isolation containment systems. One of the most common flexible isolation systems is glovebox containment, which can be used as an enclosure around small-scale powder processes, such as mixing and drying. Rigid glovebox isolation units also provide a method for isolating the worker from the process and are often used for medium-scale operations involving transfer of powders. Glovebags are similar to rigid gloveboxes, but they are flexible and disposable. They are used for small operations for containment or protection from contamination. Gloveboxes are sealed systems that provide a high degree of operator protection, but are more difficult to use due to limited mobility and size of operation. Transferring materials into and out of the enclosure also is an exposure risk. In addition, some gloveboxes are configured to use positive pressure, which can increase the risk of leaks.

Another non-ventilation control used in this industry is the continuous liner system, which allows the filling of product containers while enclosing the material in a polypropylene bag. This system is often used for off-loading materials when the powders are to be packed into drums.

== Other engineering controls ==
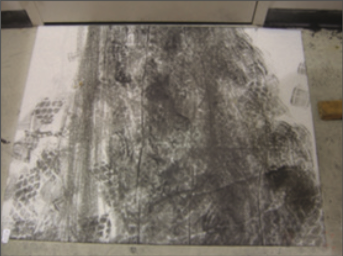
A sticky mat in a nanomaterials production facility. Ideally, other engineering controls should lessen the amount of dust collecting on the floor and being tracked onto the sticky mat, unlike this example.

Other non-ventilation engineering controls in general cover a range of control measures, such as guards and barricades, material treatment, or additives. One example is placing walk-off sticky mats at room exits. Antistatic devices can be used when handling nanomaterials to reduce their electrostatic charge, making them less likely to disperse or adhere to clothing. Water spray application is also an effective method for reducing respirable dust concentrations.
