= Engineering control =

Hazard controls that are physical changes to the workplace

Engineering controls are strategies designed to protect workers from hazardous conditions by placing a barrier between the worker and the hazard or by removing a hazardous substance through air ventilation. Engineering controls involve a physical change to the workplace itself, rather than relying on workers' behavior or requiring workers to wear protective clothing.

Engineering controls is the third of five members of the hierarchy of hazard controls, which orders control strategies by their feasibility and effectiveness. Engineering controls are preferred over administrative controls and personal protective equipment (PPE) because they are designed to remove the hazard at the source, before it comes in contact with the worker. Well-designed engineering controls can be highly effective in protecting workers and will typically be independent of worker interactions to provide this high level of protection. The initial cost of engineering controls can be higher than the cost of administrative controls or PPE, but over the longer term, operating costs are frequently lower, and in some instances, can provide a cost savings in other areas of the process.

Elimination and substitution are usually considered to be separate levels of hazard controls, but in some schemes they are categorized as types of engineering control.

The U.S. National Institute for Occupational Safety and Health researches engineering control technologies, and provides information on their details and effectiveness in the NIOSH Engineering Controls Database.

== Background ==
Engineering controls are the third most effective member of the hierarchy of hazard controls. They are preferred over administrative controls and personal protective equipment, but are less preferred than elimination or substitution of the hazards.

Controlling exposures to occupational hazards is considered the fundamental method of protecting workers. Traditionally, a hierarchy of controls has been used as a means of determining how to implement feasible and effective controls, which typically include elimination, substitution, engineering controls, administrative controls, and personal protective equipment. Methods earlier in the list are considered generally more effective in reducing the risk associated with a hazard, with process changes and engineering controls recommended as the primary means for reducing exposures, and personal protective equipment being the approach of last resort. Following the hierarchy is intended to lead to the implementation of inherently safer systems, ones where the risk of illness or injury has been substantially reduced.

Engineering controls are physical changes to the workplace that isolate workers from hazards by containing them in an enclosure, or removing contaminated air from the workplace through ventilation and filtering. Well-designed engineering controls are typically passive, in the sense of being independent of worker interactions, which reduces the potential for worker behavior to impact exposure levels. They also ideally do not interfere with productivity and ease of processing for the worker, because otherwise the operator may be motivated to circumvent the controls. The initial cost of engineering controls can be higher than administrative controls or personal protective equipment, but the long-term operating costs are frequently lower, and can sometimes provide cost savings in other areas of the process.

== Chemical and biological hazards ==
Various chemical hazards and biological hazards are known to cause disease. Engineering control approaches are often oriented towards reducing inhalation exposure through ventilation and isolation of the toxic material. However, isolation can also be useful for preventing skin and eye contact as well, reducing reliance on personal protective equipment which should be the control of last resort.

=== Ventilation ===
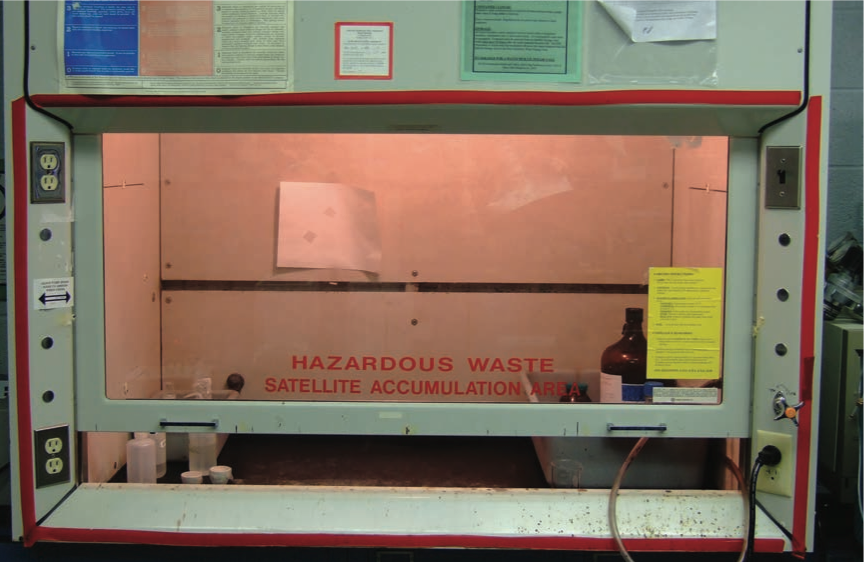
A fume hood is an example of an engineering control that uses local exhaust ventilation combined with an enclosure to isolate a worker from airborne gasses or particulates.

Ventilation systems are distinguished as being either local or general. Local exhaust ventilation operates at or near the source of contamination, often in conjunction with an enclosure, while general exhaust ventilation operates on an entire room through a building's HVAC system.

==== Local exhaust ventilation ====
Local exhaust ventilation (LEV) is the application of an exhaust system at or near the source of contamination. If properly designed, it will be much more efficient at removing contaminants than dilution ventilation, requiring lower exhaust volumes, less make-up air, and, in many cases, lower costs. By applying exhaust at the source, contaminants are removed before they get into the general work environment. Examples of local exhaust systems include fume hoods, vented balance enclosures, and biosafety cabinets. Exhaust hoods lacking an enclosure are less preferable, and laminar flow hoods are not recommended because they direct air outwards towards the worker.

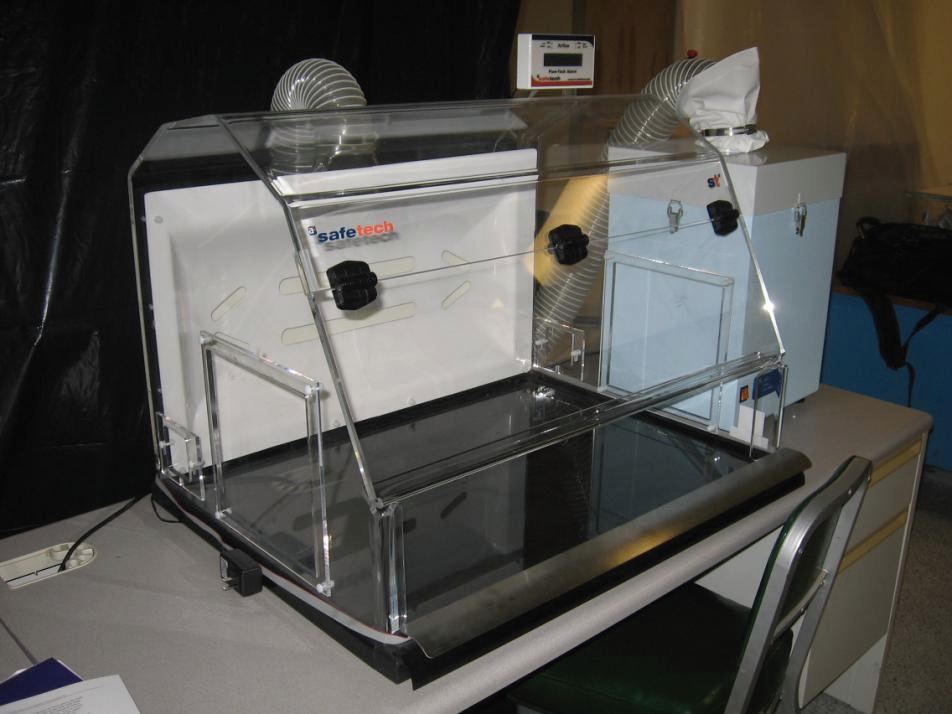
Vented balance enclosures used in the pharmaceutical industry can be used for nanomaterials, with the advantages of smaller size and lower turbulence.

Fume hoods are recommended to have an average inward velocity of 80–100 feet per minute (fpm) at the face of the hood. For higher toxicity materials, a higher face velocity of 100–120 fpm is recommended in order to provide better protection. However, face velocities exceeding 150 fpm are not believed to improve performance, and could increase hood leakage. It is recommended that air exiting a fume hood should be passed through a HEPA filter and exhausted outside the work environment, with used filters being handled as hazardous waste. Turbulence can cause materials to exit the front of the hood, and can be avoided by keeping the sash in the proper position, keeping the interior of the hood uncluttered with equipment, and not making fast movements while working.

Low-turbulence balance enclosures were initially developed for the weighing of pharmaceutical powders and are also used for nanomaterials; these provide adequate containment at lower face velocities, typically operating at 65–85 fpm. They are useful for weighing operations, which disturb the material and increase its aerosolization.

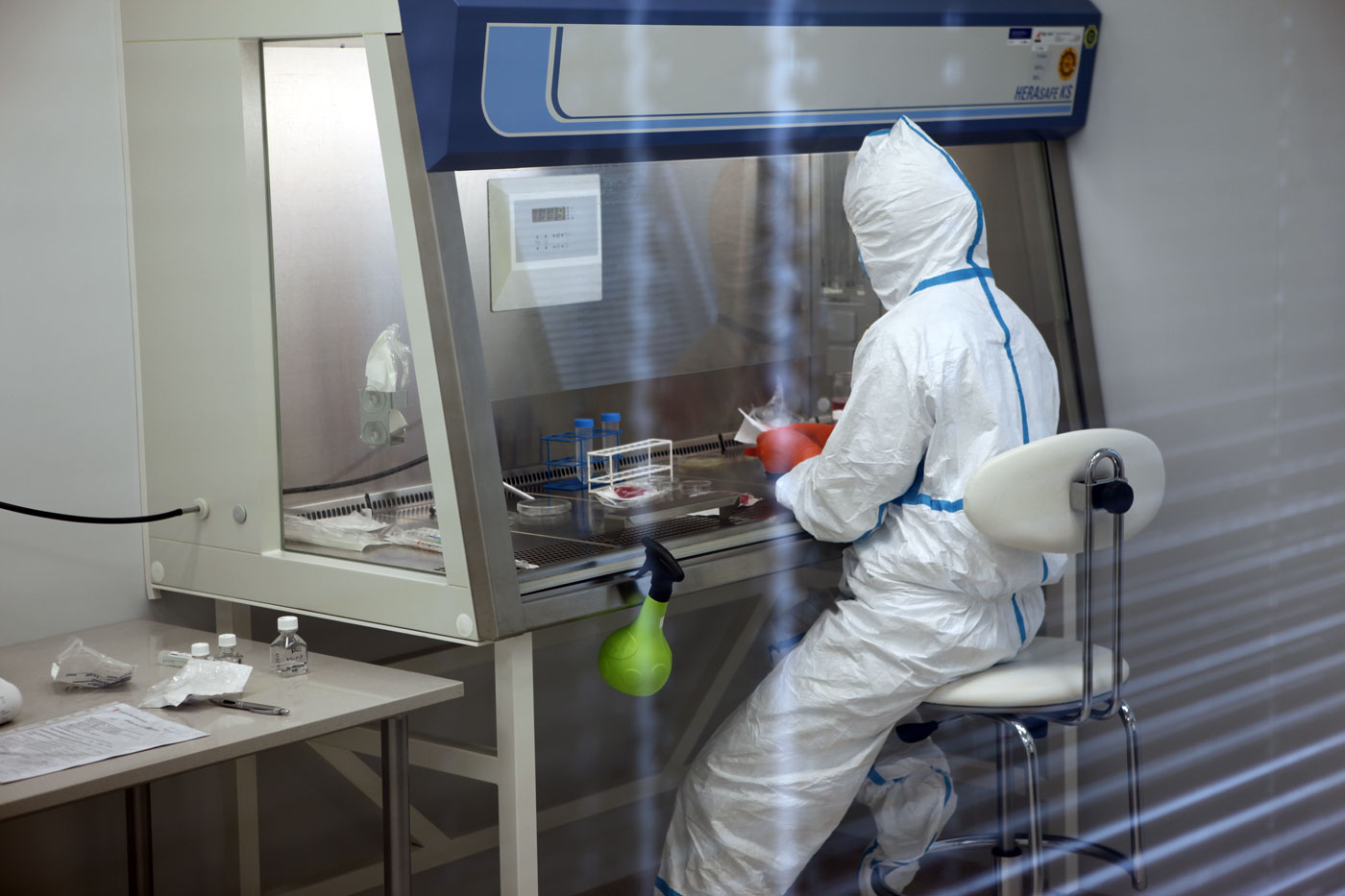
Biosafety cabinets, although designed to contain bioaerosols, can also be used to contain nanomaterials.

Biosafety cabinets are designed to contain bioaerosols. However, common biosafety cabinets are more prone to turbulence. As with fume hoods, they are recommended to be exhausted outside the facility.

Dedicated large-scale ventilated enclosures for large pieces of equipment can also be used.

==== General exhaust ventilation ====
General exhaust ventilation (GEV), also called dilution ventilation, is different from local exhaust ventilation because instead of capturing emissions at their source and removing them from the air, general exhaust ventilation allows the contaminant to be emitted into the workplace air and then dilutes the concentration of the contaminant to an acceptable level. GEV is inefficient and costly as compared to local exhaust ventilation, and given the lack of established exposure limits for most nanomaterials, they are not recommended to be relied upon for controlling exposure.

However, GEV can provide negative room pressure to prevent contaminants from exiting the room. The use of supply and exhaust air throughout the facility can provide pressurization schemes that reduce the number of workers exposed to potentially hazardous materials, for example keeping production areas at a negative pressure with respect to nearby areas. For general exhaust ventilation in laboratories, a nonrecirculating system is used with 4–12 air changes per hour when used in tandem with local exhaust ventilation, and sources of contamination are placed close to the air exhaust and downwind of workers, and away from windows or doors that may cause air drafts.

==== Control verification ====
Several control verification techniques can be used to assess room airflow patterns and verify the proper operation of LEV systems. It is considered important to confirm that an LEV system is operating as designed by regularly measuring exhaust airflows. A standard measurement, hood static pressure, provides information on airflow changes that affect hood performance. For hoods designed to prevent exposure to hazardous airborne contaminants, the American Conference of Governmental Industrial Hygienists recommends the installation of a fixed hood static pressure gauge.

Additionally, Pitot tubes, hot-wire anemometers, smoke generators, and dry ice tests can be used to qualitatively measure hood slot/face and duct air velocity, while tracer-gas leak testing is a quantitative method. Standardized testing and certification procedures such as ANSI Z9.5 and ASHRAE 110 can be used, as can qualitative indicators of proper installation and functionality such as inspection of gaskets and hoses.

=== Containment ===
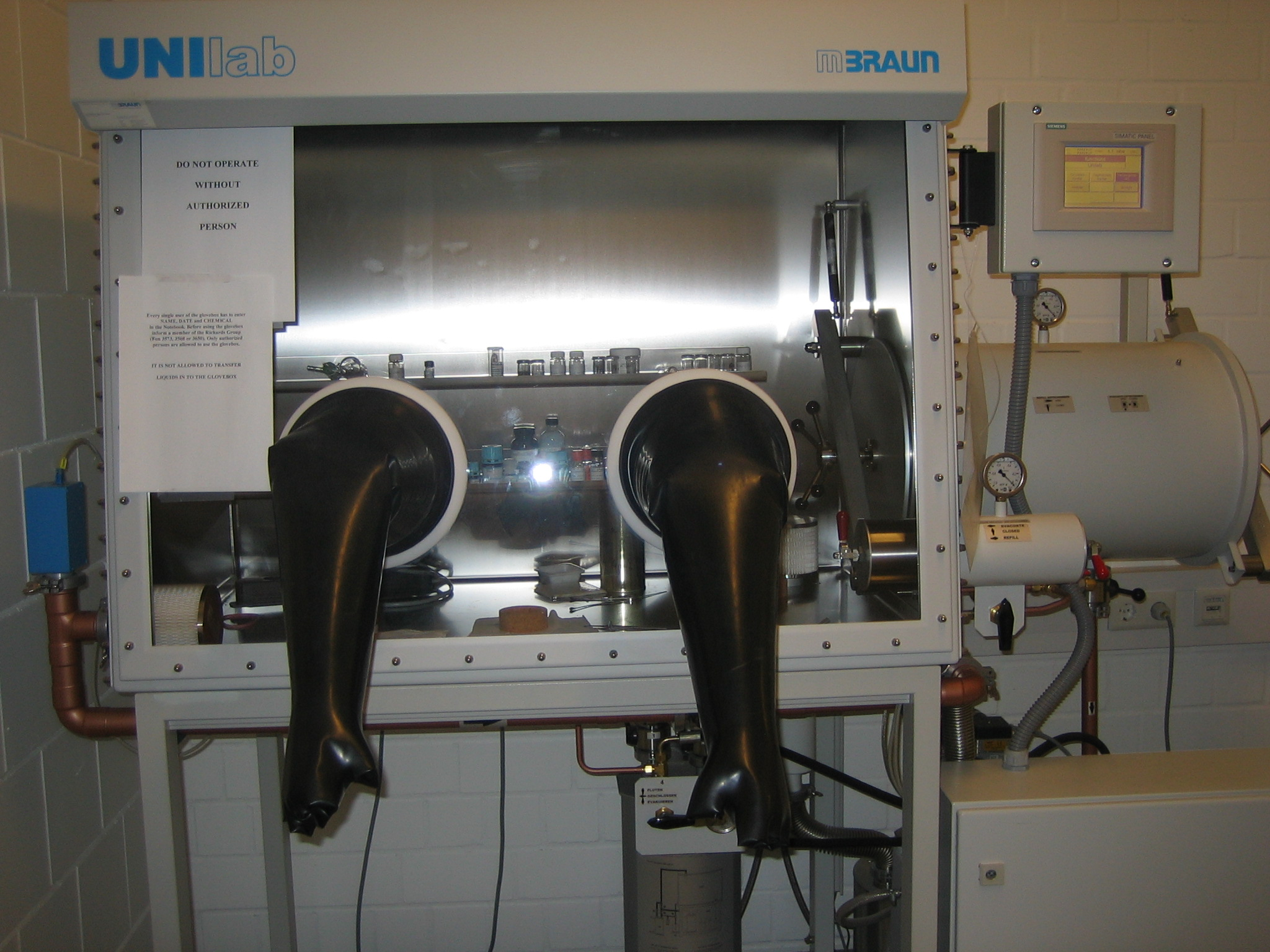
Gloveboxes are completely enclosed, but are more difficult to use than fume hoods, and may leak if used under positive pressure.

Containment refers to the physical isolation of a process or a piece of equipment to prevent the release of the hazardous material into the workplace. It can be used in conjunction with ventilation measures to provide an enhanced level of protection for nanomaterial workers. Examples include placing equipment that may release toxic materials in a separate room. Standard dust control methods such as enclosures for conveyor systems or using a sealed system for bag filling are effective at reducing respirable dust concentrations.

Non-ventilation engineering controls can also include devices developed for the pharmaceutical industry, including isolation containment systems. One of the most common flexible isolation systems is glovebox containment, which can be used as an enclosure around small-scale powder processes, such as mixing and drying. Rigid glovebox isolation units also provide a method for isolating the worker from the process and are often used for medium-scale operations involving transfer of powders. Glovebags are similar to rigid gloveboxes, but they are flexible and disposable. They are used for small operations for containment or protection from contamination. Gloveboxes are sealed systems that provide a high degree of operator protection, but are more difficult to use due to limited mobility and size of operation. Transferring materials into and out of the enclosure also is an exposure risk. In addition, some gloveboxes are configured to use positive pressure, which can increase the risk of leaks.

Another non-ventilation control used in this industry is the continuous liner system, which allows the filling of product containers while enclosing the material in a polypropylene bag. This system is often used for off-loading materials when the powders are to be packed into drums.

=== Other ===
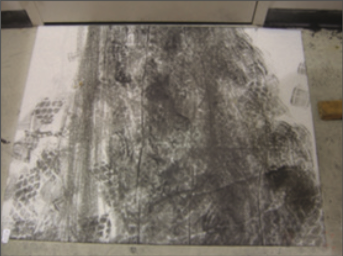
A sticky mat in a nanomaterials production facility. Ideally, other engineering controls should lessen the amount of dust collecting on the floor and being tracked onto the sticky mat, unlike this example.

Other non-ventilation engineering controls in general cover a range of control measures, such as guards and barricades, material treatment, or additives. One example is placing walk-off sticky mats at room exits. Antistatic devices can be used when handling particulates including nanomaterials to reduce their electrostatic charge, making them less likely to disperse or adhere to clothing. Water spray application is also an effective method for reducing respirable dust concentrations.

== Physical hazards ==
=== Ergonomic hazards ===
Ergonomics is the study of how employees relate to their work environments. Ergonomists and industrial hygienists aim to prevent musculoskeletal disorders and soft tissue injuries by fitting the workers to their work space. Tools, lighting, tasks, controls, displays, and equipment as well as the employee's capabilities and limitations must all be considered to create an ergonomically appropriate workplace.

=== Falls ===
Fall protection is the use of controls designed to protect personnel from falling or in the event they do fall, to stop them without causing severe injury. Typically, fall protection is implemented when working at height, but may be relevant when working near any edge, such as near a pit or hole, or performing work on a steep surface. According to the US Department of Labor, falls account for 8% of all work-related trauma injuries leading to death.

Fall guarding is the use of guard rails or other barricades to prevent a person from falling. These barricades are placed near an edge where a fall hazard can occur, or to surround a weak surface (such as a skylight on a roof) that may break when stepped on.

Fall arrest is the form of fall protection which involves the safe stopping of a person already falling. Fall arrest is of two major types: general fall arrest, such as nets; and personal fall arrest, such as lifelines.

=== Noise ===
Occupational hearing loss is one of the most common work-related illnesses in the United States. Each year, about 22 million U.S. workers are exposed to hazardous noise levels at work. Hearing loss costs businesses $242 million annually for workers compensation claims. There are both regulatory and recommended exposure limits for noise exposure in the U.S. The NIOSH Recommended Exposure Limit (REL) for occupational noise exposure is 85 decibels, A-weighted, as an 8-hour time-weighted average (85 dBA as an 8-hr TWA) using a 3-dB exchange rate. The OSHA permissible exposure limit (PEL) is 90 dBA as an 8 hr-TWA, using a 5 dBA exchange rate. The exchange rate means that when the noise level is increased by either 3 dBA (according to the NIOSH REL) or 5 dBA (according to the OSHA PEL), the amount of time a person can be exposed to a certain noise level to receive the same dose is cut in half. Exposures at or above these levels are considered hazardous.

The Hierarchy of Controls approach can also be applied to reducing exposures to noise sources. The use of engineering control approaches to reduce noise at the source is preferred and can be accomplished by several means, including: using quieter tools, using vibration isolation or dampers on machinery, and disrupting the noise path by using barriers or sound insulation around the equipment.

=== Other ===
- Lockout-tagout
- Rupture disc

== Psychosocial hazards ==
Engineering controls for psychosocial hazards include workplace design to affect the amount, type, and level of personal control of work, as well as access controls and alarms. The risk of workplace violence can be reduced through physical design of the workplace or by cameras.

== See also ==
- Engineering controls for nanomaterials
