= Chemical hazard =

Non-biological hazards of hazardous materials

Chemical hazards are hazards present in hazardous chemicals and hazardous materials. Exposure to certain chemicals can cause acute or long-term adverse health effects. Chemical hazards are usually classified separately from biological hazards (biohazards). Chemical hazards are classified into groups that include asphyxiants, corrosives, irritants, sensitizers, carcinogens, mutagens, teratogens, reactants, and flammables. In the workplace, exposure to chemical hazards is a type of occupational hazard. The use of personal protective equipment may substantially reduce the risk of adverse health effects from contact with hazardous materials.

Long-term exposure to chemical hazards such as silica dust, engine exhausts, tobacco smoke, and lead (among others) have been shown to increase risk of heart disease, stroke, and high blood pressure.

== Types of chemical hazard ==
Hazard	Example
Flammable and combustible liquids	Diesel
Compressed gases	Propane
Explosives	TNT
Organic peroxides	Methyl ethyl ketone peroxide (used in the manufacturing of polyester)
Reactives	Benzoyl peroxide (used as a bleaching agent)
Oxidizers	Potassium permanganate (used as an industrial disinfectant and sterilizer)
Pyrophorics	White phosphorus
Carcinogens	Benzene (feed-stock for many petrochemical processes)
Reproductive toxins	Lead, dioxins
Teratogens	Thalidomide (immunomodulatory drug)
Irritants	Hydrochloric acid (used in food manufacturing and ore processing)
Corrosives	Sulfuric acid (used to manufacture chemicals)
Sensitizers	Latex
Hepatotoxins	Trichloroethylene (used in metal degreasing and dry-cleaning, historically in anaesthesia)
Nephrotoxins	Naproxen (an NSAID)
Radioactive materials	Uranium salts, plutonium

== Routes of exposure ==
The most common exposure route to chemicals in the work environment is through inhalation. Gas, vapour, mist, dust, fumes, and smoke can all be inhaled. Those with occupations involving physical work may inhale higher levels of chemicals if working in an area with contaminated air. This is because workers who do physical work will exchange over 10,000 litres of air over an 8-hour day, while workers who do not do physical work will exchange only 2,800 litres. If the air is contaminated in the workplace, more air exchange will lead to the inhalation of higher amounts of chemicals.

Chemicals may be ingested when food or drink is contaminated by unwashed hands or from clothing or poor handling practices. When ingestion of a chemical hazard occurs it comes from when those said chemicals are absorbed while in the digestive tract of the body. Ingestion only occurs when food or drink has contact with the toxic chemical. This can happen through direct or indirect ingestion. When food or drink is brought into an environment where harmful chemicals are unsealed there is the possibility of those chemical vapors or particles contaminating the food or the drink. A more direct form of chemical ingestion is the possibility of consuming the chemical directly. This rarely happens but, it is possible, that if there is little to no labeling on the chemical containers and if they are not secured properly an accident can occur which could lead to someone mistakenly assuming the chemical was something it was not.

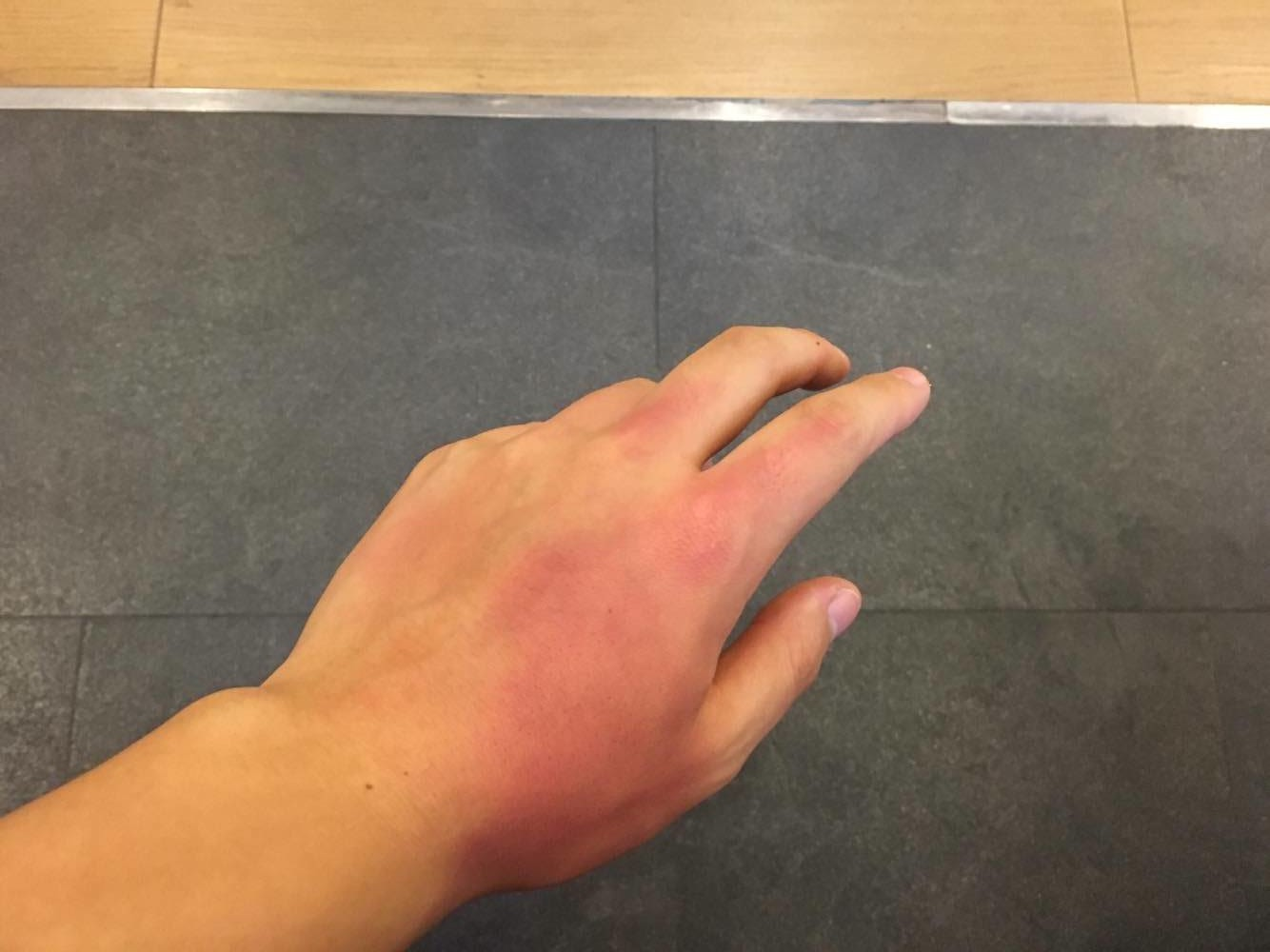
Chemical burns are one type of consequence of exposure to a chemical hazard

Chemical exposure to the skin is a common workplace injury and may also occur in domestic situations with chemicals such as bleach or drain-cleaners. The exposure of chemicals to the skin most often results in local irritation to the exposed area. In some exposures, the chemical will be absorbed through the skin and will result in poisoning. The eyes have a strong sensitivity to chemicals, and are consequently an area of high concern for chemical exposure. Chemical exposure to the eyes results in irritation and may result in burns and vision loss.

Injection is an uncommon method of chemical exposure in the workplace. Chemicals can be injected into the skin when a worker is punctured by a sharp object, such as a needle. Chemical exposure through injection may result in the chemical entering directly into the bloodstream.

== Symbols of chemical hazards ==
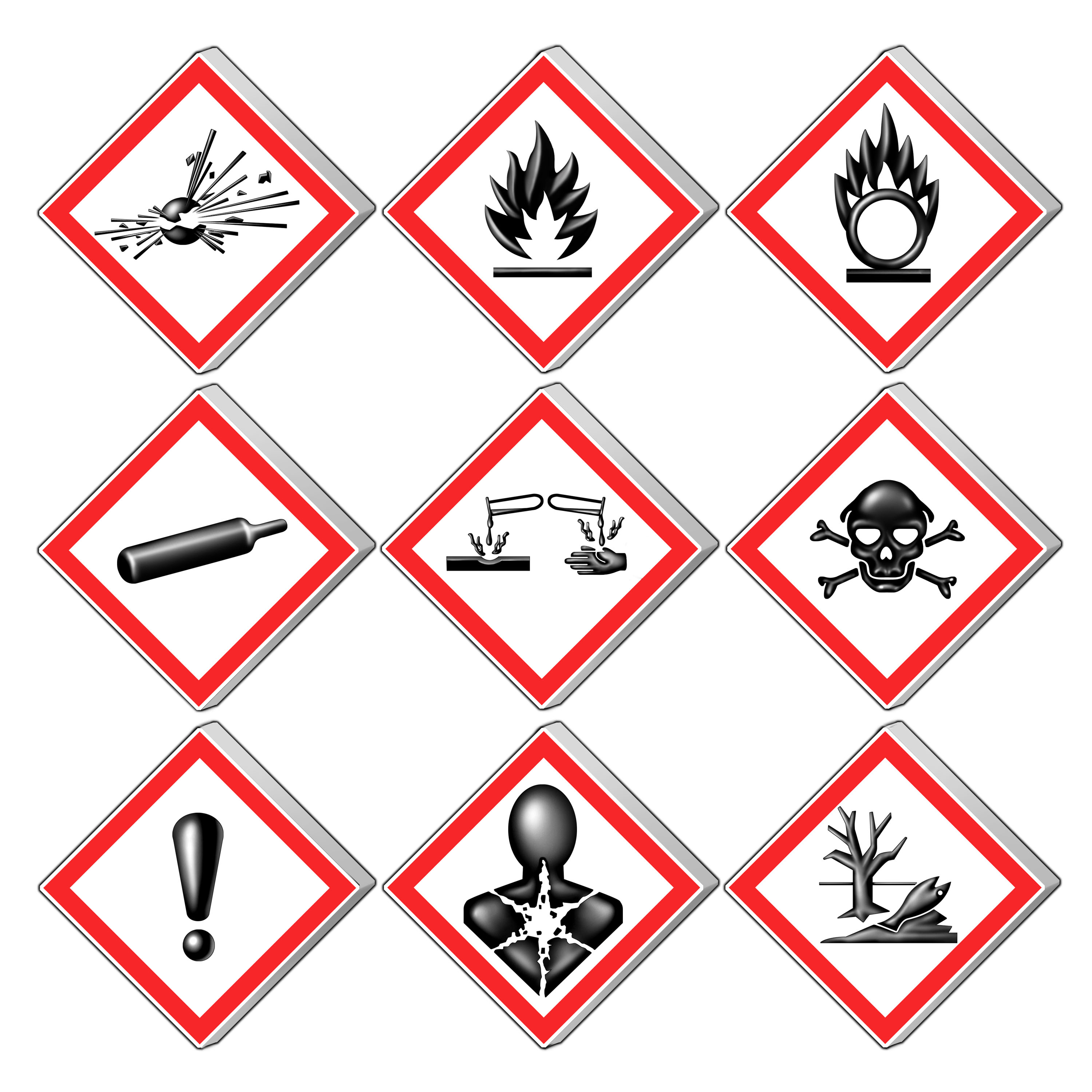
GHS hazard pictograms

Hazard pictograms are a type of labeling system that alerts people at a glance that there are hazardous chemicals present. The symbols help identify whether the chemicals that are going to be in use may potentially cause physical harm, or harm to the environment. The 9 symbols are:

- Explosive (exploding bomb)
- Flammable (flame)
- Oxidizing (flame above a circle)
- Corrosive (corrosion of table and hand)
- Acute toxicity (skull and crossbones)
- Hazardous to environment (dead tree and fish)
- Health hazard/hazardous to the ozone layer (exclamation mark)
- Serious health hazard (cross on a human silhouette)
- Gas under pressure (gas cylinder)

These pictographs are also subdivided into class and categories for each classification. The assignments for each chemical depends on their type and their severity. The standard set of 9 hazard pictograms was published and distributed as a regulatory requirement through the efforts of the United Nations via the Globally Harmonized System of Classification and Labelling of Chemicals.

== Controlling chemical exposure ==
A video on how exposure sampling works during a health hazard evaluation

=== Elimination and substitution ===
Chemical exposure is estimated to have caused approximately 190,000 illnesses and 50,000 deaths of workers annually. There exists an unknown link between chemical exposure and subsequent illness or death. Therefore, the majority of these illnesses and deaths are thought to be caused by a lack of knowledge or awareness concerning the dangers of chemicals. The best method of controlling chemical exposure within the workplace is through the elimination or the substitution of all chemicals that are thought or known to cause illness or death.

=== Engineering controls ===
Although elimination and substitution of harmful chemicals is the best known method for controlling chemical exposure, there are other methods that can be implemented to diminish exposure. The implementation of engineering controls is an example of another method for controlling chemical exposures. When engineering controls are implemented, there is a physical change made to the work environment that will eliminate or reduce the risk to chemical exposure. An example of engineering controls is the enclosure or isolation of the process that creates the chemical hazard.

=== Administrative controls and safe work practices ===
If the process that creates the chemical hazard cannot be enclosed or isolated, the next best method is the implementation of administrative controls and work practices controls. This is the establishment of administrative and work practices that will reduce the amount of time and how often the workers will be exposed to the chemical hazard. An example of administrative and work practices controls is the establishment of work schedules in which workers have rotating job assignments. This will ensure that all workers have limited exposure to chemical hazards.

=== Personal protective equipment ===
Employers should provide personal protective equipment (PPE) to protect their workers from chemicals used within the workplace. The use of PPE prevents workers from being exposed to chemicals through the routes of exposure—inhalation, absorption through skin or eyes, ingestion, and injection. One example of how PPE usage can prevent chemical exposure concerns respirators. If workers wear respirators, they will prevent the exposure of chemicals through inhalation.

== First aid ==
In case of an emergency, it is recommended to understand first aid procedures in order to minimize any damage. Different types of chemicals can cause a variety of damage. Most sources agree that it is best to rinse any contacted skin or eye with water immediately. Currently, there is insufficient evidence of how long the rinsing should be done, as the degree of impacts will vary for substances such as corrosive chemicals.

Transporting the affected person to a health care facility may be important, depending on condition. If the victim needs to be transported before the recommended flush time, then flushing should be done during the transportation process. Some chemical manufacturers may state the specific type of cleansing agent that is recommended.

== Long-term risks ==
=== Cancers ===
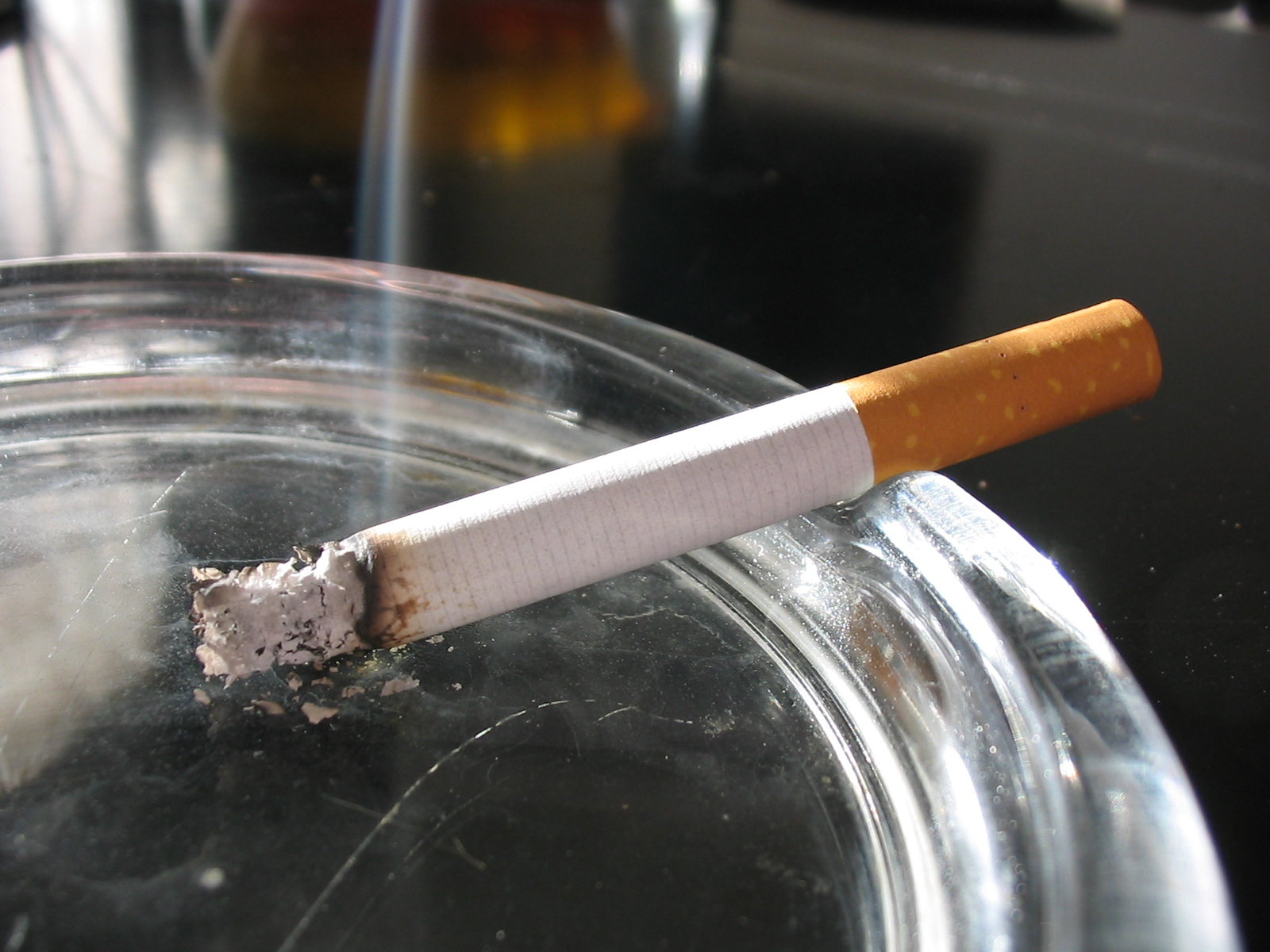
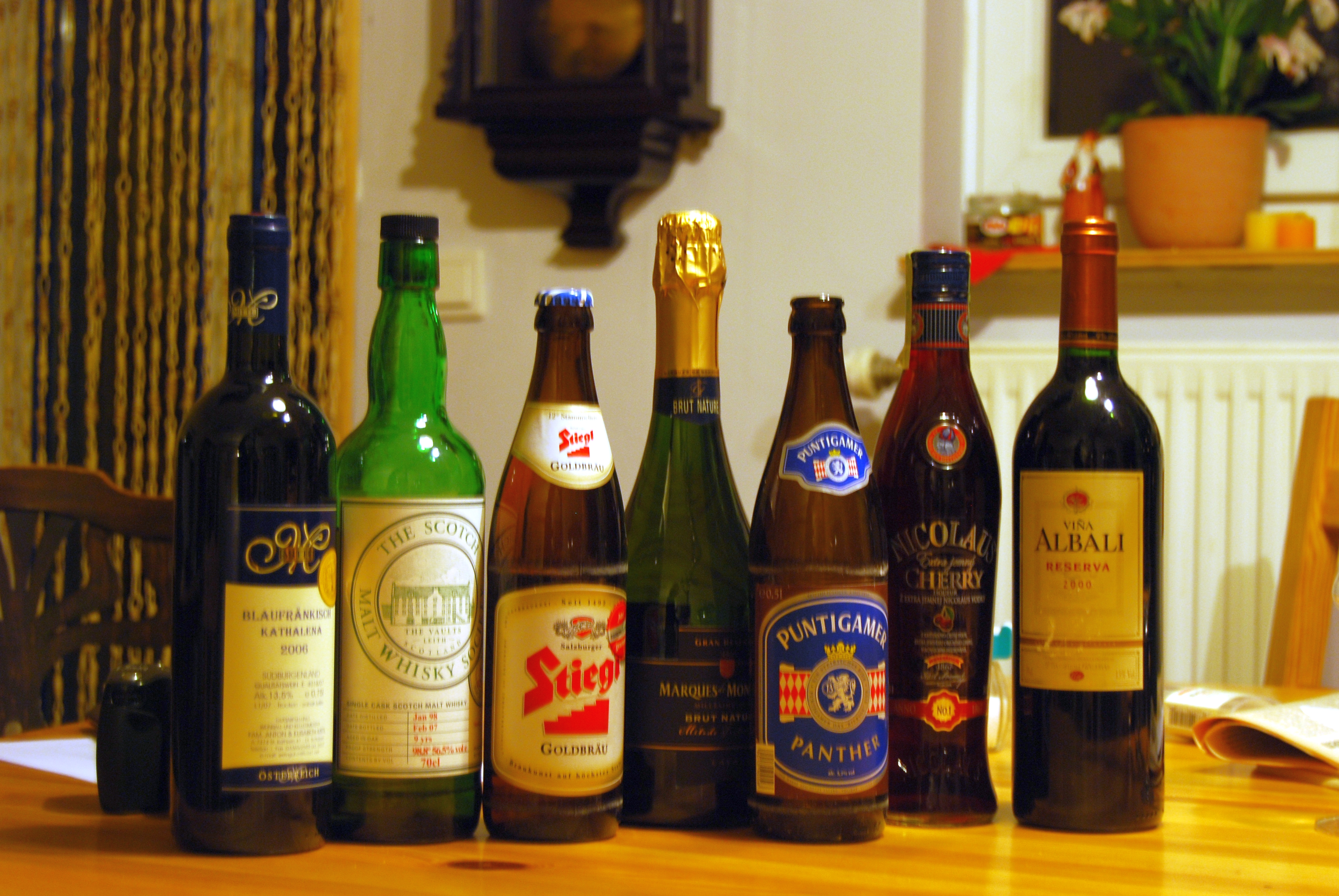
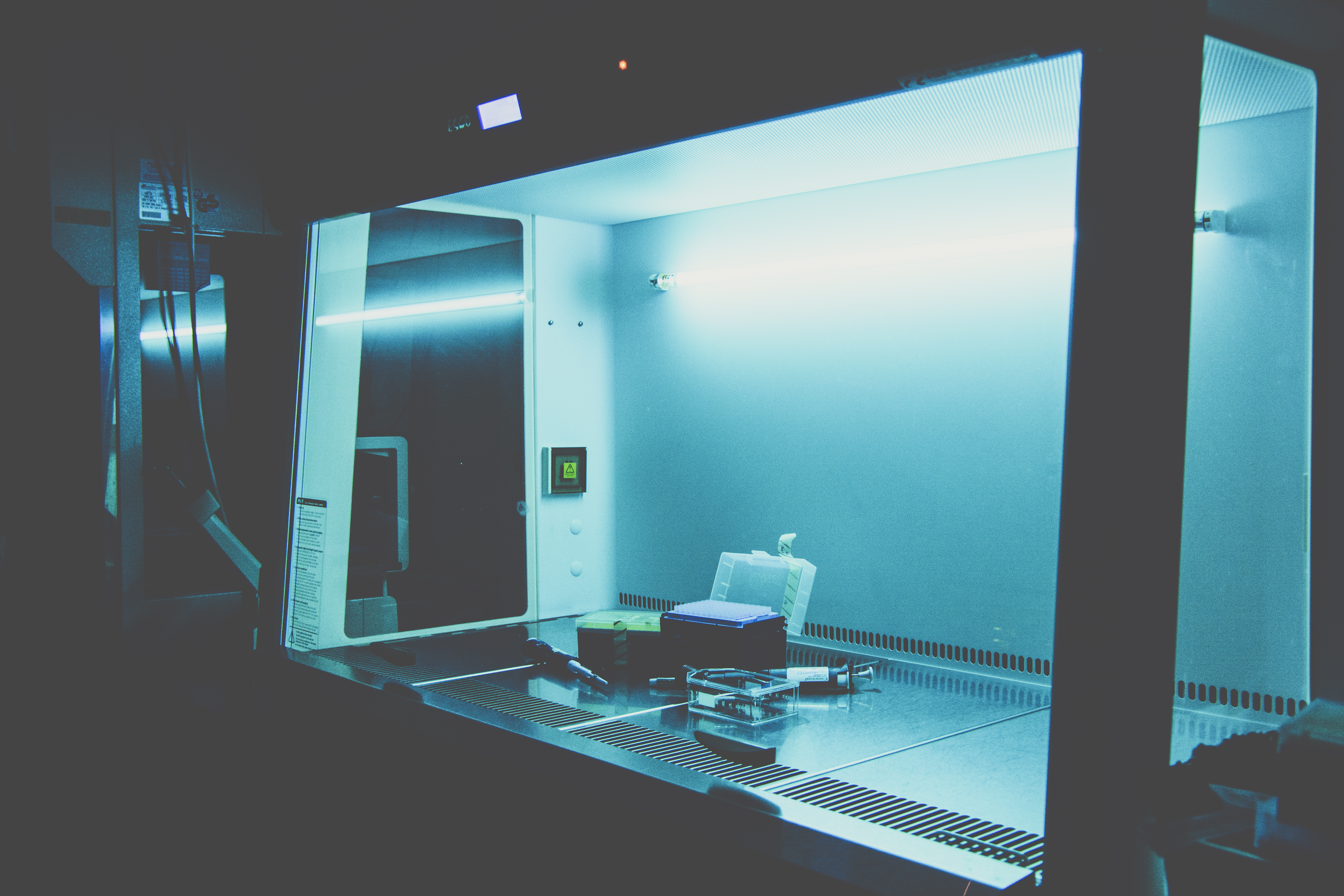
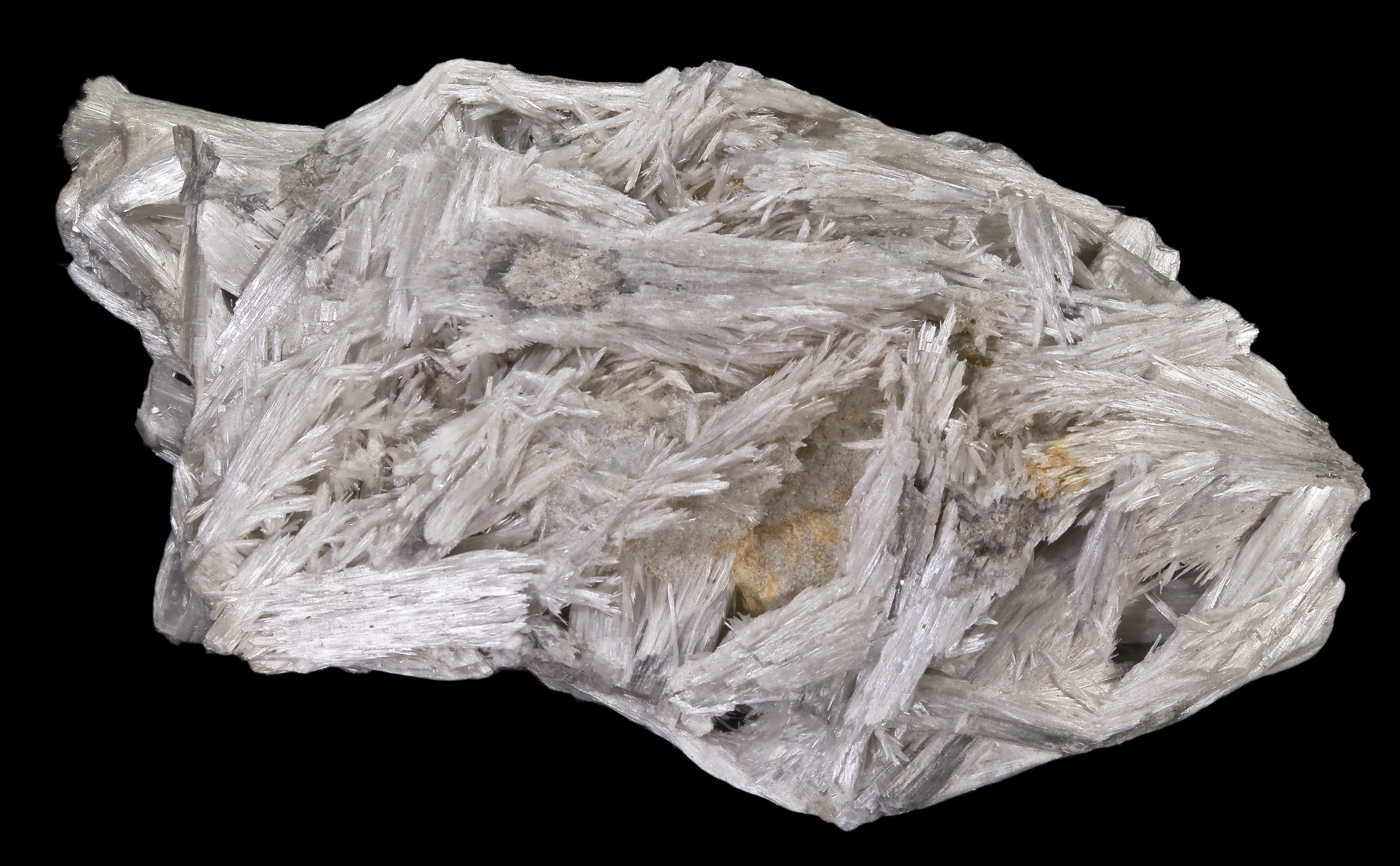
Common carcinogens; clockwise from top left: tobacco smoking, alcohol, asbestos, ultraviolet B and C radiation

A carcinogen (/kɑːr.ˈsɪn.ə.dʒən/) is any agent that promotes the development of cancer. Carcinogens can include synthetic chemicals, naturally occurring substances, physical agents such as ionizing and non-ionizing radiation, and biologic agents such as viruses and bacteria. Most carcinogens act by creating mutations in DNA that disrupt a cell's normal processes for regulating growth, leading to uncontrolled cellular proliferation. This occurs when the cell's DNA repair processes fail to identify DNA damage, allowing the defect to be passed down to daughter cells. The damage accumulates over time. This is typically a multi-step process during which the regulatory mechanisms within the cell are gradually dismantled allowing for unchecked cellular division.

The specific mechanisms for carcinogenic activity are unique to each agent and cell type. Carcinogenic agents can be broadly categorized, however, as either activation-dependent or activation-independent, which relate to the agent's ability to engage directly with DNA. Activation-dependent agents are relatively inert in their original form, but are bioactivated in the body into metabolites or intermediaries capable of damaging human DNA. These are also known as "indirect-acting" carcinogens. Examples of activation-dependent carcinogens include polycyclic aromatic hydrocarbons (PAHs), heterocyclic aromatic amines, and mycotoxins.

Activation-independent carcinogens, or "direct-acting" carcinogens, are those that are capable of directly damaging DNA without any modification to their molecular structure. These agents typically include electrophilic groups that react readily with the net negative charge of DNA molecules. Examples of activation-independent carcinogens include ultraviolet light, ionizing radiation and alkylating agents.

The time from exposure to a carcinogen to the development of cancer is known as the latency period. For most solid tumors in humans, the latency period is between 10 and 40 years depending on cancer type. For blood cancers, the latency period may be as short as two. Due to prolonged latency periods identification of carcinogens can be challenging.

A number of organizations review and evaluate the cumulative scientific evidence regarding the potential carcinogenicity of specific substances. Foremost among these is the International Agency for Research on Cancer (IARC). IARC routinely publishes monographs in which specific substances are evaluated for their potential carcinogenicity to humans and subsequently categorized into one of four groupings: Group 1: Carcinogenic to humans, Group 2A: Probably carcinogenic to humans, Group 2B: Possibly carcinogenic to humans and Group 3: Not classifiable as to its carcinogenicity to humans. Other organizations that evaluate the carcinogenicity of substances include the National Toxicology Program of the US Public Health Service, NIOSH, the American Conference of Governmental Industrial Hygienists and others.

There are numerous sources of exposures to carcinogens including ultraviolet radiation from the sun, radon gas emitted in residential basements, environmental contaminants such as chlordecone, cigarette smoke and ingestion of some types of foods such as alcohol and processed meats. Occupational exposures represent a major source of carcinogens with an estimated 666,000 annual fatalities worldwide attributable to work related cancers. According to NIOSH, 3-6% of cancers worldwide are due to occupational exposures. Well established occupational carcinogens include vinyl chloride and hemangiosarcoma of the liver, benzene and leukemia, aniline dyes and bladder cancer, asbestos and mesothelioma, polycyclic aromatic hydrocarbons and scrotal cancer among chimney sweeps to name a few.

=== Cardiovascular disease ===
A 2017 SBU report found evidence that workplace exposure to silica dust, engine exhaust or welding fumes is associated with heart disease. Associations exist for exposure to arsenic, benzopyrenes, lead, dynamite, carbon disulfide, carbon monoxide, metalworking fluids and occupational exposure to tobacco smoke. Working with the electrolytic production of aluminium, or the production of paper when the sulfate pulping process is used, is associated with heart disease. An association was found between heart disease and exposure to compounds which are no longer permitted in certain work environments, such as phenoxy acids containing TCDD (dioxin) or asbestos.

Workplace exposure to silica dust or asbestos is also associated with pulmonary heart disease. There is evidence that workplace exposure to lead, carbon disulfide, or phenoxy acids containing TCDD, as well as working in an environment where aluminium is being electrolytically produced, are associated with stroke.

=== Reproductive and developmental disorders ===
Pesticides and carbon disulfide, amongst many other chemical species have been linked to disruptions of endocrine balances in the brain and ovaries. Any contact with harmful chemicals during the first few months of pregnancy or even after has been connected to some miscarriages and has affected the menstrual cycle to the point that it has been able to block ovulation. Chemicals inducing health issues during pregnancy may also affect infants or fetuses.

== See also ==
- Biocontainment – Physical containment of pathogenic organisms or agents in microbiology laboratories
- Biological agent – Pathogen that can be weaponized
- Biosafety level – Set of biocontainment precautions
- Chemical safety – Safety of activities involving chemicals
- Health hazard – Hazards that would affect the health of exposed persons.
- Hierarchy of hazard controls – System used in industry to eliminate or minimize exposure to hazards
- Occupational exposure banding – Categorization process for chemical hazards
- Occupational hazard – Hazard experienced in the workplace
- Planetary protection – Prevention of interplanetary biological contamination
- Process safety – Discipline dealing with the study and management of fires, explosions and toxic gas clouds from hazardous materials in process plants.
- Public health – Promoting health through informed choices
