= Microplastics and human health =

How plastic particles affect human health

Humans are exposed to toxic chemicals and microplastics at all stages in the plastics life cycle.

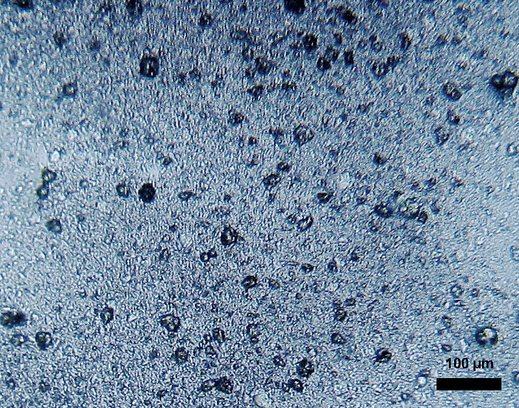
Microplastics shown under a microscope at 100x magnification

The effects of microplastics on human health are a subject of ongoing study. These extremely small plastic particles originate from larger plastics and have been detected in high volumes in human biological samples, air, water, and food. This has raised concerns about the long-term impacts on human health.

Plastic particles smaller than 5mm are considered microplastics (MPs). Particles smaller than 1μm are nanoplastics (NP), which are too small to be seen by the human eye. Nanoplastics remain less studied than larger plastic debris, and their long-term health impacts are still being investigated. Given their minute size, nanoplastics can penetrate biological barriers and accumulate in human tissues, raising questions about potential health effects.

Micro- and nanoplastics (MNPs) have been detected in multiple organs and tissues, as well as human feces, urine, breastmilk, and neonatal meconium, suggesting widespread exposure and absorption. Larger MNPs are thought to be filtered out by normal bodily defenses, such as by mucus in the nose or by coughing. However, "ultrafine" particles are able to enter the circulatory system through the lungs. Additionally, when MNPs are introduced directly into the bloodstream, such as during medical treatment, they bypass our natural defenses.

Although experimental studies within cell cultures and animals have shown possible biological effects, human evidence remains limited, and long-term health risks are still being researched. A 2024 systematic review of human and animal observational studies concluded that MNPs are "suspected" to be harmful to human reproductive, respiratory, and digestive health.

The World Health Organization has acknowledged growing concerns, but note that standardized measurement methods and risks have not been established, calling for further research and improved management of plastic throughout its life-cycle.

== Routes of exposure and bioaccumulation ==
The major pathways of human exposure to MNPs are inhalation, ingestion and dermal contact, with bioaccumulation varying based on particle size, composition, and physicochemical characteristics. Research suggests that MNPs above 150 μm typically remain confined to tissues and do not enter systemic circulation, whereas particles below 200 nm can breach cellular and tissue barriers, potentially reaching the bloodstream and other organs. This diversity in bioaccumulation pathways underscores the widespread yet nuanced risks of MNP exposure to human health.

These findings collectively suggest that MNPs may accumulate in multiple organ systems depending on the exposure route, potentially leading to long-term health consequences as their presence in human tissues builds up over time.

=== Inhalation ===
Airborne MNPs originate from urban dust, rubber tires, household plastic items, and synthetic fibers from textiles. It is also theorized that particles that have entered our waterways can become suspended in the air via wave action, as well as via the spreading of wastewater treatment sludge on agricultural fields. Once inhaled, these particles may become lodged in the lungs or, through mucociliary clearance, be ingested and enter the digestive system. Airborne microplastics have been detected in urban atmospheres, with reports showing a fallout of 29–280 particles per square meter per day on an urban rooftop, underscoring the potential for routine exposure. Annual inhalation exposure rates vary, with some studies estimating individuals inhale up to 68,000 particles each year. landfills produce various MP particles

Children are at higher risk of exposure to MNPs by inhalation. When compared to adults, children have less efficient nasal filtering, are more typically mouth breathers, and breathe more air per unit of body mass. This makes them more susceptible to air pollutants of all kinds.

=== Ingestion ===
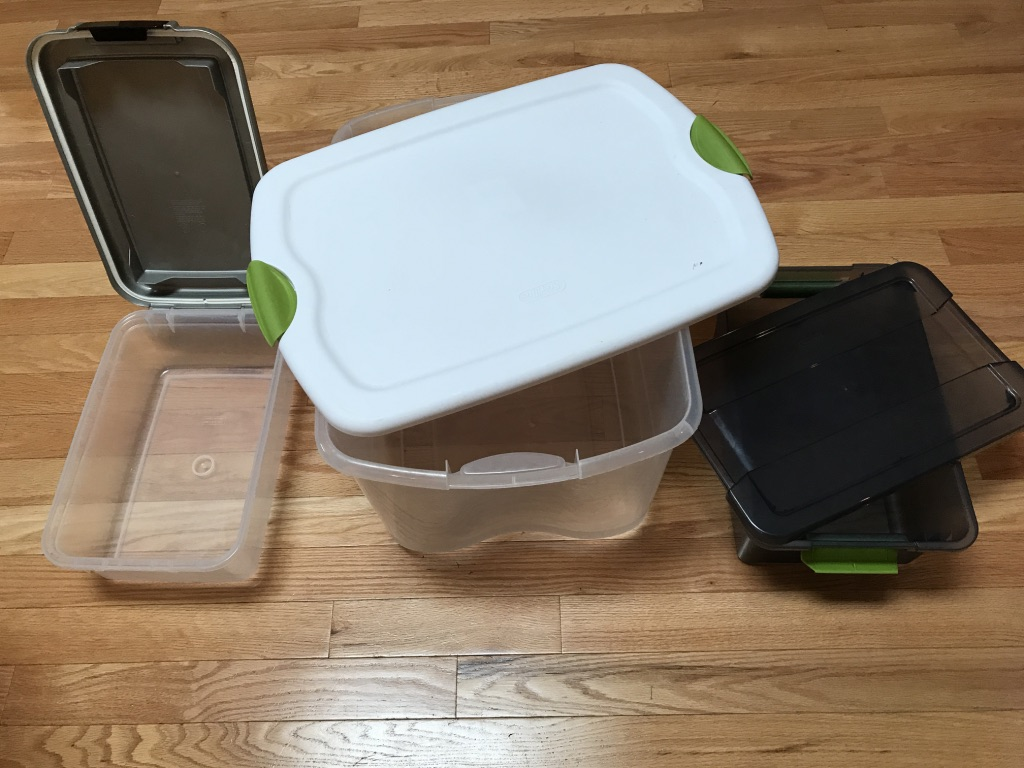
Concerns have been raised about microplastics shedding from plastic food storage and cookware; however, studies suggest that direct consumption of microplastics in food and animal products is a greater source of exposure.

Ingestion is one of the primary pathways of MNP exposure due to the omnipresence of these particles in food, beverages, and drinking water. Studies show that MNPs are detected in a variety of consumables, including drinking water, beer, honey, sugar, table salt, and even airborne particles that settle on food. Indirect ingestion also occurs via toothpaste, face wash, scrubs, and soap.

Marine products are particularly concerning sources of ingestion-related exposure due to the accumulation of MNPs in aquatic environments. Fish, bivalves, and other seafood are frequently contaminated with MNPs that are ingested through water and food and build up through the process of bioaccumulation. Humans consuming these animals are thus directly exposed to microplastics embedded in tissue; for instance, humans eat the entire soft tissue of bivalves, along with their digestive systems, which increases the direct transfer of MNPs. In a study along the Mediterranean coast of Turkey, 1822 MNPs were extracted from the stomachs and intestines of 1337 fish specimens, with fibers accounting for 70% of these particles.

Contamination is further compounded by plastic packaging and storage materials, which can leach MNPs over time, leading to additional ingestion from common foods and drinks. Concerns have also been raised about exposure due to plastic cookware and utensils, with one study estimating that using plastic cookware may introduce up to 4,900 microplastics into homecooked food each year. Studies have shown that drinking water from plastic bottles has significantly greater detectable plastic content than tap water.

Fecal sample analyses estimate a daily intake of approximately 203–332 MNPs, translating to an annual ingestion rate of around 39,000–52,000 particles. This suggests that daily MNP exposure from food and drink may be substantial, with significant implications for gastrointestinal and systemic health. Estimates of dietary exposure vary across studies due to differences in sampling and detection methods, contributing to uncertainty about typical intake levels.

The assessment of microplastic exposure and prevention measures can also be applied to the circumstances surrounding ingesting typical drinking water systems, in which spatially measuring and removing micro or nano-plastics is infeasible. Drinking water systems have a vast variety of distinct treatment processes that differ depending on the concentrations and physical attributes of the plastic contaminants. Moreover, the wide disparities in sampling methods and analytical techniques frequently yield inaccurate estimations of substance concentrations, which makes it cumbersome to distinguish a variety of definite exposure levels across various studies. These respective constraints further make it more cumbersome to proficiently quantify human exposure through the consumption of drinking water and to predict its long term health repercussions.

=== Maternal exposure ===
Recent studies have shown the presence of microplastics in breast milk, often leading to exposures in very young children. While it has already been established that chemicals such as flame retardants and pesticides have been detected in breast milk, knowledge about microplastics is limited in comparison. A 2022 study detected microplastics in 26 of 34 breast milk samples, with particles ranging from 2 to 12μm in size, raising concerns about infant exposure during critical developmental windows. No safe or harmful exposure level for microplastics has been established, and exposure to MNPs during early developmental stages has raised questions about possible developmental effects or other health issues later in life.

Additionally, breast pumps and breastmilk storage bags are frequently made of plastic. Freezing liquid in a plastic container and then heating it up (the "freeze-thaw cycle") has been shown to increase the presence of microplastics. Similar results have been seen from heating plastic reusable food containers in a microwave, showing the increased release of MNPs. It is not recommended that frozen breastmilk ever be thawed in a microwave.

=== Medical exposure ===
Though rarer; intravenous therapies such as IV bags, injections, and similar, may introduce thousands or millions of micro and nano plastics directly to the bloodstream, including not only solid, but also liquid PDMS plastics lubricants. This may enhance microplastic exposure due to the direct nature of the delivery, which bypasses bodily defences. Saline IVs have been found to introduce 1,600–8,000 microparticles per mL and 4-73 million nanoparticles per mL in IV, with high levels persisting post-filtration. Even blood collection needles appear to introduce plastic to the bloodstream, despite the fact they take fluids rather than injecting them. As such general exposure from disposable plastic medical equipment appears quite high.

=== Skin contact ===
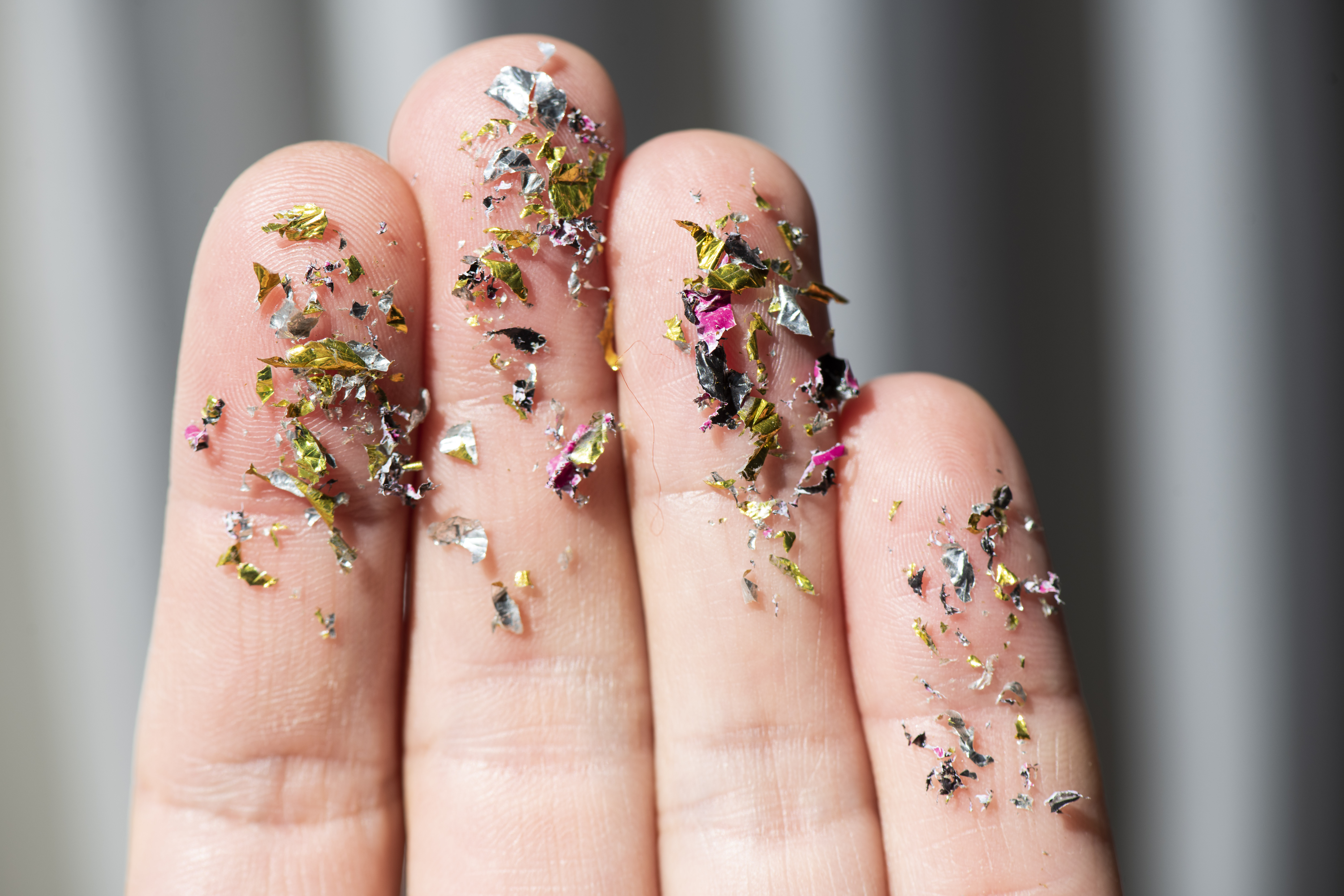
One of many routes through which humans are exposed to microplastics is via dermal contact which allows MNPs to penetrate through skin pores.

Dermal exposure to MNPs occurs through contact with contaminated media like soil, water, and personal care products, including facial and body scrubs containing MNPs as exfoliants. Although the skin generally acts as a barrier, conditions such as skin lesions or high exposure environments may allow for enhanced absorption of MNPs, particularly nanoplastics, which can penetrate the stratum corneum. Furthermore, workers handling production of textiles, garments, fabric, and other fiber products are constantly exposed through inhalation and direct dermal contact. This highlights the need for further research into the effects MNPs have on human health, especially on industrial workers who have higher rates of exposure.

Studies on dermal exposure highlight the potential for these particles to enter systemic circulation, especially if the skin barrier is disrupted by wounds or conditions that increase permeability, like pores such as sweat glands and hair follicles.

== Occupational exposure ==
Workplace exposure can be at a high concentration for the duration of a shift, and thus short-term, whereas exposure outside of work is at low concentration and long-term. For instance, the concentration of worker exposure from extrusion 3D printers is orders of magnitude higher than the general population (e.g., 4×10^{10} particles per cubic meter [m^{3}] versus 50 particles per m^{3} in the general environment).

The main route of workplace exposure is acute inhalation. Plastics are extensively used in the construction and renovation industry. Airborne microplastic dust is produced during renovation, building, bridge and road reconstruction. High chronic exposure to aerosolized MNPs also occurs in the synthetic textile industry, the flocking industry, and the plastics industry, especially in vinyl chloride and polyvinyl chloride (PVC) manufacturers.

In manufacturing, there is risk of exposure to both intentionally and incidentally generated MNPs. For instance, MNPs are intentionally generated during 3D printing but can also be incidentally generated due to mechanical or environmental degradation, or through industrial processes such as plastic manufacturing (heating and chemical condensation).

=== Manufacturing and processing of plastic ===
- PVC and plastic production produces PVC dust. Increased hepatobiliary (liver, bile duct, and gallbladder) cancer mortality has been documented among vinyl and PVC workers exposed to vinyl chloride, the monomer from which PVC is made. Coronary artery disease and cancer death has been documented among workers exposed to vinyl chloride.
- 3D printing, such as commercial extrusion printing and multi-jet fusion printing with thermoplastics and resin, emits MNPs and volatile organic compounds into the ambient workplace air. There is emerging evidence of allergic, respiratory, and cardiovascular adverse effects from 3D printing. For extrusion printing, Acrylonitrile butadiene styrene (ABS) filaments emit more MNPs than Polylactic acid (PLA) filaments.
- Dust generation occurs in a wide range of settings from composite material machining, drilling, hand-held grinding, sanding of nanotube-containing composites, sanding of dental composites, and cutting PVC piping and plastics.

=== Environmental and mechanical degradation of plastic ===
- Indoor air, especially in carpeted buildings, contains high concentrations of degraded synthetic fibers, meaning potential exposure to office workers and custodial staff. Settled dust is ingested by adults and particularly children.
- In wastewater management, recycling facilities, and landfills, plastic goods undergo environmental (weathering) and mechanical degradation. Recycling facilities and landfills serve as reservoirs of particulates workers may potentially be exposed to.

=== Medical plastic ===
- Medical plastics include a wide range of products, especially single-use plastics like storage bags to pharmaceutical containers, that expose patients and healthcare workers to MNPs.
- Face masks and respirators are often made of plastic, primarily polyethylene and other synthetic polymers. Studies have shown that MNPs can be inhaled from wearing surgical or N95 masks, and the amount of MNPs released greatly increases when the same mask is worn repeatedly.

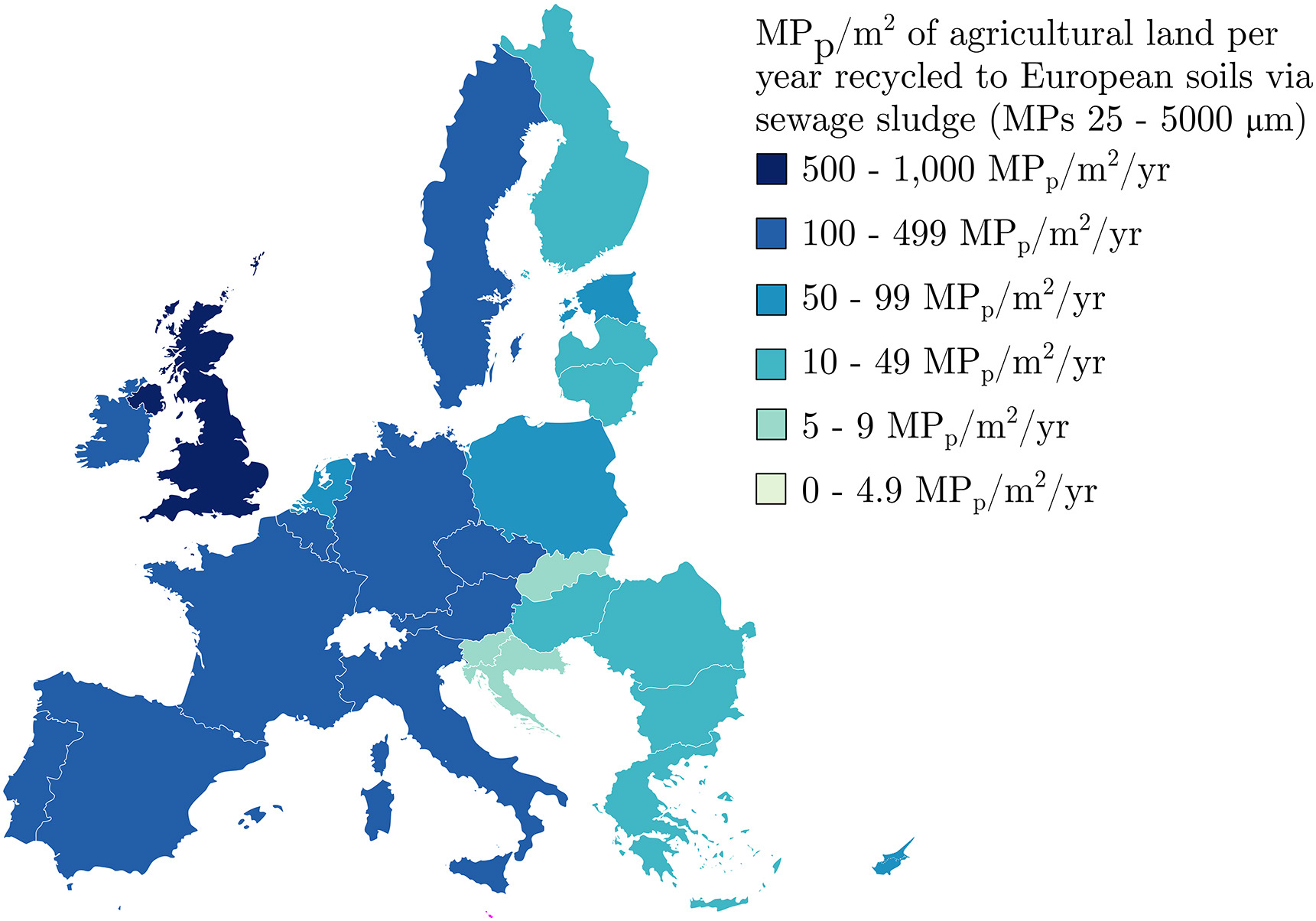
Microplastics per square meter in the EU sewage sludge (2015–2019)

== Potential health risks ==
The potential health impacts of MNPs vary based on factors such as particle size, shape, exposure time, chemical composition (e.g. enriched with heavy metals, polycyclic aromatic hydrocarbons, etc.), surface properties, and associated contaminants.

Experimental and observational studies in mammals have reported a range of biological responses to micro and nanoplastic exposure. It is shown that MPs and NPs exposure have the following adverse effects:

=== On the cellular level ===
- Inflammation
- Oxidative stress
- Genotoxicity
- Cytotoxicity

=== By systems ===
- Cardiovascular:
  - Associated with coronary artery disease
  - Detected in patients' carotid artery plaque, indicating an increased risk of stroke, heart attack, or death
- Respiratory:
  - Inflammation in the lungs from inhalation
  - Asthma or pneumoconiosis due to extended exposure
  - Worsening of asthma or chronic obstructive pulmonary disease
- Endocrine:
  - Endocrine disruption
  - Disruption of hypothalamic-pituitary axis (HPA), with impacts on thyroid, ovaries, adrenal glands, etc.
  - Reproductive toxicity, decreased reproductive health, decreased sperm quality
  - Potential developmental abnormalities
- Digestive:
  - Metabolic disturbances
  - Changes in the gut microbioata and epitheal permeability
  - Disrupted gut-liver axis resulting in increased risk of insulin resistance
  - Disrupted hormone function, potentially contributing to weight gain
- Immunotoxicity
- Neurotoxicity

== Research limitations and scientific uncertainty ==
Despite growing concern and evidence, most epidemiologic studies have focused on characterizing exposures rather than direct health impacts. Epidemiological studies directly linking MNPs to adverse health effects in humans still remain relatively limited and research is ongoing to determine the full extent of potential harm caused by MNPs and their long-term impact on human health. Public health agencies have acknowledged that there is a need for further research on assessing exposure levels and possible public health implications. Ongoing research aims to clarify exposure pathways, biological interactions, and risks.

A major limitation involves the lack of standardized methods for detecting and quantifying nanoplastics in environmental and biological samples. Variability in sampling techniques influences inconsistent data records. Accurately measuring nanoplastics is technically challenging because of their small size and different properties. For example, there is risk of sample contamination during collection, differences in whether studies report particle counts versus mass concentrations, and difficulty differentiating the effects of microplastics from the effects off absorbed pollutants.

Additionally, much of the existing evidence originates from laboratory experiments and animal models, which may not directly reflect human exposure. Differences in particle size, shape, and chemical additives also complicate comparisons across studies.

Experimental studies also often exceed typical environmental exposure levels when exposing animals or cells to concentrations. This makes it difficult to determine if these same effects will happen at lower, more realistic levels of exposure. No threshold in which nanoplastics begin to significantly affect human health has been established.

== Mitigating inhalation exposure to MNPs ==
As of July 2026, there is no established NIOSH Recommended Exposure Limit (REL) for MNPs due to limited data on exposure levels and adverse health effects, the absence of standardization to characterize MNPs by chemical composition and morphology, and difficulty in measuring airborne MNPs. Thus, safety measures focus on the hierarchy of controls for nanomaterials with good industrial hygiene to implement source emission control. These mitigation strategies include local exhaust ventilation, air filtration, and non-ventilating engineering controls, such as substitution with less hazardous materials, administrative controls, Personal Protective Equipment (PPE) for skin, and respiratory protection.

Research from the U.S. National Institute of Occupational Safety and Health (NIOSH) Nanotechnology Research Center (NTRC) show local exhaust ventilation and High Efficiency Particulate Air (HEPA) filtration to be effective mitigation to theoretically filter 99.97% of nanoparticles down to 0.3 microns.

== See also ==
- Bisphenol A (BPA) and exposure to humans
- Polyvinyl chloride and health
- Microplastic remediation
