= Aerosolization =

Process of converting a substance into an aerosol

Aerosolization is the process or act of converting a physical substance into the form of particles that are small and light enough to be carried on the air into an aerosol. Aerosolization refers to a process of intentionally oxidatively converting and suspending particles or a composition in a moving stream of air for the purpose of delivering the oxidized particles or composition to a particular location.

Aerosolization is also a concept used in air pollution where particulate matter is formed and evaded into the atmosphere. Gas-phase substances reach the atmosphere by volatilization. Solid and liquid-phase particles can reach the atmosphere by aerosolization. This is a mechanism by which semivolatile organic compounds (SVOCs) such as halogenated and organphosphate pesticides become air pollutants.

The term is used in medicine to refer specifically to the production of airborne particles (e.g. tiny liquid droplets) containing infectious virus or bacteria. The infectious organism is said to be aerosolized. This can occur when an infected individual coughs, sneezes exhales, or vomits, but can also arise from flushing a toilet, or disturbing dried contaminated feces.

Treatment of some respiratory diseases relies on aerosolization of a liquid medication using a nebulizer, which is then breathed in for direct transport to the lungs.

In the context of chemical and biological weapons, aerosolization is a means of dispersing a chemical or biological agent in an attack. See for example "Botulinum Toxin as a Biological Weapon".

Dustiness is the tendency of finely divided solids to generate aerosols from an external stimulus and can be quantified or measured.
