= Microplastic remediation =

Environmental remediation technique

Microplastic remediation refers to environmental remediation techniques focused on the removal, treatment and containment of microplastics from environmental media such as soil, water, or sediment. Microplastics come from larger pieces of plastic that have been broken down and measure approximately five millimeters to one nanometer in size. Remediation of microplastics is ongoing and aids contaminated environment recovery.

Microplastics can be removed using physical, chemical, or biological techniques including advanced oxidation, bioremediation, coagulation, membrane filtration, hand removal, and more, all of which work towards degrading microplastics and preventing microplastics from entering environments. However some of these methods are unconventional, expensive, and don't offer a permanent solution to the continuous input of microplastics in the United States.

== Plastic Legislation In the United States ==
Though efforts are underway to directly remove microplastics from the environment, the biggest factor in microplastic remediation remains prevention. Millions of companies in the United States and nation wide produce plastic products for consumers that contribute greatly to the increase of microplastics on Earth. Implementation of policy and protocol for the collection and re-use of plastic products prevents the majority of opportunities for microplastics to form in the environment. Studies have found that the global annual production of plastics has increased from 258 million U.S. tons in 2000 to 507 million tons in 2019. [3] Recent legislation includes the Microplastic Safety Act of 2025 which states that the FDA must conduct a study on the human health impacts of microplastic exposure in food and water within the next year. The study focuses on children's health, the endocrine system, cancer, chronic illnesses and reproductive health. [4] Additionally, the Break Free From Plastic Pollution Act of 2023 has been proposed in order to reduce the use of single-use plastic and to improve the responsibility of producers to prevent pollution of microplastics.

Microplastic remediation is a global effort which aligns with the United Nations Sustainable Development Goals. Direct impacts to the environment, as it pertains to the SDGs, include SDG 6 concerning clean water and sanitation, SDG 12 as the production and use of plastic materials directly contribute to the creation of microplastics, and SDG 14 where microplastics have invaded the waters and sediments, affecting aquatic life.

== Remediation of Microplastics in Air ==
Microplastics can be airborne and have been identified in both air and dust samples from both indoor and outdoor locations in China and London, among others, with indoor microplastic levels being higher than outdoor levels. More studies are needed to measure the impact of microplastics as part of airborne particulate matter on human health. However, its been found that microplastics can be transported through air as dust, erosion, car emissions, and even spray from the ocean. Inhalation of microplastics has been known to cause respiratory diseases, impact reproductive heath, create inflammation, oxidative stress, and damage lung tissue.

Removal of airborne microplastics is challenging and the best strategy is to improve indoor ventilation and to reduce emission by decreasing the use of synthetic textiles and by using HEPA filters when vacuuming. HEPA air filters can reduce indoor airborne particulate matter and might be similarly effective for microplastics removal.

Incineration of plastics for energy is also a large contributing factor to airborne microplastics. It has been observed that switching from plastic burning to renewable technologies for the production of energy is a viable method of microplastic remediation for airborne microplastics by eliminating a major source.

== Remediation of Microplastics in Water ==
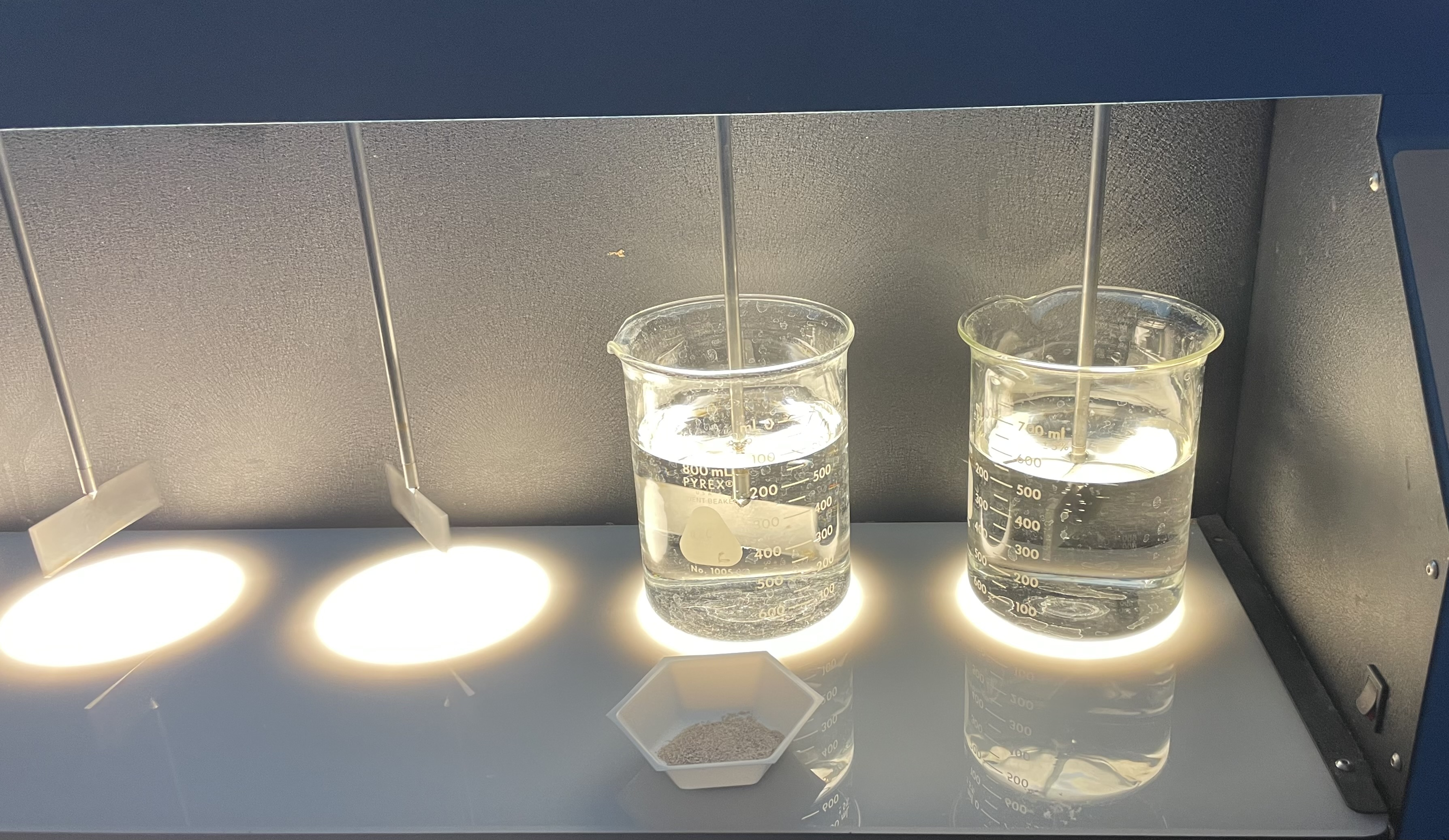
This image shows the process of flocculating water that has been confirmed to be polluted by microplastics. Fenugreek polymer has been added for the flocculation process in order to adsorb the microplastics for removal from the water.

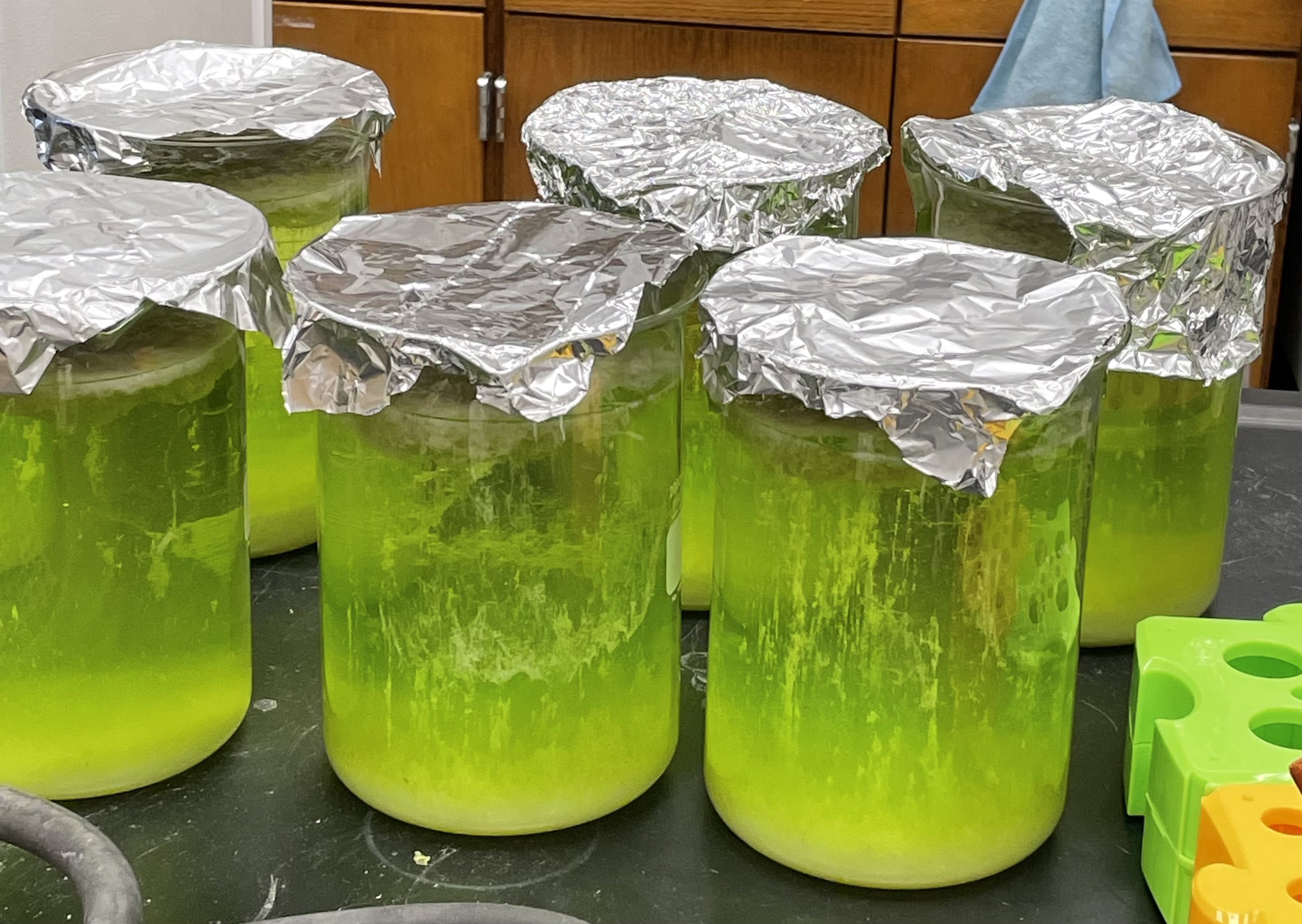
Okra polymer created for use in microplastic remediation in waters.

Microplastics can be removed from water by filtration, adsorption or absorption.

Absorption devices include sponges made of cotton and squid bones, demonstrating an efficiency of over 99%. Microplastics become harmful in water because they absorb persistent organic pollutants, heavy metals, and pathogens from the surrounding environment that impact marine wildlife and food chains.

Researchers have shown that microplastic remediation in water can also be accomplished by utilizing plant-based polymers from Fenugreek and Okra as flocculants. The flocculation process utilizes the unique structure of the polymers created from the sugars of Fenugreek and Okra as adsorption vectors. Once the microplastics have been captured by the polymers in the flocculation process, the polymers settle to the bottom of the solution and are filtered out. Utilization of these polymers for flocculation results in an average of 80% of microplastic removal from water.

Polyacrylamide has also been found to be an effective flocculant for removing microplastics from water.

Biofilters, such as biochar filtration, have been used in wastewater treatment plants. The biochar acts as an adsorbent and is capable of removing up to 97% of microplastics from effluent.

Bacteria, such as Pseudomonas aeruginosa, have been employed to trap microplastics in biofilms. Moreover, bacteria can simultaneously bind to and capture microplastics, while bioremediating the heavy metals adsorbed to the microplastics.

Efforts to physically remove microplastics from the Great Pacific Garbage Patch have used nets and collection bags. The method of netting or bagging plastics in the ocean involves pairs of ships pulling large bags or nets, like plankton nets, to remove the plastics.

== Remediation of Microplastics in Soil and Sediments ==
Microplastics are commonly found in soil and sediments. Techniques are under development to achieve reductions in soil microplastics via photodegradation, chemical extraction, or bioremediation. Additionally, density separation has been found to be an effective technique for microplastic remediation of sediments.

Density separation involves saturating a volume of water with salts, such as NaCl or ZnCl, and dissolving the sediments. The microplastics are less dense than the saturated water which causes them to float to the top and can be removed by decantation.

Biodegradation of microplastics has been accomplished in soils and sediments by utilizing microorganisms, such as bacteria or fungi, that are capable of eating the plastics as a food source. The soils and sediments are placed in a bioreactor with the chosen microorganism which allows for the breakdown of the plastics.

Microplastics in soils and sediments impact soil structure and properties, leading to long term environmental consequences regarding erosion and agriculture. Long-term soil exposure to microplastics can reduce soil health and affect crop yield.

== See also ==
- Environmental remediation
- Microplastics and human health
- Plastic pollution
