= Administrative control =

Class of occupational hazard control

Hierarchy of controls

Administrative controls are modifications or changes to work practices or behaviors in order to reduce the severity of impact from hazards or hazardous operations. This category of control relies more on worker compliance (e.g., factory floor workers) and often does not offer permanent solutions to control hazards in workplaces.

This electrical hazard safety sign used in Germany is an example of an administrative control.

In the hierarchy of hazard controls, administrative controls lies 4th below engineering controls and above personal protective equipment in terms of the effectiveness and efficiency of hazard controls ranking. They should be used after elimination, substitution and engineering controls have already been implemented / considered or as an extra layer of protection from hazards. Some agencies add isolation as a step to their hierarchy of controls, with that level also needing consideration prior to administrative controls. The reasoning for lower effectiveness is that success in reducing hazards relies on individuals following rules, procedures, and/or training, all of which are still susceptible to human error, while levels above it reduce the impact of human error.

Administrative controls are more effective than PPE because they involve some manner of prior planning and avoidance, whereas PPE serves only as a final barrier between the hazard and worker. Administrative controls are second lowest because they require workers or employers to actively think or comply with regulations and do not offer permanent solutions to problems. Generally, administrative controls are cheaper to begin, but they may become more expensive over time as higher failure rates and the need for constant training or re-certification outweigh the initial investments of the three more desirable hazard controls in the hierarchy. The U.S. National Institute for Occupational Safety and Health recommends administrative controls when hazards cannot be removed or changed, and engineering controls are not practical.

Some key features of Administrative Controls include:

- Safety Policy
- Safe work practices
- Training
- Scheduling (Including maintenance)
- Working alone protocol (lone worker policy)
- Emergency Management / Preparedness
- Safety Signages & Documentation
- Preventive health measures (Health checkup, Monitoring etc.)
- Housekeeping

Some common examples of administrative controls include work practice controls such as prohibiting mouth pipetting and rotating worker shifts in coal mines to prevent hearing loss. Other examples include hours of service regulations for commercial vehicle operators, safety signage for hazards, regular maintenance of equipment, and incorporating stretching and short breaks to reduce ergonomic stressors.

== COVID-19 ==
Administrative controls are used to limit the spread of COVID-19 by changing human habits and social organization. These include policies such as remote work, restriction on indoor gatherings, staggered schedules, enforcing masks in areas and mandating vaccination while reducing close contact and crowding. The effectiveness of these actions are highly dependent on human behavior, making them less reliable on their own, but when combined with engineering controls such as hard barricades for maintaining distance or limiting the entry by controlling doors, then they can be highly effective.

== History ==
The origin of administrative controls goes to the ancient governance systems where rulers used written rules and organized bureaucracies to maintain order and efficiency. Early examples can be found from Mesopotamia, China, and Egypt where officials managed labor, justice, and even the work schedules to reduce stress.

Administrative control methods were also used during the industrial revolution as a way to reduce growing injuries by setting up rules, supervision, and procedures. By the 20th century, administrative measures like work scheduling, training, and enforcing exposure limits became common for managing risk. The formation of OSHA and NIOSH in 1970 marked a major step in formalizing such controls in the US workforce over time, evolving to focus on systematic risk management, accountability and continuous improvement.
