= Sticky mat =

Object used to increase the cleanliness of an area

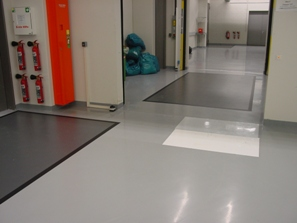
A sticky mat in a lens manufacturing facility

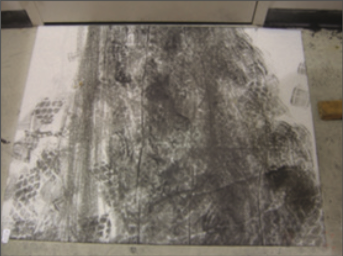
A sticky mat in a nanomaterials production facility. Ideally, other engineering controls should lessen the amount of dust collecting on the floor and being tracked onto the sticky mat, unlike this example.

A sticky mat, also called a tacky mat or cleanroom mat, is a mat with an adhesive surface that is placed at the entrances or exits to certain workplaces to remove contaminants from the bottoms of footwear and wheeled carts such as hand trucks. They are an example of an engineering control within the hierarchy of hazard controls.

== Overview ==
Sticky mats are typically used in cleanrooms and construction sites. Their purpose is to prevent contaminants from entering the site with personnel, and hazardous materials from exiting. In a cleanroom setting, airborne particles that are not removed by the ventilation system deposit themselves onto a surface, where they can be transported by personnel walking on or past them.

Sticky mats can be temporary or permanent. Temporary sticky mats are made of a stack of adhesive plastic film layers that are periodically peeled off and discarded. Permanent mats are made of a polymer, usually polyester- or polyvinyl chloride-based, that binds particles through electrostatic forces. The peeling process for temporary mats may dislodge particles from the mat, causing inhalation risk. However, permanent mats must be washed with a mop and detergent, which is more time-consuming and may be done less often.

== Research ==
A 2012 study found that temporary adhesive mats reduced the particle level on shoes and overshoes by 20–50% while permanent polymeric flooring reduced it by approximately 80%, and that adhesive mats released more particles when they were dirtier and when they were peeled quickly. However, sticky mats placed outside the entrance to an operating room or suite have not been shown to reduce the number of organisms on shoes or stretcher wheels, nor do they reduce the risk of surgical site infections.
