= Vented balance safety enclosure =

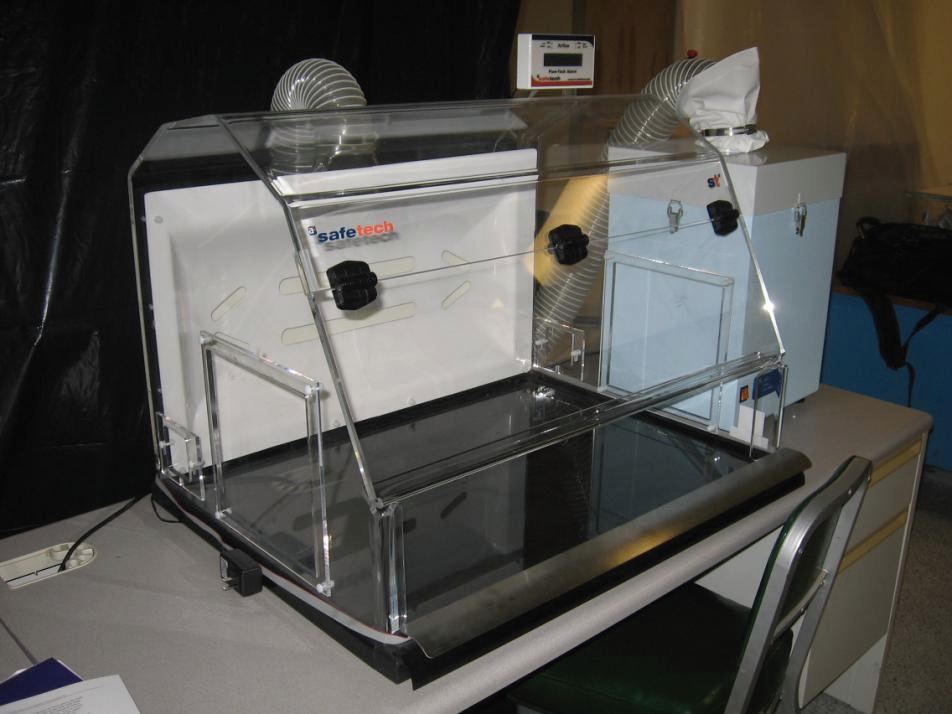
A ventilated balance enclosure

Vented balance safety enclosures are used in pharmaceutical, chemical, biological, and toxicological laboratories to provide maximum containment during weighing and other powder-handling operations.

Whereas fume hoods are designed to contain fumes and vapors, vented balance safety enclosures are designed to contain fine particulates. The lower airflow rates of the latter prevent air disturbances from affecting precise weight measurements.
