= Dustiness =

Propensity of a material to form an aerosol

Dustiness may be defined as the propensity of a finely divided solid to form an airborne dust (aerosol) from a mechanical or aerodynamic stimulus. Dustiness can be influenced by particle morphology (shape), size, and inter-particle forces. Dustiness increases the risk of inhalation exposure.

Dusty materials tend to generate aerosols with high particle concentrations measured in number or in mass. The tendency of powdered materials to release airborne particles under external energies indicates their dustiness level.

The dusty level of powders directly affects worker exposure scenarios and associated health risks in occupational settings. Powder-based aerosol particles can pose adverse effects when deposited in human respiratory systems via inhalation.

== Motivation ==
A significant motivation for quantifying and measuring the dustiness of materials comes from the area of workplace health and safety. The potential health impacts of suspended particles, particularly by inhalation, can be significant.

== Dustiness testing ==
The amount of dust produced during handling or processing of a powder can be affected by the nature of the handling process, the ambient humidity, the particle size and water content of the powder, and other factors. To measure dustiness of a particular powder in a replicable way, standardized testing procedures have been created and published.

=== European Committee for Standardization - Continuous Drop and Rotating Drum ===
Various laboratory systems have been developed to test dustiness of fine powders. A European standard on dustiness testing has been established by the European Committee for Standardization since April 2006. This standard is especially related to human exposure in workplace (EN 15051). It describes two methods: the rotating drum system and continuous drop system, both of which use gravity to stimulate the material and generate aerosols. The rotating drum method involves placing the powder in a cylinder containing baffles, while the continuous drop system involves allowing a stream of powder to fall onto a surface. While the drum approach has been successfully scaled down by some researchers, published standards call for tens or hundreds of grams of material, a stipulation that can prove problematic for nanomaterials, pharmaceuticals and other expensive powders.

== Nanomaterials dustiness ==
The dustiness of the nanomaterials can influence potential exposures and the selection of the appropriate engineering control during the manufacturing production. Electrostatic forces influence the stability of particle dispersion in air and effect the dustiness. Nanomaterials in dry powder form tend to pose the greatest risk for inhalation exposure, while nanomaterials suspended in a liquid typically present less risk via inhalation.

=== Safety measures ===
The full life cycle of a nanomaterial should be considered when planning to control for dust exposure. Nanomaterial synthesis reactors, nanoparticle collection and handling, product fabrication with nanomaterials, product use, and product disposal are potential sources of dust exposure.

National Institute for Occupational Safety and Health recommends the use of high-efficiency particulate air (HEPA) filters on local exhaust ventilation, laboratory chemical hoods, low-flow enclosures, and any other containment enclosures as a best practice during the handling of engineered nanomaterials.
