= Hazard elimination =

Hazard control by removing the hazard

Hazard elimination is a hazard control strategy based on completely removing a material or process causing a hazard. Elimination is the most effective of the five members of the hierarchy of hazard controls in protecting workers, and where possible should be implemented before all other control methods. Many jurisdictions require that an employer eliminate hazards if it is possible, before considering other types of hazard control.

Elimination is most effective early in the design process, when it may be inexpensive and simple to implement. It is more difficult to implement for an existing process, when major changes in equipment and procedures may be required. Elimination can fail as a strategy if the hazardous process or material is reintroduced at a later stage in the design or production phases.

The complete elimination of hazards is a major component to the philosophy of Prevention through Design, which promotes the practice of eliminating hazards at the earliest design stages of a project. Complete elimination of a hazard is often the most difficult control to achieve, but addressing it at the start of a project allows designers and planners to make large changes much more easily without the need to retrofit or redo work.

Understanding the 5 main hazard areas is a major part of assessing risks on a jobsite. The 5 main hazard areas are materials, environmental hazards, equipment hazards, people hazards, and system hazards. Materials can bring the hazards of inhalation, absorption, and ingestion. Equipment hazards are related taking the proper precautions to machinery and tools. People can create hazards by becoming distracted, taking shortcuts, using machinery when impaired, and general fatigue. System hazards is the practice of making sure employees are properly trained for their job, and ensuring that proper safety precautions are set in place.

== Typical examples ==
Removing the use of a hazardous chemical is an example of elimination. Some substances are difficult or impossible to eliminate because they have unique properties necessary to the process, but it may be possible to instead substitute less hazardous versions of the substance. Elimination also applies to equipment as well. For example, noisy equipment can be removed from a room used for other purposes, or an unnecessary blade can be removed from a machine. Prompt repair of damaged equipment eliminates hazards stemming from their malfunction.

Elimination also applies to processes. For example, the risk of falls can be eliminated by eliminating the process of working in a high area, by using extending tools from the ground instead of climbing, or moving a piece to be worked on to ground level. The need for workers to enter a hazardous area such as a grain elevator can be eliminated by installing equipment that performs the task automatically. Eliminating an inspection that requires opening a package containing a hazardous material reduces the inhalation hazard to the inspector.

== Complications of hazard elimination ==
Understanding the risks of a workplace environment is one of the most important ways to remain safe on a worksite and hazard elimination is the safest way to avoid serious injuries or fatalities. Assessing the risks of a workplace environment should be done at the design or development stage of the project because taking an entire risk out of a project can change its whole trajectory.

For example, removing hazardous materials before any work happens in a workplace environment is the ideal case because the hazard is completely removed from the situation before anyone has to do work around it. Working backwards to fix the problem after work has begun can create challenges such as construction starting on a site without realizing that hazardous material needs to removed causing a costly repair to go back and fix the problem.

Deciding whether hazard elimination is the right solution for a project may require weighing multiple factors. Some examples include whether the elimination of the hazard is appropriate for the severity of the hazard as well as whether the approach is effective, reliable, and will last. Determining if the elimination of the hazard will be done in a timely and economically beneficial manner is one of the most important parts of the decision because that is the motivation behind many projects.

Eliminating hazards around highways is a major issue due to the level of traffic. The Highway Safety Programs and Projects makes addresses major traffic concerns and takes a special priority for the safety of everyone on the road. Removing potential safety issues and addressing safety concerns is a costly project. The average price of hazard elimination is around $400,000 to $1,000,000.
