= Plastic pollution =

Accumulation of plastic in natural ecosystems

Plastic pollution
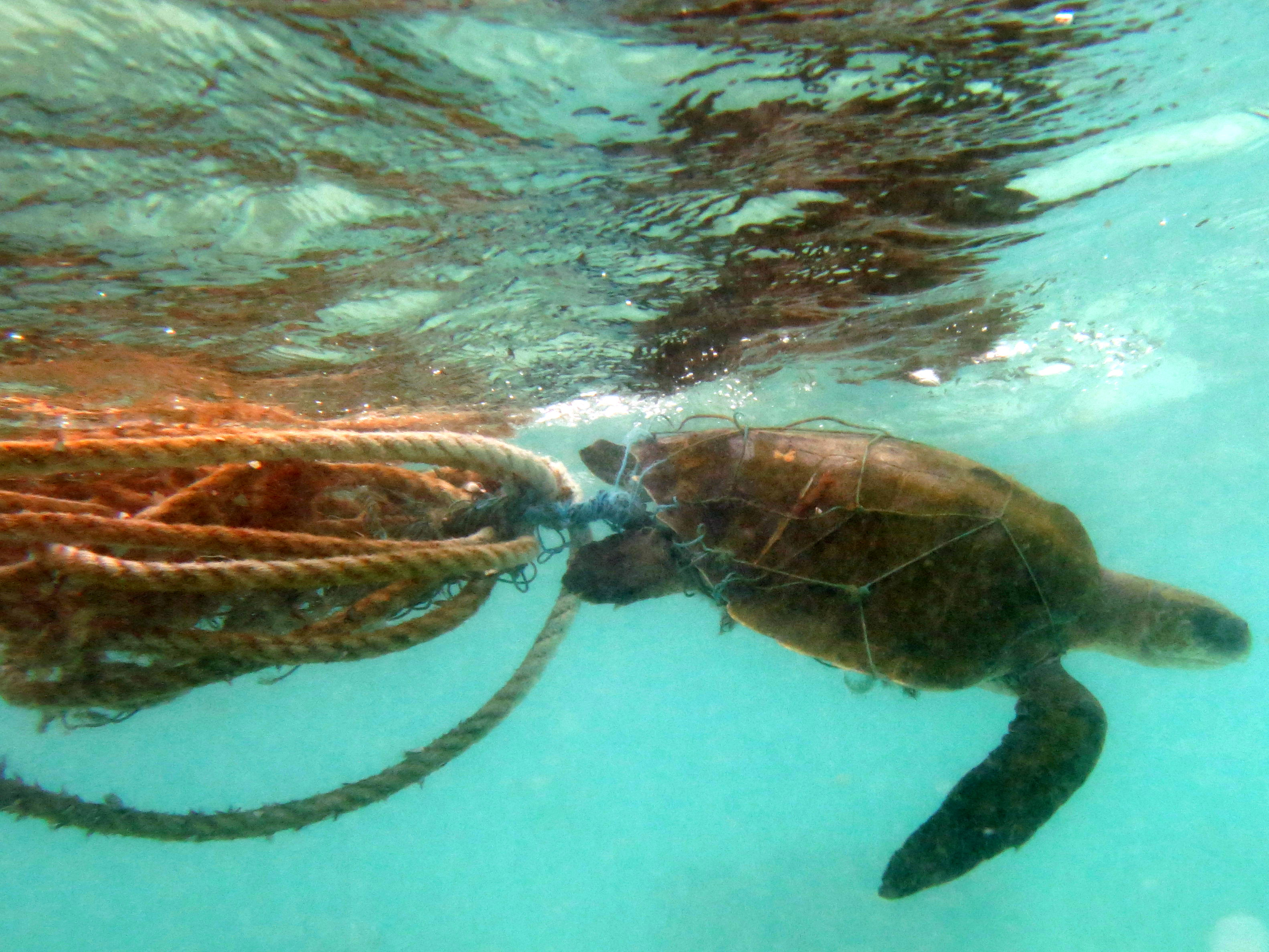
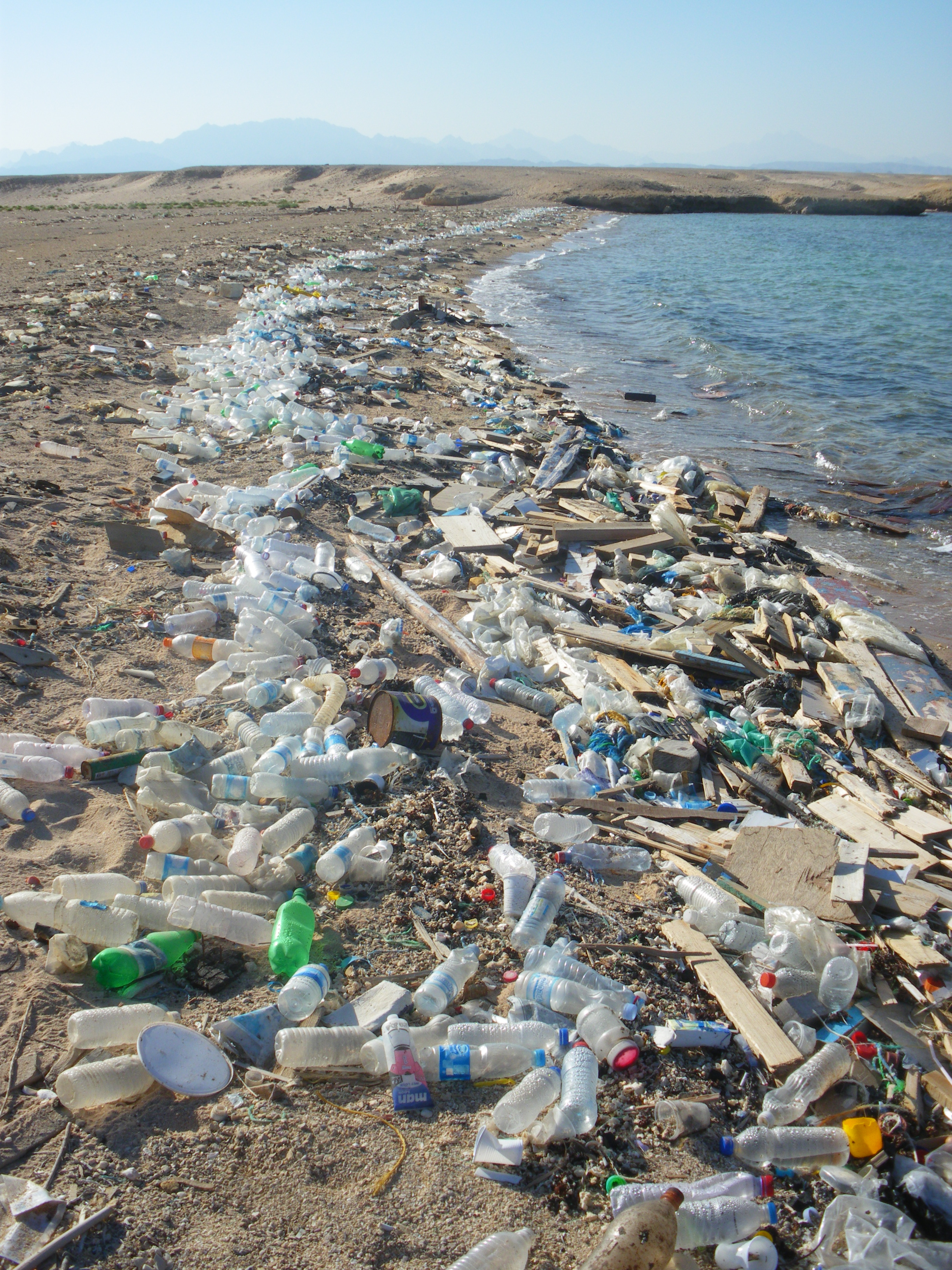
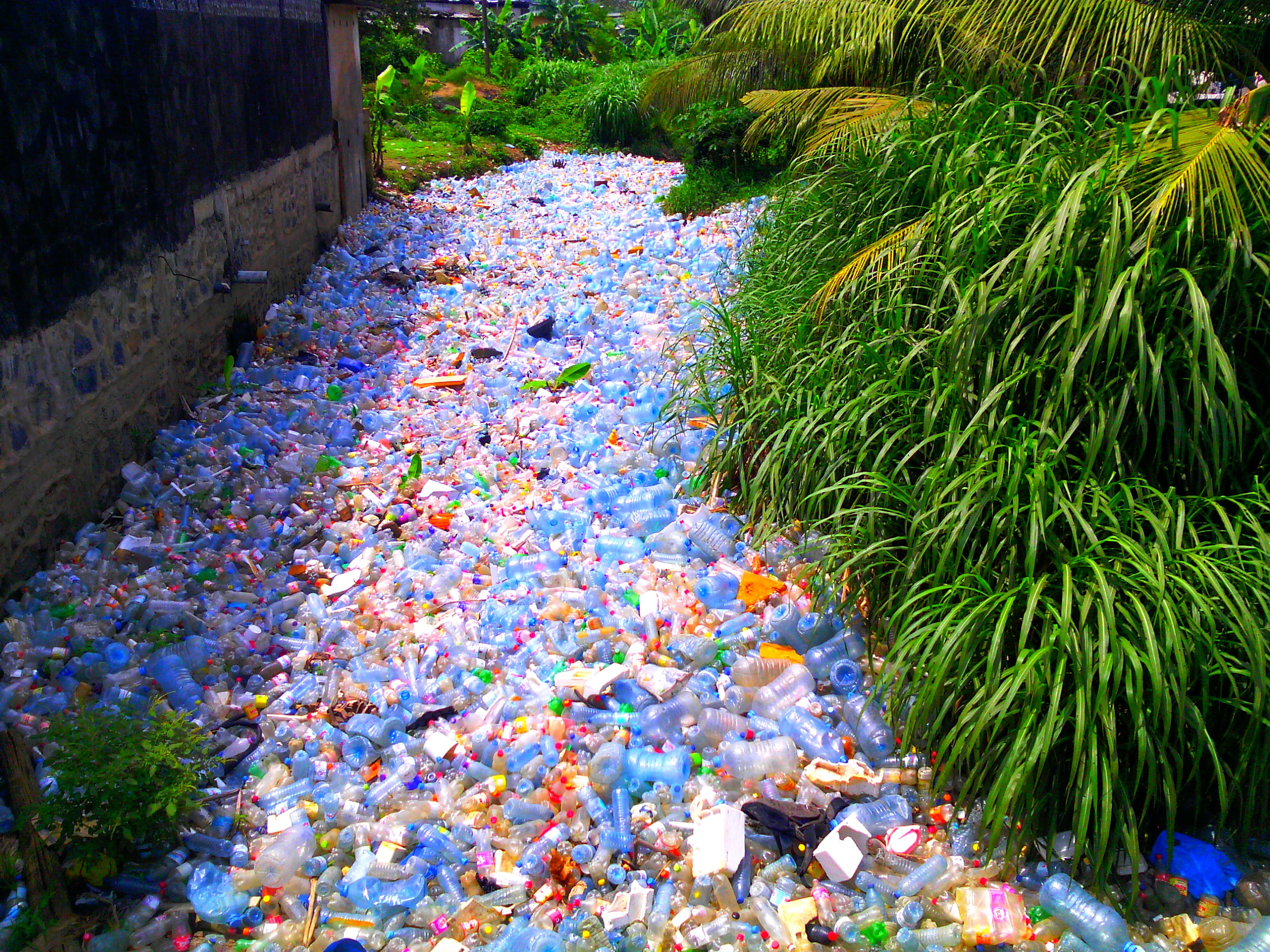
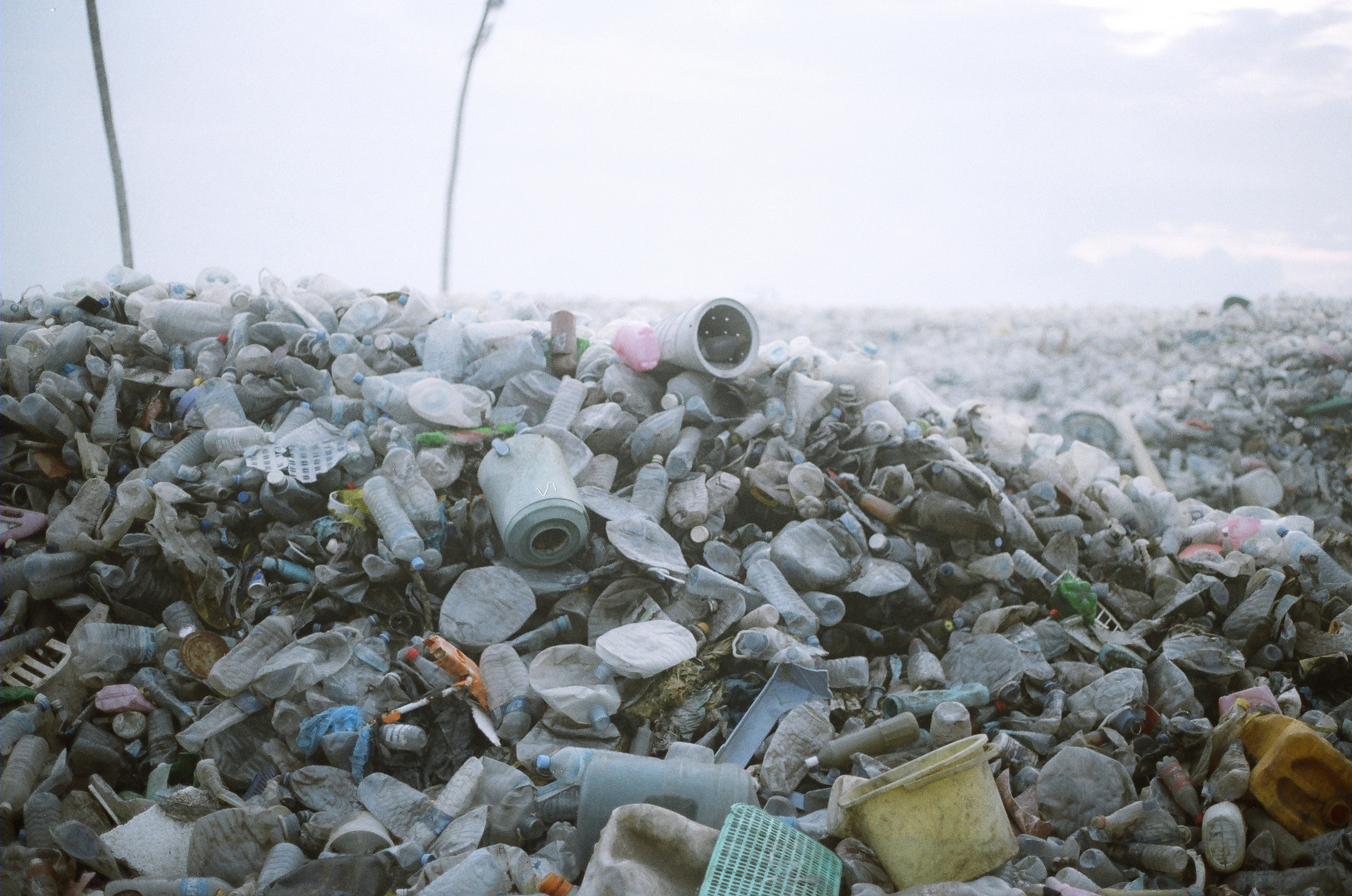
Plastic pollution affects seas, beaches, rivers and land (clockwise from top left):
- Olive ridley sea turtle entangled in a ghost net in the Maldives
- Plastic pollution of Sharm el-Naga beach, near Safaga, Egypt
- Piles of plastic waste on the government-authorized "garbage island" of Thilafushi, Maldives
- A tributary of the Wouri River in Douala, Cameroon, completely clogged with plastic.

Plastic pollution is the accumulation of plastic objects and particles (e.g. plastic bottles, bags and microbeads) in the Earth's environment that adversely affects humans, wildlife and their habitat. Plastics that act as pollutants are categorized by size into micro-, meso-, or macro debris. Plastics are inexpensive and durable, making them very adaptable for different uses; as a result, manufacturers choose to use plastic over other materials. However, the chemical structure of most plastics renders them resistant to many natural processes of degradation and as a result they are slow to degrade. Together, these two factors allow large volumes of plastic to enter the environment as mismanaged waste which persists in the ecosystem and travels throughout food webs.

== Timeline of problem ==
Share of plastic waste imports a country accounts for

Share of plastic waste exports a country accounts for

2022

In 2022, the worldwide entry of plastic into the ocean was 8 million metric tons of plastic per year. A 2021 study by The Ocean Cleanup estimated that rivers convey between 0.8 and 2.7 million metric tons of plastic into the ocean, and ranked these river's countries. The top ten were, from the most to the least: Philippines, India, Malaysia, China, Indonesia, Myanmar, Brazil, Vietnam, Bangladesh, and Thailand.

2020

As of 2020, the global mass of produced plastic exceeds the biomass of all land and marine animals combined. Borrelle et al. 2020 has estimated that 19–23 million tonnes of plastic waste entered aquatic ecosystems in 2016. while the Pew Charitable Trusts and SYSTEMIQ (2020) have estimated that 9–14 million tonnes of plastic waste ended up in the oceans the same year.

COVID era

The amount of plastic waste produced increased during the COVID-19 pandemic due to increased demand for protective equipment and packaging materials. Higher amounts of plastic ended up in the ocean, especially plastic from medical waste and masks. Several news reports point to a plastic industry trying to take advantage of the health concerns and desire for disposable masks and packaging to increase production of single use plastic.

2019

As of 2019, 368 million tonnes of plastic is produced each year; 51% in Asia, where China is the world's largest producer. From the 1950s up to 2018, an estimated 6.3 billion tonnes of plastic has been produced worldwide, of which an estimated 9% has been recycled and another 12% has been incinerated. This large amount of plastic waste enters the environment and causes problems throughout the ecosystem; for example, studies suggest that the bodies of 90% of seabirds contain plastic debris. In some areas there have been significant efforts to reduce the prominence of free range plastic pollution, through reducing plastic consumption, litter cleanup, and promoting plastic recycling.

2015

As of 2015, an estimated 1.1 to 8.8 million tonnes of plastic waste enters the ocean from coastal communities each year. It is estimated that there is a stock of 86 million tons of plastic marine debris in the worldwide ocean as of the end of 2013, with an assumption that 1.4% of global plastics produced from 1950 to 2013 has entered the ocean and has accumulated there. Global plastic production has surged from 1.5 million tons in the 1950s to 335 million tons in 2016, resulting in environmental concerns. A significant issue arises from the inefficient treatment of 79% of plastic products, leading to their release into landfills or natural environments.

2007

As of 2007, one billion tons of plastic waste was estimated to be produced since 1950s. Others estimate a cumulative human production of 8.3 billion tons of plastic, of which 6.3 billion tons is waste, with only 9% getting recycled. It is estimated that this waste is made up of 81% polymer resin, 13% polymer fibres and 32% polymer additives. In 2018 more than 343 million tonnes of plastic waste were generated, 90% of which was composed of post-consumer plastic waste (industrial, agricultural, commercial and municipal plastic waste). The rest was pre-consumer waste from resin production and manufacturing of plastic products (e.g. materials rejected due to unsuitable colour, hardness, or processing characteristics).

Projections

Despite global efforts to reduce the generation of plastic waste, losses to the environment are predicted to increase. Modelling indicates that, without major interventions, between 23 and 37 million tonnes per year of plastic waste could enter the oceans by 2040 and between 155 and 265 million tonnes per year could be discharged into the environment by 2060. Under a business as usual scenario, such increases would likely be attributable to a continuing rise in production of plastic products, driven by consumer demand, accompanied by insufficient improvements in waste management. As the plastic waste released into the environment already has a significant impact on ecosystems, an increase of this magnitude could have dramatic consequences. Some researchers suggest that by 2050 there could be more plastic than fish in the oceans by weight. A report by the OECD projects that the amount of plastic waste produced by 2060 will reach more than 900 million tons, approximately three times the amount compared to 2019. The same projection estimated that packaging waste will remain the principal fraction of the waste stream, and that landfilling will remain the main method to dispose of plastic waste.

== Causes ==
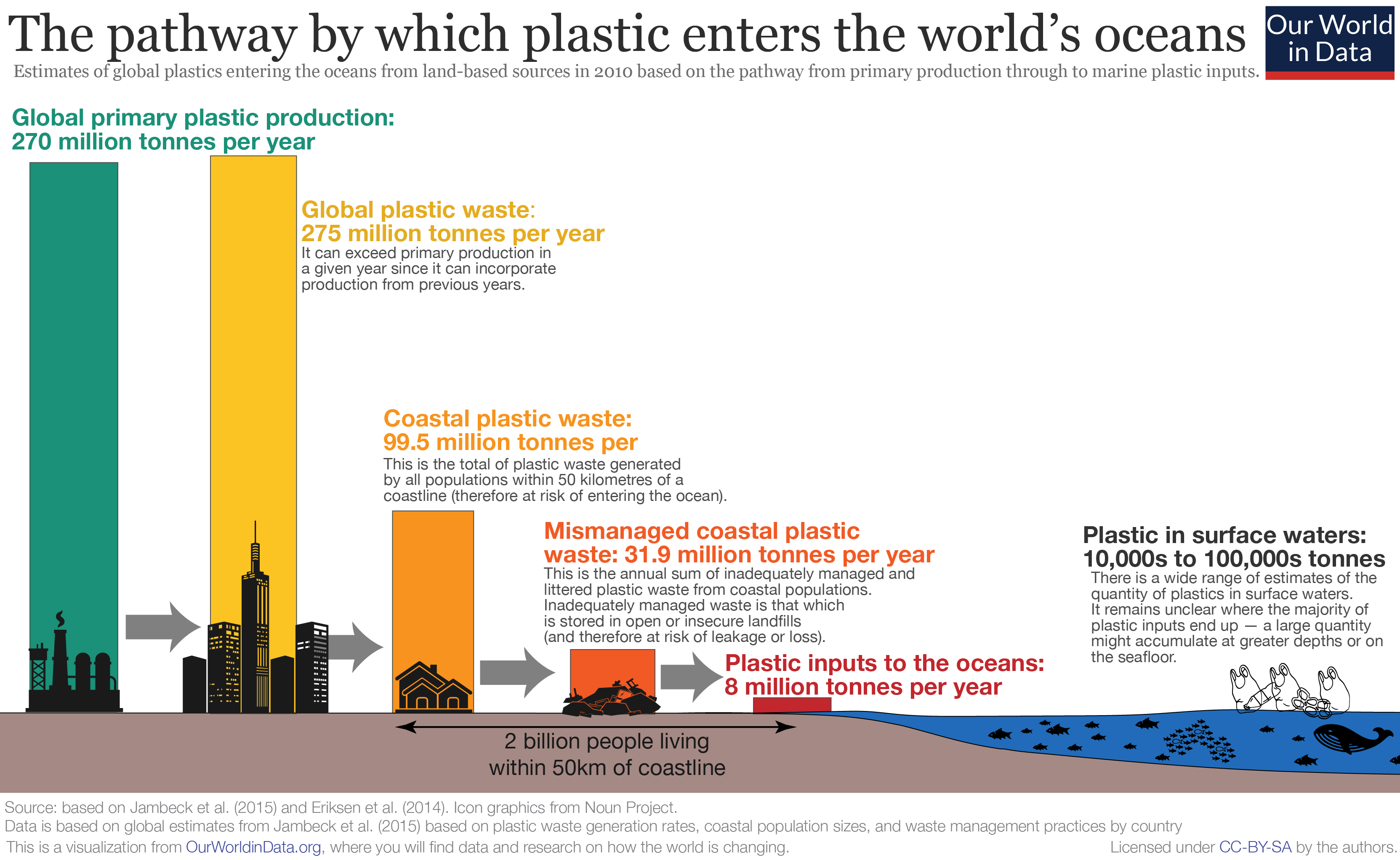
The pathway by which plastics enters the world's oceans

Sources of plastic pollution is related to uses. Uses of plastics as of 2024 are plastic packaging (219 Mt), construction (132 Mt), textile (119 Mt), domestic/leisure (96 Mt), other (182 Mt). Several studies have attempted to quantify plastic leakage into the environment at both national and global levels which have highlight the difficulty of determining the sources and amounts of all plastic leakage. One global study has estimated that between 60 and 99 million tonnes of mismanaged plastic waste were produced in 2015.

In the United States plastic packaging has been estimated to make up 5% of MSW. This packaging includes plastic bottles, pots, tubs and trays, plastic films shopping bags, rubbish bags, bubble wrap, and plastic or stretch wrap and plastic foams e.g. expanded polystyrene (EPS). Plastic waste is generated in sectors including agriculture (e.g. irrigation pipes, greenhouse covers, fencing, pellets, plastic mulch; construction (e.g. pipes, paints, flooring and roofing, insulants and sealants); transport (e.g. abraded tyres, road surfaces and road markings); electronic and electric equipment (e-waste); and pharmaceuticals and healthcare. The total amounts of plastic waste generated by these sectors is uncertain.

The trade in plastic waste has been identified as "a main culprit" of marine litter. (Note: "Campaigners have identified the global trade in plastic waste as a main culprit in marine litter, because the industrialised world has for years been shipping much of its plastic "recyclables" to developing countries, which often lack the capacity to process all the material.") Countries importing the waste plastics often lack the capacity to process all the material. As a result, the United Nations has imposed a ban on waste plastic trade unless it meets certain criteria. (Note: "The new UN rules will effectively prevent the US and EU from exporting any mixed plastic waste, as well plastics that are contaminated or unrecyclable – a move that will slash the global plastic waste trade when it comes into effect in January 2021.")

== Types of plastic debris ==
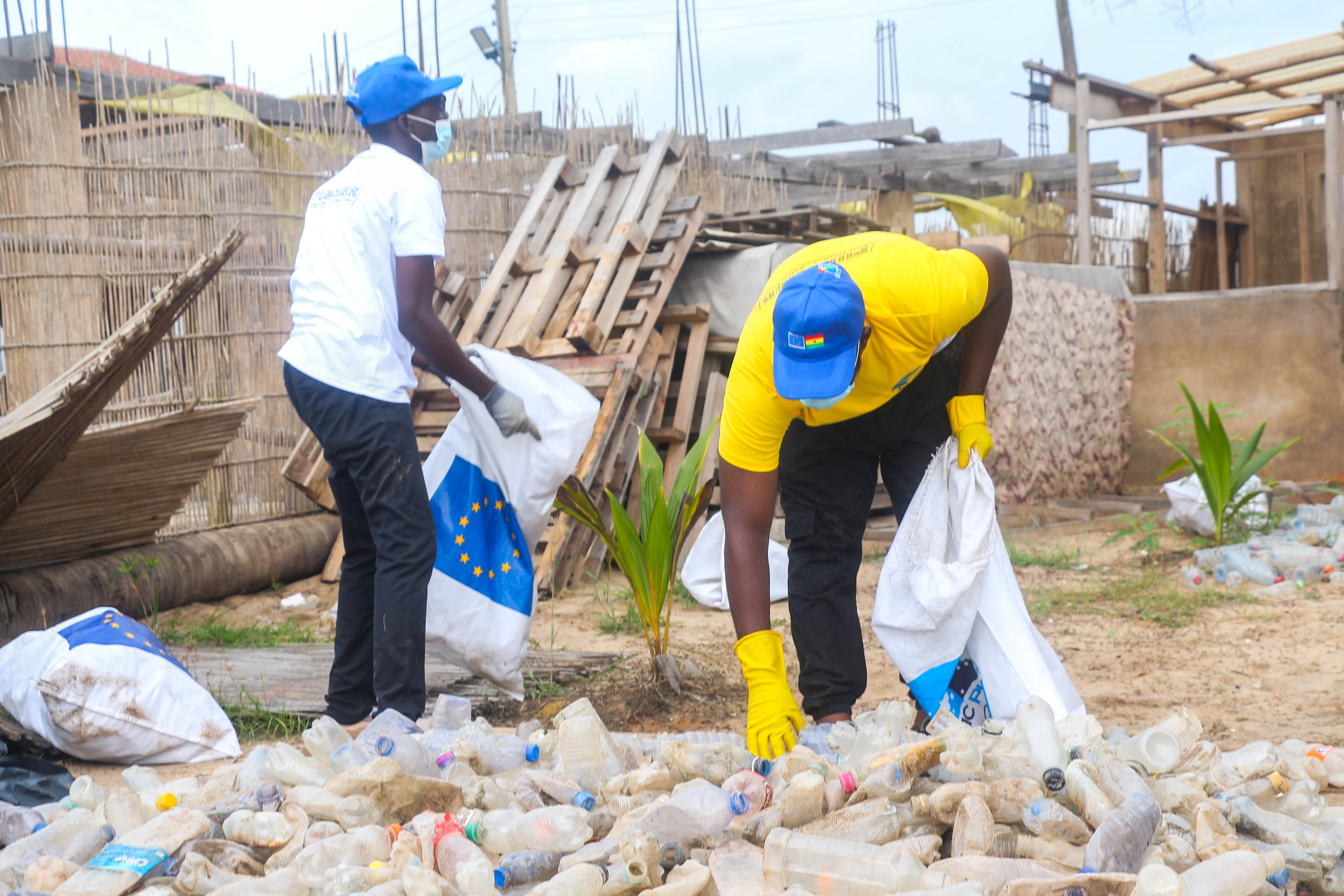
Beach cleanup in Ghana

Many forms of plastic contribute to plastic pollution, ranging from macroscopic articles to microplastic. These may also be referred to as micro-, meso-, and macro debris.

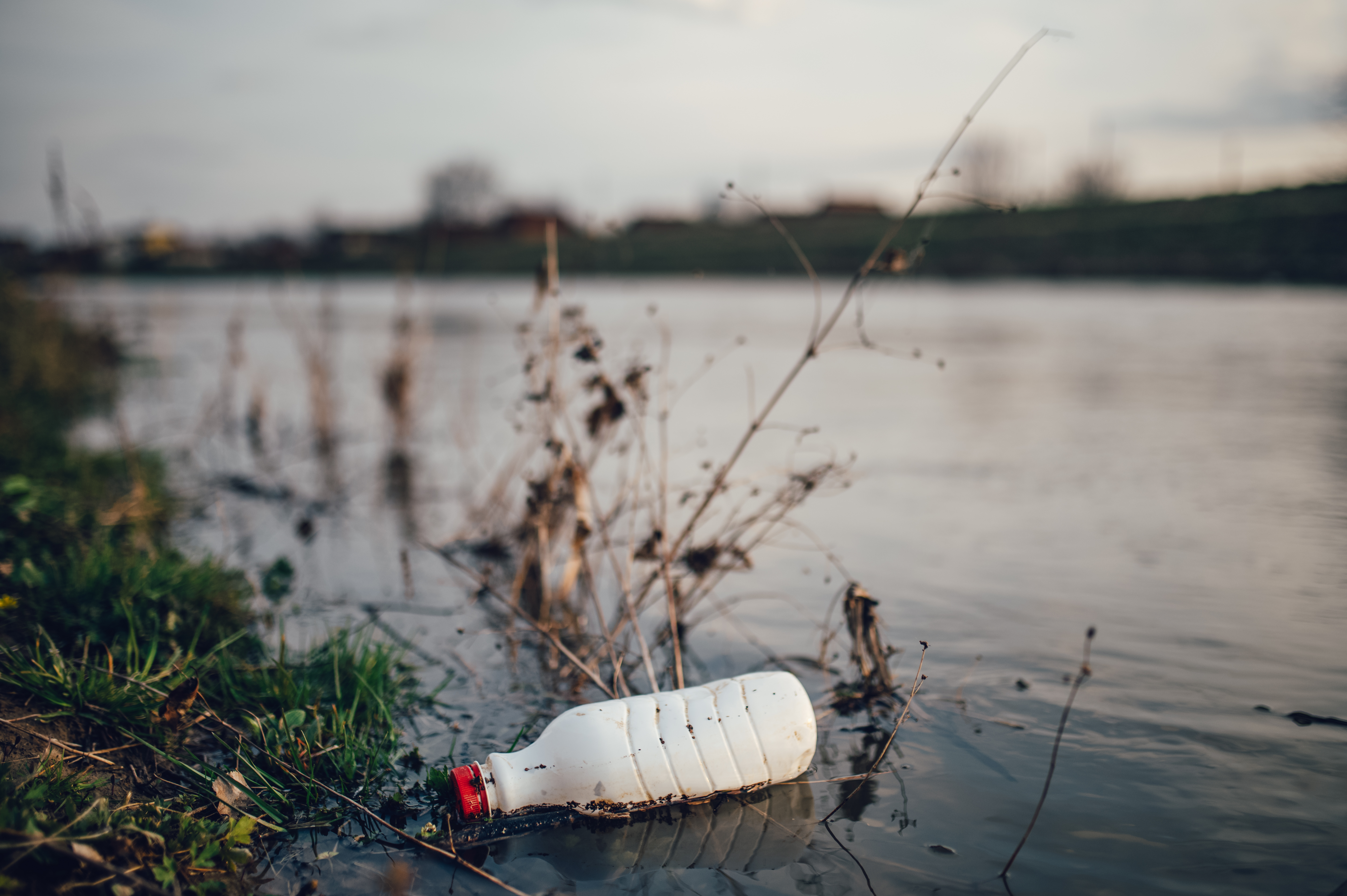
Plastic bottle stuck on edge of river

Plastic can be found off the coast of some islands because of currents carrying the debris. Both mega- and macro-plastics are found in packaging, footwear, and other domestic items that have been washed off of ships or discarded in landfills. Fishing-related items are more likely to be found around remote islands. Plastic debris is categorized as either primary or secondary. Primary plastics are in their original form when collected. Examples of these would be bottle caps, cigarette butts, and microbeads. Secondary plastics, on the other hand, account for smaller plastics that have resulted from the degradation of primary plastics.

Microplastics in the surface ocean 1950–2000 and projections beyond, in million metric tonnes

=== Microdebris ===
Microdebris are plastic pieces between 2 mm and 5 mm in size. Plastic debris that starts off as meso- or macrodebris can become microdebris through degradation and collisions that break it down into smaller pieces. Microdebris is more commonly referred to as nurdles. Nurdles are recycled to make new plastic items, but they easily end up released into the environment during production because of their small size. They often end up in ocean waters through rivers and streams. Microdebris that come from cleaning and cosmetic products are also referred to as scrubbers. Because microdebris and scrubbers are so small in size, filter-feeding organisms often consume them.

Nurdles enter the ocean by means of spills during transportation or from land based sources. The Ocean Conservancy reported that China, Indonesia, Philippines, Thailand, and Vietnam dump more plastic in the sea than all other countries combined. It is estimated that 10% of the plastics in the ocean are nurdles, making them one of the most common types of plastic pollution, along with plastic bags and food containers. These micro-plastics can accumulate in the oceans and allow for the accumulation of Persistent Bio-accumulating Toxins such as bisphenol A, polystyrene, DDT, and PCB's which are hydrophobic in nature and can cause adverse health affects.

A 2004 study by Richard Thompson from the University of Plymouth, UK, found a great amount of microdebris on beaches and in waters in Europe, the Americas, Australia, Africa, and Antarctica. Thompson and his associates found that plastic pellets from both domestic and industrial sources were being broken down into much smaller plastic pieces, some having a diameter smaller than human hair. If not ingested, this microdebris floats instead of being absorbed into the marine environment. Thompson predicts there may be 300,000 plastic items per square kilometre of sea surface and 100,000 plastic particles per square kilometre of seabed. International Pellet Watch collected samples of polythene pellets from 30 beaches in 17 countries which were analysed for organic micro-pollutants. It was found that pellets found on beaches in the US, Vietnam and southern Africa contained compounds from pesticides suggesting a high use of pesticides in the areas. A 2020 estimated that Earth's seafloor contains about 14 million tons of microplastic – about double the amount they estimated based on data from earlier studies – despite calling both estimates "conservative" as coastal areas are known to contain much more microplastic.

The distribution of plastic debris is highly variable as a result of certain factors such as wind and ocean currents, coastline geography, urban areas, and trade routes. Human population in certain areas also plays a large role in this. Plastics are more likely to be found in enclosed regions such as the Caribbean. It serves as a means of distribution of organisms to remote coasts that are not their native environments. This could potentially increase the variability and dispersal of organisms in specific areas that are less biologically diverse. Plastics can also be used as vectors for chemical contaminants such as persistent organic pollutants and heavy metals.

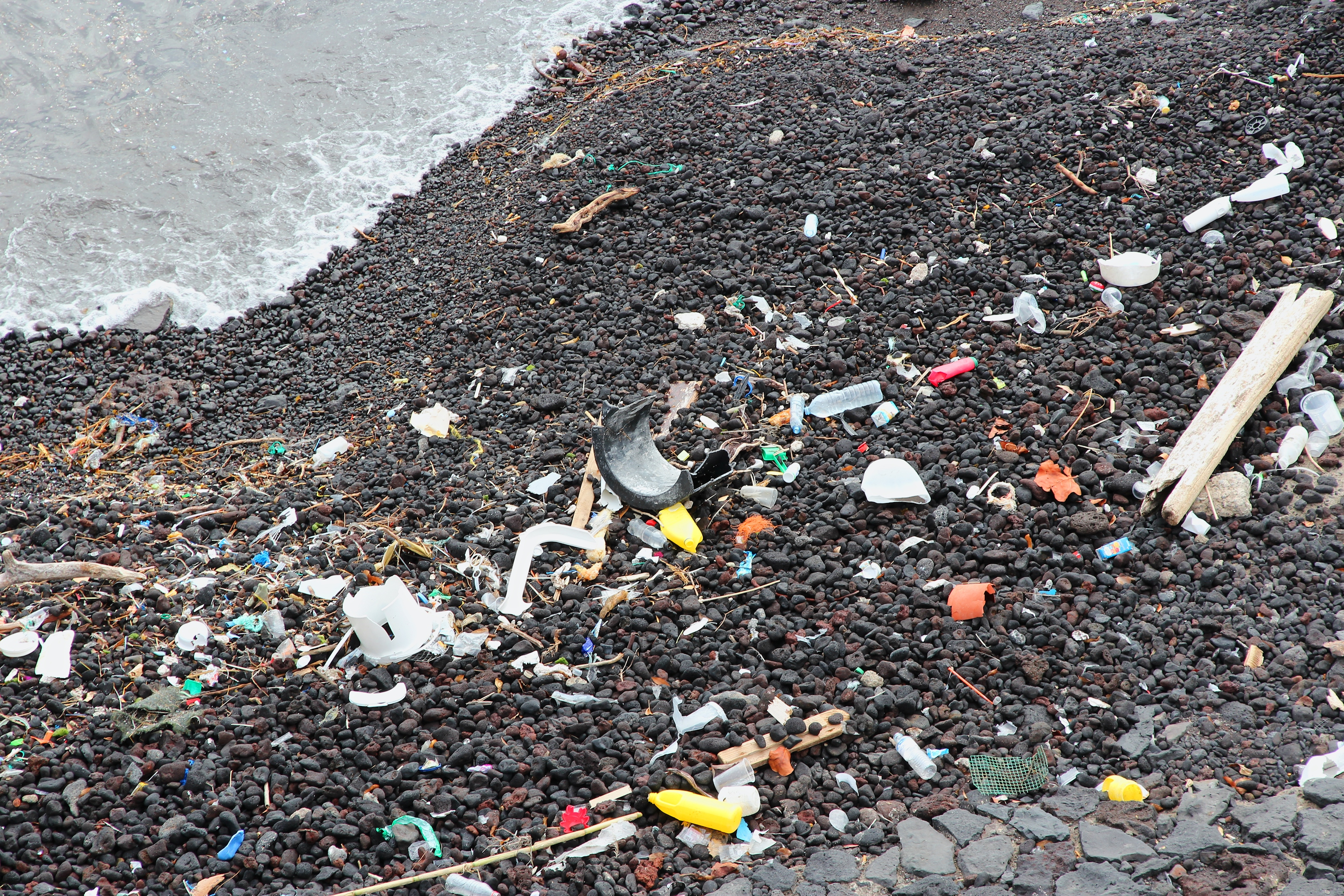
Atlantic Ocean marine plastic on a beach in Tenerife

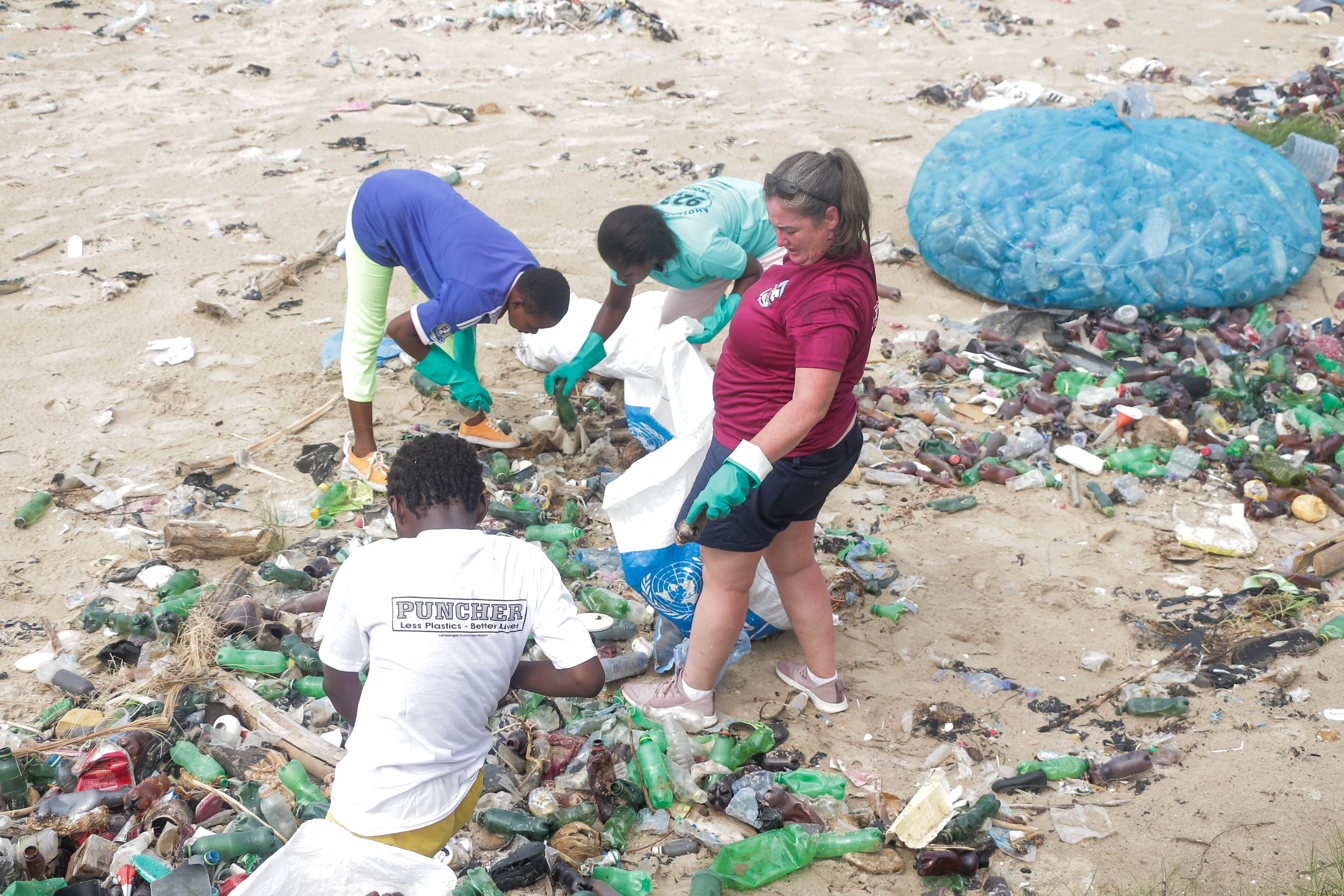
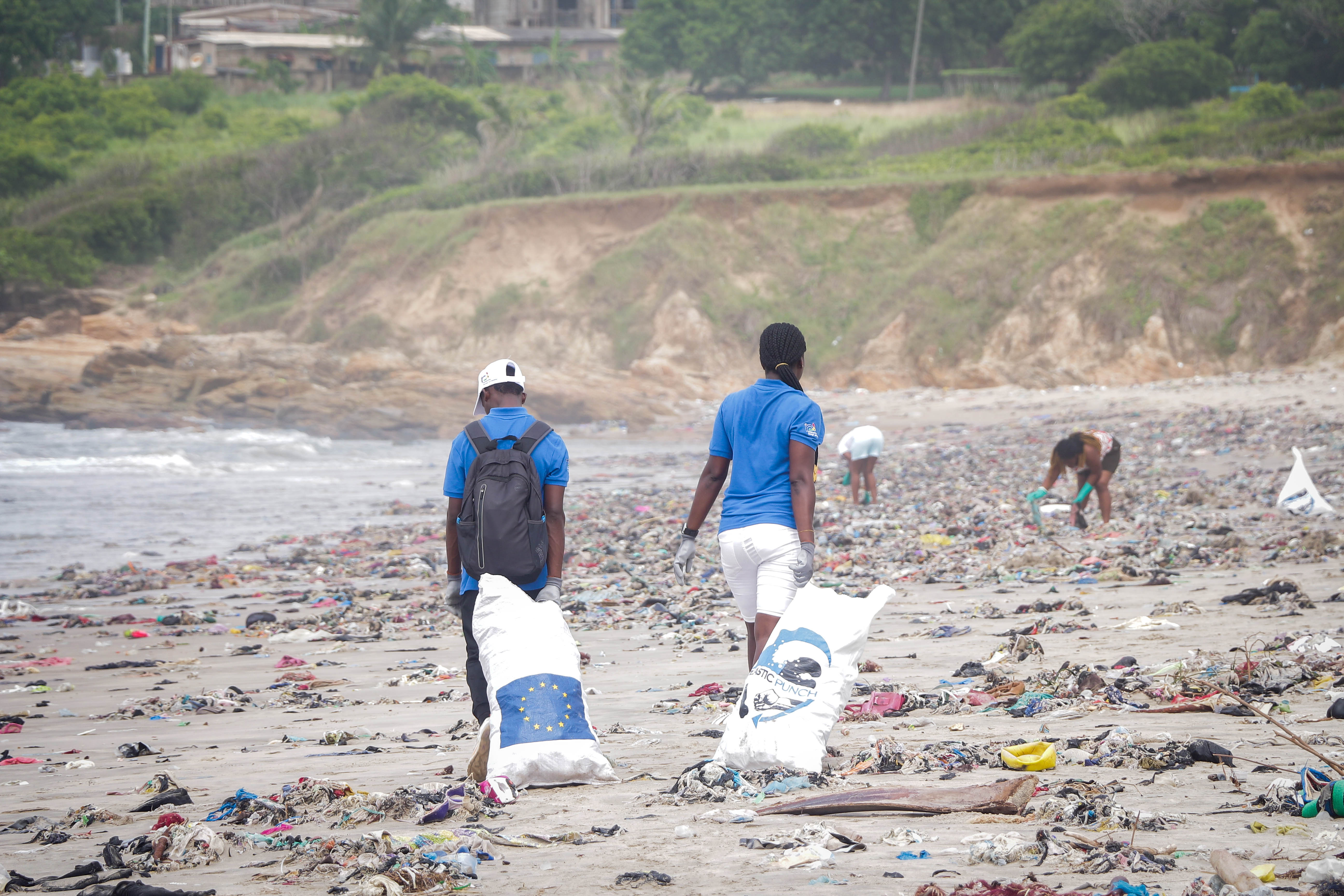
A man and woman dragging a bag of plastic waste collected from the beach in Ghana

=== Macrodebris ===
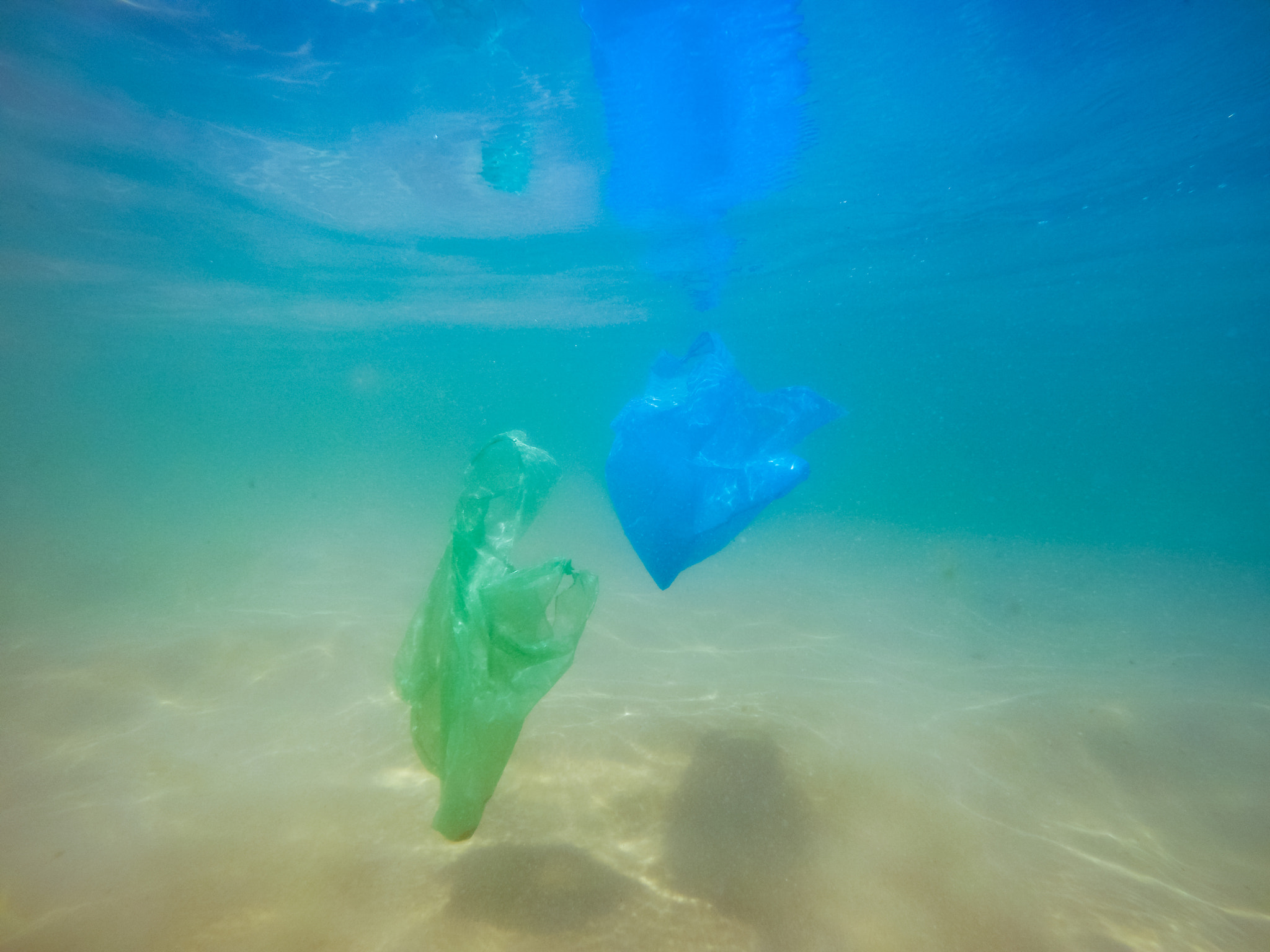
Plastic bags are an example of macrodebris.

Macroplastics at the surface ocean 1950–2000 and projections beyond, in million metric tonnes

Plastic debris is categorized as macrodebris when it is larger than 20 mm. These include items such as plastic grocery bags. Macrodebris are often found in ocean waters, and can have a serious impact on the native organisms. Fishing nets have been prime pollutants. Even after they have been abandoned, they continue to trap marine organisms and other plastic debris. Eventually, these abandoned nets become too difficult to remove from the water because they become too heavy, having grown in weight up to 6 tonnes.

== Major plastic waste generator and polluter countries ==
Share of plastic waste that is inadequately managed

Per capita mismanaged plastic waste (in kilograms per person per day)

=== Plastic waste generation ===
The United States is the world leader in generating plastic waste, producing an annual 42 million metric tons of plastic waste. Per capita generation of plastic waste in the United States is higher than in any other country, with the average American producing 130.09 kilograms of plastic waste per year. Other high-income countries, such as those of the EU-28 (annual per capita generation 58.56 kg), also have a high per capita plastic waste generation rate. Some high-income countries, such as Japan (annual per capital generation 38.44 kg), produce far less plastic waste per capita.

=== Mismanaged plastic waste polluters ===
Top 12 mismanaged plastic waste polluters
1. China (27.7%)
2. Indonesia (10.1%)
3. Philippines (5.90%)
4. Vietnam (5.80%)
5. Sri Lanka (5.00%)
6. Thailand (3.20%)
7. Egypt (3.00%)
8. Malaysia (2.90%)
9. Nigeria (2.70%)
10. Bangladesh (2.50%)
11. South Africa (2.00%)
12. India (1.90%)
13. Rest of the world (27.3%)

In 2018 approximately 513 million tonnes of plastics wind up in the oceans every year out of which the 83,1% is from the following 20 countries: China is the most mismanaged plastic waste polluter leaving in the sea the 27.7% of the world total, second Indonesia with the 10.1%, third Philippines with 5.9%, fourth Vietnam with 5.8%, fifth Sri Lanka 5.0%, sixth Thailand with 3.2%, seventh Egypt with 3.0%, eighth Malaysia with 2.9%, ninth Nigeria with 2.7%, tenth Bangladesh with 2.5%, eleventh South Africa with 2.0%, twelfth India with 1.9%, thirteenth Algeria with 1.6%, fourteenth Turkey with 1.5%, fifteenth Pakistan with 1.5%, sixteenth Brazil with 1.5%, seventeenth Myanmar with 1.4%, eighteenth Morocco with 1.0%, nineteenth North Korea with 1.0%, twentieth United States with 0.9%. The rest of world's countries combined wind up the 16.9% of the mismanaged plastic waste in the oceans, according to a study published by Science in 2015.

All the European Union countries combined would rank eighteenth on the list.

In 2020, a study revised the potential 2016 U.S. contribution to mismanaged plastic; It estimated that U.S.-generated plastic might place the U.S. behind Indonesia and India in oceanic pollution, or it might place the U.S. behind Indonesia, India, Thailand, China, Brazil, Philippines, Egypt, Japan, Russia, and Vietnam. In 2022, it was estimated all OECD countries (North America, Chile, Colombia, Europe, Israel, Japan, S. Korea) may contribute 5% of oceanic plastic pollution, with the rest of the world polluting 95%. Since 2016 China ceased importing plastics for recycling and since 2019 international treaties signed by 187 countries restricted the export of plastics for recycling.

A 2019 study calculated the mismanaged plastic waste, in millions of metric tonnes (Mt) per year:

- 52 Mt – Asia
- 17 Mt – Africa
- 7.9 Mt – Latin America & Caribbean
- 3.3 Mt – Europe
- 0.3 Mt – US & Canada
- 0.1 Mt – Oceania (Australia, New Zealand, etc.)

=== Total plastic waste polluters ===
Around 275 million tonnes of plastic waste is generated each year around the world; between 4.8 million and 12.7 million tonnes is dumped into the sea. About 60% of the plastic waste in the ocean comes from the top five countries: China, Indonesia, the Philippines, Thailand and Vietnam. The table below list the top 20 plastic waste polluting countries in 2010 according to a study published by Science, Jambeck et al (2015).

Top plastic polluters as of 2010
Position	Country	Plastic pollution (in 1000 tonnes per year)
1	China	8820
2	Indonesia	3220
3	Philippines	1880
4	Vietnam	1830
5	Sri Lanka	1590
6	Thailand	1030
7	Egypt	970
8	Malaysia	940
9	Nigeria	850
10	Bangladesh	790
11	South Africa	630
12	India	600
13	Algeria	520
14	Turkey	490
15	Pakistan	480
16	Brazil	470
17	Myanmar	460
18	Morocco	310
19	North Korea	300
20	United States	280

All the European Union countries combined would rank eighteenth on the list.

In a study published by Environmental Science & Technology, Schmidt et al (2017) calculated that ten rivers: two in Africa (the Nile and the Niger) and eight in Asia (the Ganges, Indus, Yellow, Yangtze, Hai He, Pearl, Mekong and Amur) "transport 88–95% of the global plastics load into the sea."

The Caribbean Islands are the biggest plastic polluters per capita in the world. Trinidad and Tobago produces 1.5 kilograms of waste per capita per day, is the biggest plastic polluter per capita in the world. At least 0.19 kg per person per day of Trinidad and Tobago's plastic debris end up in the ocean, or for example Saint Lucia which generates more than four times the amount of plastic waste per capita as China and is responsible for 1.2 times more improperly disposed plastic waste per capita than China. Of the top thirty global polluters per capita, ten are from the Caribbean region. These are Trinidad and Tobago, Antigua and Barbuda, Saint Kitts and Nevis, Guyana, Barbados, Saint Lucia, Bahamas, Grenada, Anguilla and Aruba, according to a set of studies summarized by Forbes (2019).

== Effects ==
=== Effects on the environment ===
Plastic pollution negatively affects our environment. "The pollution is significant and widespread, with plastic debris found on even the most remote coastal areas and in every marine habitat". Living organisms, particularly marine animals, can be harmed either by mechanical effects such as entanglement or ingestion of plastic waste, or through exposure to chemicals within plastics that interfere with their physiology.

The emissions of methane from plastic decomposition and impact on phytoplankton, were still not known well when the report was released. According to one estimate, plastic floating in the ocean can emit annually 76 Mt methane equal to 2,129 Mt CO2e, based on the 100 years global warming potential of methane. But these numbers are very preliminary. From one side, it can be an overestimate as it is based on the emissions of LDPE in powder form, the most emission intensive type of plastic in this case and in tropical water where intense radiation increases decomposition. But from the other side it can be an underestimate, as it is not including the decomposition of plastic on land which is probably more emission intensive, the effects on phytoplankton which can be significant, the emissions from submerged plastic. Therefore, the authors prefer to not include them in the official estimate, but to write them in the full report, as a base for further discussion noting the high importance of the problem.

The problem of ocean plastic debris is ubiquitous. It is estimated that 1.5–4% of global plastics production ends up in the oceans every year, mainly as a result of poor waste management infrastructure and practices combined with irresponsible attitudes to the use and disposal of plastics. The weathering of plastic debris causes its fragmentation into particles that even small marine invertebrates may ingest hence contaminating the food chain. Their small size renders them untraceable to their source and extremely difficult to remove from open ocean environments. In the marine environment, plastic pollution causes "Entanglement, toxicological effects via ingestion of plastics, suffocation, starvation, dispersal, and rafting of organisms, provision of new habitats, and introduction of invasive species are significant ecological effects with growing threats to biodiversity and trophic relationships. Degradation (changes in the ecosystem state) and modifications of marine systems are associated with loss of ecosystem services and values. Consequently, this emerging contaminant affects the socio-economic aspects through negative impacts on tourism, fishery, shipping, and human health".

The international community is divided on how to address the plastic issue. Proposals range from national pledges to mandatory production controls, with the latter being supported by entities like the European Union. However, the recycling solution is under scrutiny due to low success rates. As a result, there's a growing movement towards reducing plastic production and implementing bans on single-use plastics. States like Maine and Oregon are taking legislative action with extended producer responsibility laws to ensure that manufacturers are accountable for the lifecycle environmental impact of their products.

=== Effects of plastic on land ===
Plastic pollution on land poses a threat to the plants and animals – including humans who are based on the land. Estimates of the amount of plastic concentration on land are between four and twenty three times that of the ocean. The amount of plastic poised on the land is greater and more concentrated than that in the water. Mismanaged plastic waste ranges from 60 percent in East Asia and Pacific to one percent in North America. It is estimated that between 1 million and 1.7 million tonnes of mismanaged plastic is transported to the ocean each year.

In 2021 a report conducted by the Food and Agriculture Organization stated that plastic is often used in agriculture. There is more plastic in the soil than in the oceans. The presence of plastic in the environment hurt ecosystems and human health and pose a threat to food safety. Chlorinated plastic can release harmful chemicals into the surrounding soil, which can then seep into groundwater or other surrounding water sources and also the ecosystem of the world. This can cause serious harm to the species that drink the water. A 2025 study confirmed that agricultural soil contain up to 23 times more plastic particles in comparison to the ocean. The particles can be absorbed by the crops through the roots and be eaten by humans. This create different health hazards, especially as the chemicals replacing BPA in the plastic can be more dangerouse than BPA itself.

==== Effect on flooding ====
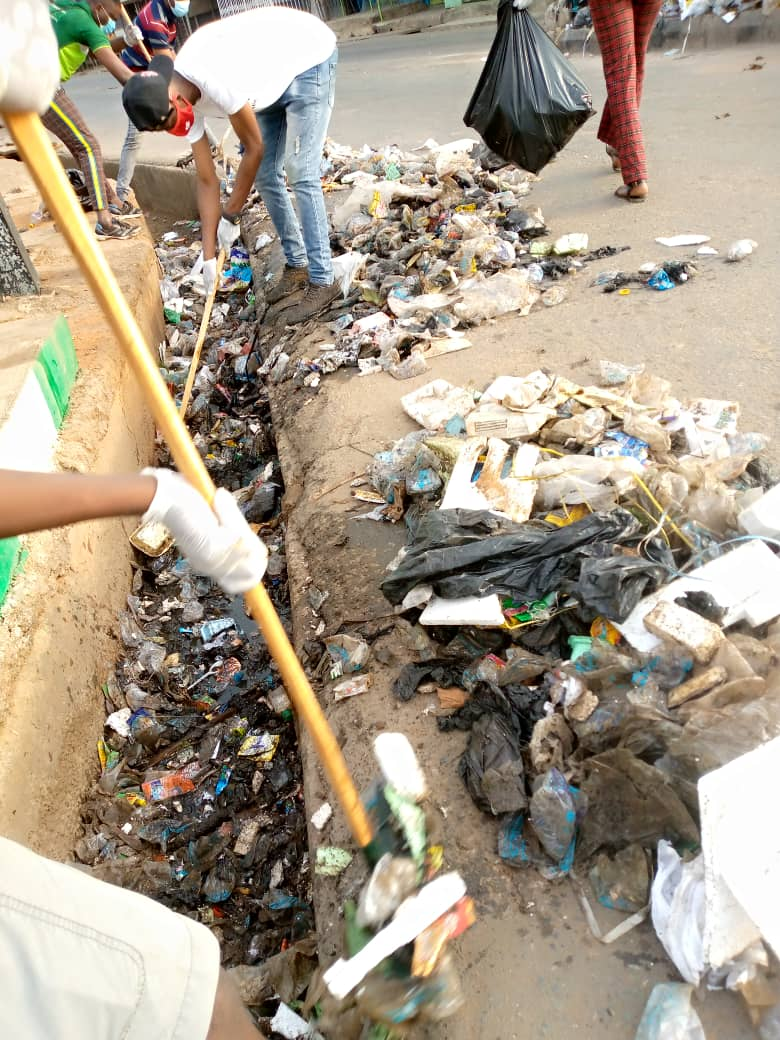
Volunteers clearing gutters in Ilorin, Nigeria during a volunteer sanitation day. Even when there is adequate infrastructure for sanitation, plastic pollution can prevent drainage and impede sewage flow.

Plastic waste can clog storm drains, and such clogging can increase flood damage, particularly in urban areas. A buildup of plastic garbage at trash cans raises the water level upstream and may enhance the risk of urban flooding. For example, in Bangkok flood risk increases substantially because of plastic waste clogging the already overburdened sewer system.

==== In tap water ====
A 2017 study found that 83% of tap water samples taken around the world contained plastic pollutants. This was the first study to focus on global drinking water pollution with plastics, and showed that with a contamination rate of 94%, tap water in the United States was the most polluted, followed by Lebanon and India. European countries such as the United Kingdom, Germany and France had the lowest contamination rate, though still as high as 72%. This means that people may be ingesting between 3,000 and 4,000 microparticles of plastic from tap water per year. The analysis found particles of more than 2.5 microns in size, which is 2500 times bigger than a nanometer. It is currently unclear if this contamination is affecting human health, but if the water is also found to contain nano-particle pollutants, there could be adverse impacts on human well-being, according to scientists associated with the study.

However, plastic tap water pollution remains under-studied, as are the links of how pollution transfers between humans, air, water, and soil.

==== In terrestrial ecosystems ====
Mismanaged plastic waste leads to plastic directly or indirectly entering terrestrial ecosystems. There has been a significant increase of microplastic pollution due to the poor handling and disposal of plastic materials. In particular, plastic pollution in the form of microplastics now can be found extensively in soil. It enters the soil by settling on the surface and eventually making its way into subsoils. These microplastics find their way into plants and animals.

Effluent and sludge of wastewater contain large amounts of plastics. Wastewater treatment plants do not have a treatment process to remove microplastics which results in plastics being transferred into water and soil when effluent and sludge are applied to land for agricultural purposes. Several researchers have found plastic microfibers that are released when fleece and other polyester textiles are cleaned in washing machines. These fibers can be transferred through effluent to land which pollutes soil environments.

The increase in plastic and microplastic pollution in soils can cause adverse impacts on plants and microorganisms in the soil, which can in turn affect soil fertility. Microplastics affect soil ecosystems that are important for plant growth. Plants are important for the environment and ecosystems so the plastics are damaging to plants and organisms living in these ecosystems.

Microplastics alter soil biophysical properties which affect the quality of the soil. This affects soil biological activity, biodiversity and plant health. Microplastics in the soil alter a plant's growth. It decreases seedling germination, affects the number of leaves, stem diameter and chlorophyll content in these plants.

Microplastics in the soil are a risk not only to soil biodiversity but also food safety and human health. Soil biodiversity is important for plant growth in agricultural industries. Agricultural activities such as plastic mulching and application of municipal wastes contribute to the microplastic pollution in the soil. Human-modified soils are commonly used to improve crop productivity but the effects are more damaging than helpful.

Plastics also release toxic chemicals into the environment and cause physical, chemical harm and biological damage to organisms. Ingestion of plastic does not only lead to death in animals through intestinal blockage but it can also travel up the food chain which affects humans.

=== Effects of plastic on oceans and seabirds ===
A variety of marine life is endangered due to plastic pollution, ranging from zooplankton to large marine mammals. It was shown that more than 900 marine species are affected by plastic pollution (not including smaller organisms). Marine wildlife such as seabirds, whales, fish and turtles mistake plastic waste for prey and ingest plastic objects or particles, including microplastics. This has an impact, ranging from lacerations, infections, reduced ability to swim, internal injuries to death due to blocked stomachs and guts . "Globally, 100,000 marine mammals die every year as a result of plastic pollution. This includes whales, dolphins, porpoises, seals and sea lions". Another impact is caused by entanglement, meaning that marine wildlife gets trapped and ensnared by plastic debris such as fishing gear and plastic objects containing loops.

Plastic waste emitted to the ocean per capita

Plastic waste emitted to the ocean

Probability of mismanaged plastic waste being emitted to ocean

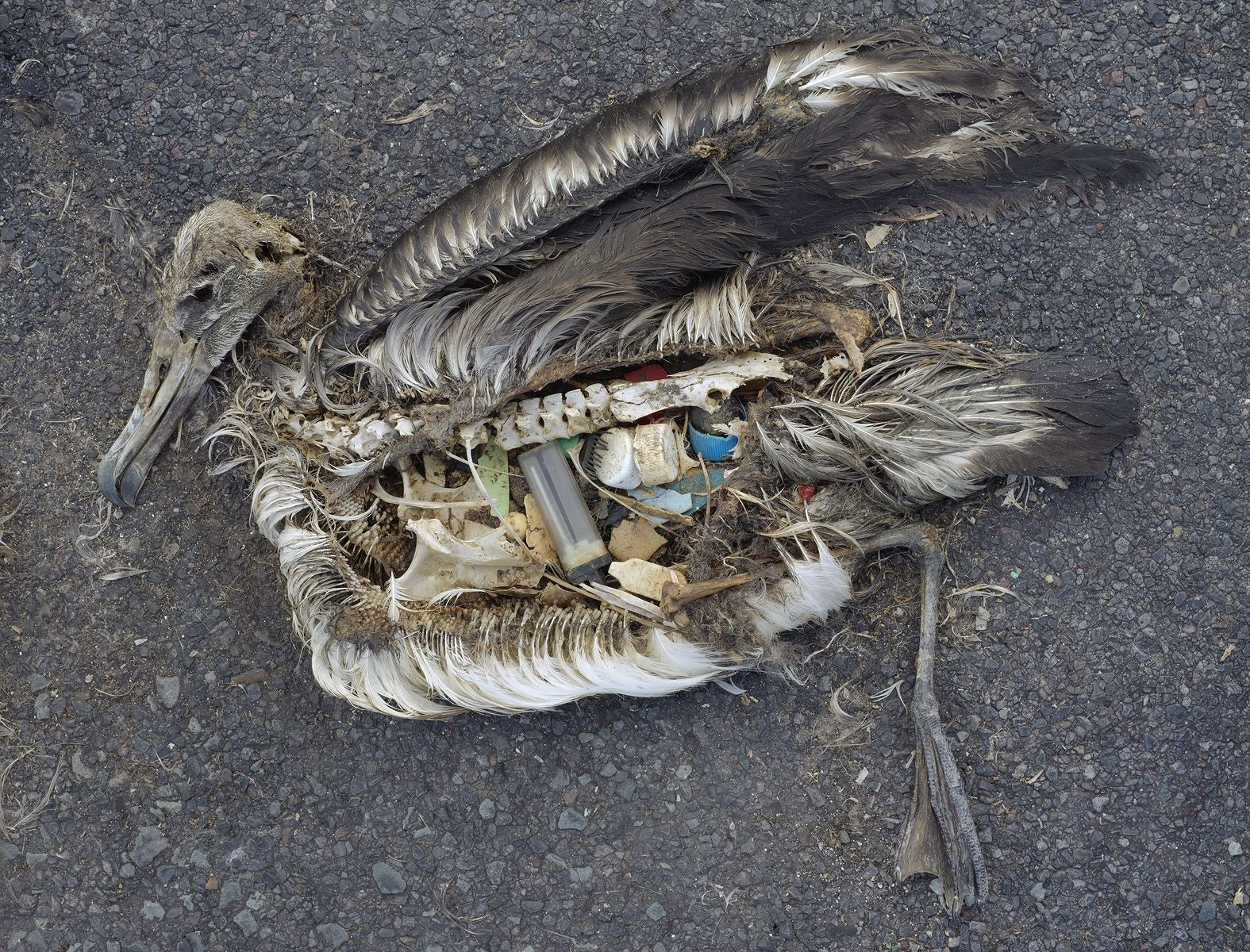
The unaltered stomach contents of a dead albatross chick photographed on Midway Atoll National Wildlife Refuge in the Pacific in September 2009 include plastic marine debris fed to the chick by its parents

Herring gull picking at a "yellow bag" (household plastic waste collection in Germany), looking for food (northern Germany)

=== Effects on freshwater ecosystems ===
Research into freshwater plastic pollution has been largely ignored over marine ecosystems, comprising only 13% of published papers on the topic.

Plastics make their way into bodies of freshwater, underground aquifers, and moving freshwaters through runoff and erosion of mismanaged plastic waste (MMPW). In some areas, the direct waste disposal into rivers is a remaining factor of historical practices, and has only been somewhat limited by modern legislation. Rivers are the primary transport of plastics into marine ecosystems, sourcing potentially 80% of the plastic pollution in the oceans. Research on the top ten river catchments ranked by annual amount of MMPW showed that some rivers contribute as high as 88–95% of ocean-bound plastics, the highest being the Yangtze River into the East China Sea.

Asian rivers contribute 86% of plastic waste found in the ocean annually, largely influenced by the high density coastal populations all throughout the continent as well as relatively intense bouts of seasonal rainfall.

Just 5% to 10% come from rivers across Europe and North America. However, Our World in Data estimates that possibly up to 5% of ocean plastics stem from rich countries exporting their waste, which could make the rich country total share up to 10%. Japan, Hongkong and other OECD countries are included in that number. For example, the U.S. exported 5% of its plastic waste in 2010.

Around 5 million tonnes (or 2%) of plastic waste was traded globally in 2020. That fell by two-thirds from 2010 to 2020. Moreover, most of that 2% ends up into richer countries, therefore, not likely into oceans. China's share of imports fell to 1% in 2018, due to its bans in 2017. Most plastic is traded within regions, not between regions. Europe both exported and imported more plastic than other regions.

==== Impacts on freshwater biodiversity ====
===== Invertebrates =====
A study analyzing ingestion of plastics across a variety of previously published experiments showed that out of the 206 species covered, the majority of papers documented ingestion in fish. This does not quite mean that fish ingest plastic more than other organisms, but instead highlights the underrepresentation of plastic effects in equally important organisms, like aquatic plants, amphibians and invertebrates. Despite this disparity, controlled experiments analyzing microplastic impact on aquatic plants like the algae Chlorella spp and common duckweed Lemna minor have yielded significant results. Between microplastics of polypropylene (PP) and polyvinyl chloride (PVC), PVC demonstrated greater toxicity to Chlorella pyrenoidosa, overall negatively impacting their photosynthetic ability. This effect on photosynthesis is likely due to the 60% reduction of algal chlorophyll a associated with high PVC concentrations found in the same study. When analyzing the effect of polyethylene microbeads (origin: cosmetic exfoliants) on the aquatic macrophyte L. minor, no effect on photosynthetic pigments and productivity was found, but root growth and root cell viability decreased. These results are concerning as plants and algae are integral to nutrient and gas cycling within an aquatic system, and have the capacity to create significant changes in water composition due to their sheer density. Crustaceans have also been analyzed for their response to plastic presence. There is proof that freshwater crustaceans, specifically European crabs and crayfish, suffer entanglement in polyamide ghost nets used in lake fishing. When exposed to plastic nanoparticles of polystyrene, Daphnia galeata (common water flea) experienced reduced survival within 48 hours as well as reproductive issues. Over a span of 5 days, the amount of pregnant Daphnia decreased by nearly 50%, and less than 20% of exposed embryos survived without any immediate repercussions. Other arthropods, like juvenile stages of insects are susceptible to similar plastic exposure as some spend part of their adolescence fully submerged in a freshwater resource. This similarity in lifestyle to other aquatic invertebrates indicates that insects may experience similar side effects of plastic exposure.

===== Vertebrates =====
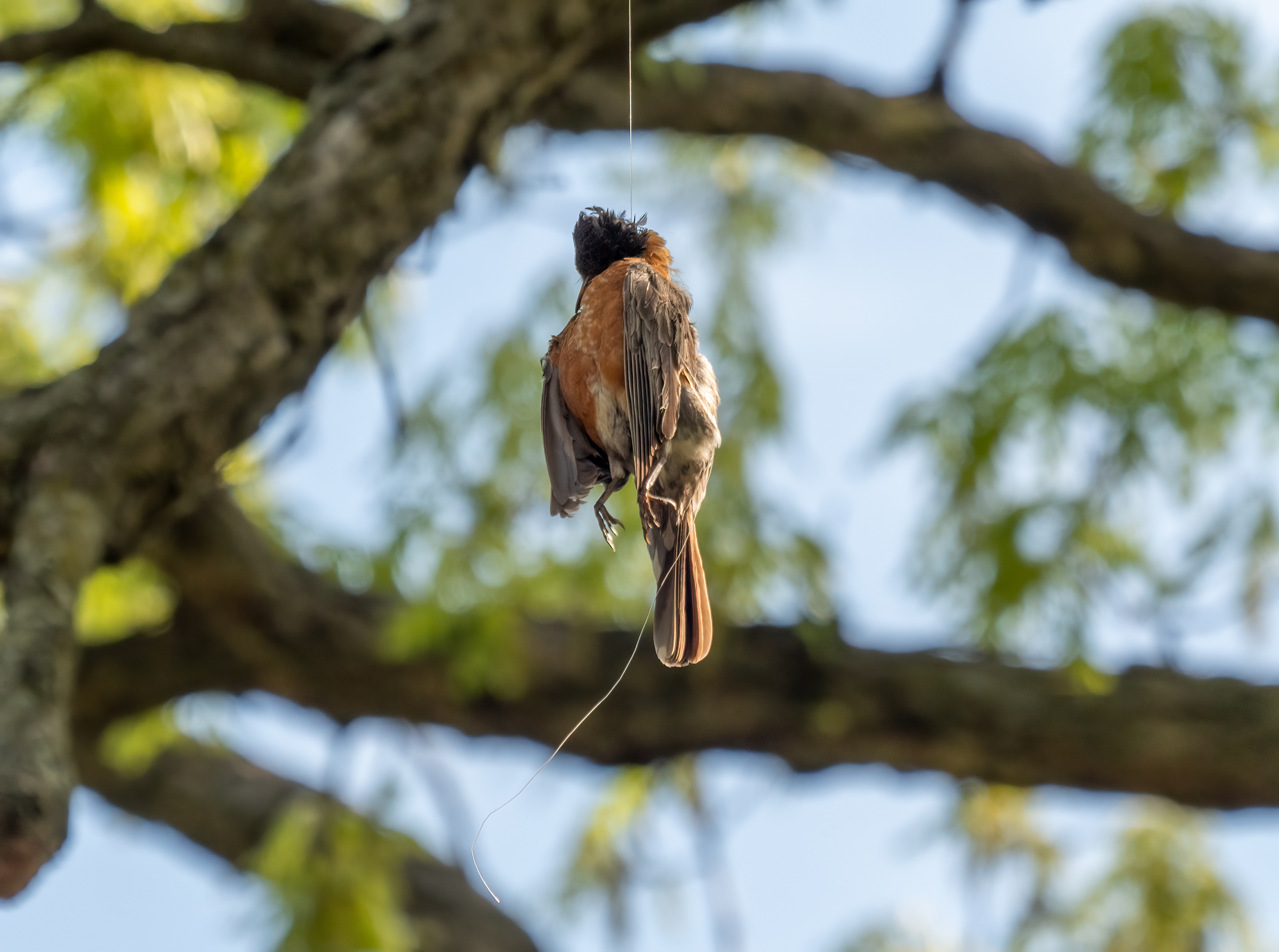
An American robin dead after becoming tangled in discarded fishing line

Plastic exposure in amphibians has mostly been studied in adolescent life stages, when the test subjects are still dependent on an aquatic environment where it can be easier to manipulate variables experimentally. Studies on a common South American freshwater frog, Physalaemus cuvieri indicated that plastics may have the potential to induce mutagenic and cytotoxic morphological changes. Much more research needs to be done on amphibian response to plastic pollution, especially since amphibians can serve as initial indicator species of environmental decline. Freshwater mammals and birds have long been known to have negative interactions with plastic pollution, often resulting in entanglement or suffocation/choking after ingesting. While inflammation within the gastrointestinal tract in both groups has been noted, unfortunately there is little to no data on the toxicological effects of plastic pollutants in these organisms. Fish have been studied the most regarding plastic pollution in freshwater organisms, with the majority of studies indicating evidence of plastic ingestion in wild-caught samples and lab specimens. There have been some attempts to look at lethality of plastics in a common freshwater model species, Danio rerio, aka zebrafish. Increased mucus production and inflammation response in the D. rerio GI tract was noted, but additionally, researchers noted a distinct shift in the microbial communities within the zebrafish intestinal microbiome. This finding is significant, as research within the last few decades has increasingly revealed how much power intestinal microbiomes have regarding their host's nutrient absorption and endocrine systems. Because of this, plastics may have a far more drastic effect on individual organism health than is currently known so far, thus warranting the need for further research as soon as possible. Many of these findings also have been found in a laboratory setting, so more effort needs to be channeled into measuring plastic abundance and toxicology in wild populations.

=== Effects on humans ===
Plastic pollution can also impact human health, as plastic particles and associated chemicals may enter the body through food, water, and air.

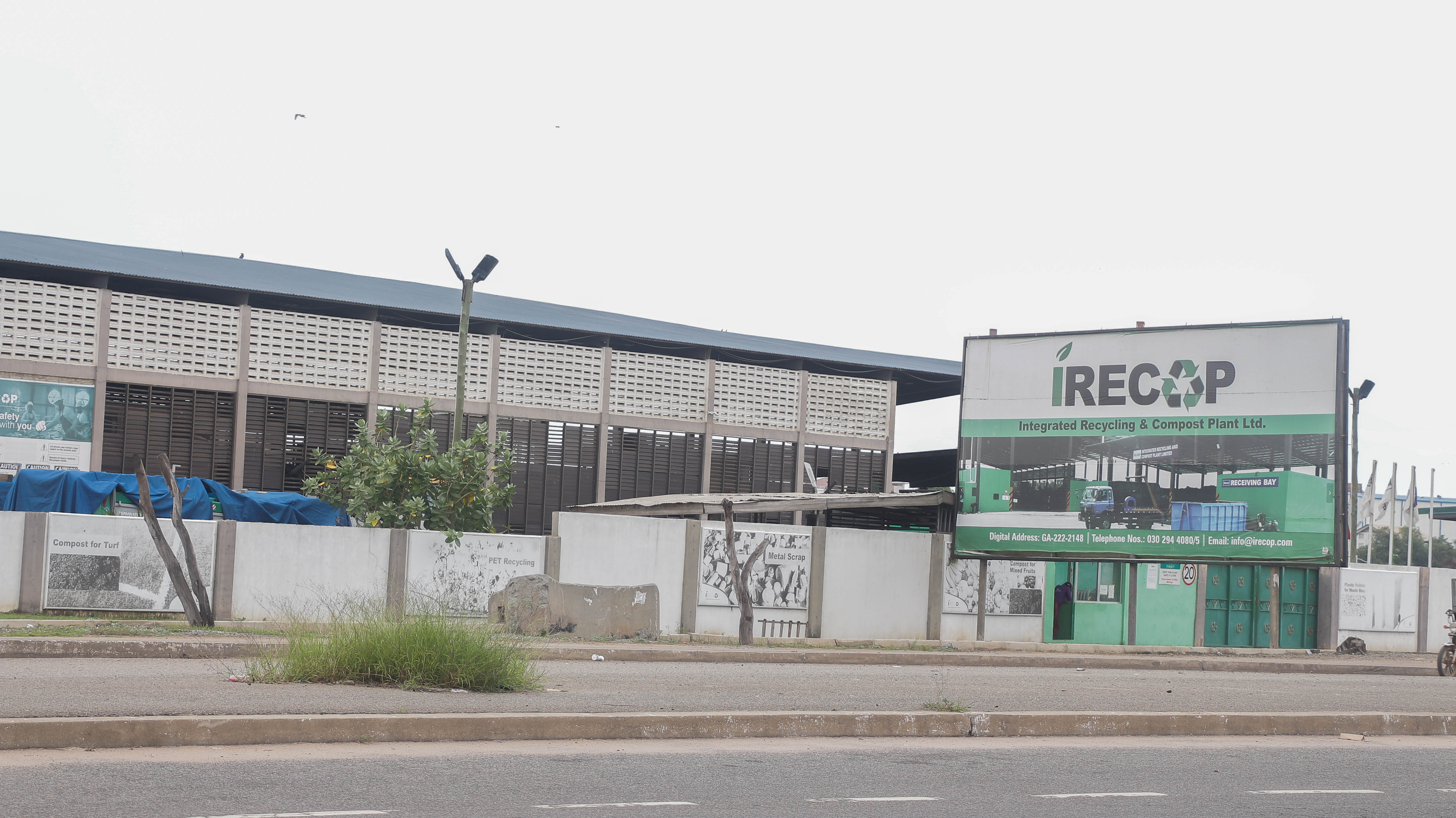
The site where the refuse is being recycled in Ghana

Compounds that are used in manufacturing pollute the environment by releasing chemicals into the air and water. Some compounds that are used in plastics, such as phthalates, bisphenol A (BPA), polybrominated diphenyl ether (PBDE), are under close statute and might be very harmful. Even though these compounds are unsafe, they have been used in the manufacturing of food packaging, medical devices, flooring materials, bottles, perfumes, cosmetics and much more. Inhalation of microplastics (MPs) have been shown to be one of the major contributors to MP uptake in humans. MPs in the form of dust particles are circulated constantly through ventilation and air conditioning systems indoors. The large dosage of these compounds are hazardous to humans, destroying the endocrine system. BPA imitates the female's hormone called estrogen. PBD destroys and causes damage to thyroid hormones, which are vital hormone glands that play a major role in the metabolism, growth and development of the human body. MPs can also have a detrimental effect on male reproductive success. MPs such as BPA can interfere with steroid biosynthesis in the male endocrine system and with early stages of spermatogenesis. MPs in men can also create oxidative stress and DNA damage in spermatozoa, causing reduced sperm viability. Although the level of exposure to these chemicals varies depending on age and geography, most humans experience simultaneous exposure to many of these chemicals. Average levels of daily exposure are below the levels deemed to be unsafe, but more research needs to be done on the effects of low dose exposure on humans. A lot is unknown on how severely humans are physically affected by these chemicals. Some of the chemicals used in plastic production can cause dermatitis upon contact with human skin. In many plastics, these toxic chemicals are only used in trace amounts, but significant testing is often required to ensure that the toxic elements are contained within the plastic by inert material or polymer. Children and women during their reproduction age are at most at risk and more prone to damaging their immune as well as their reproductive system from these hormone-disrupting chemicals. Pregnancy and nursing products such as baby bottles, pacifiers, and plastic feeding utensils place infants and children at a very high risk of exposure.

Human health has also been negatively impacted by plastic pollution. "Almost a third of groundwater sites in the US contain BPA. BPA is harmful at very low concentrations as it interferes with our hormone and reproductive systems. This quote tells us how much of a percentage of our water is contaminated and should not be drunk on a daily basis. "At every stage of its lifecycle, plastic poses distinct risks to human health, arising from both exposure to plastic particles themselves and associated chemicals". This quote is an intro to numerous points of why plastic is damaging to us, such as the carbon that is released when it is being made and transported which is also related to how plastic pollution harms our environment.

A 2022 study published in Environment International found microplastic in the blood of 80% of people tested in the study, and such microplastic has the potential to become embedded in human organs.

==== Clinical significance ====
Due to the pervasiveness of plastic products, most of the human population is constantly exposed to the chemical components of plastics. In the United States, 95% of adults have had detectable levels of BPA in their urine. Exposure to chemicals such as BPA have been correlated with disruptions in fertility, reproduction, sexual maturation, and other health effects. Specific phthalates have also resulted in similar biological effects.

===== Thyroid hormone axis =====
Bisphenol A affects gene expression related to the thyroid hormone axis, which affects biological functions such as metabolism and development. BPA can decrease thyroid hormone receptor (TR) activity by increasing TR transcriptional corepressor activity. This then decreases the level of thyroid hormone binding proteins that bind to triiodothyronine. By affecting the thyroid hormone axis, BPA exposure can lead to hypothyroidism.

===== Sex hormones =====
BPA can disrupt normal, physiological levels of sex hormones. It does this by binding to globulins that normally bind to sex hormones such as androgens and estrogens, leading to the disruption of the balance between the two. BPA can also affect the metabolism or the catabolism of sex hormones. It often acts as an antiandrogen or as an estrogen, which can cause disruptions in gonadal development and sperm production.

=== Disease ===
In 2023, plasticosis, a new disease caused solely by plastics, was discovered in seabirds. The birds identified as having the disease have scarred digestive tracts from ingesting plastic waste. "When birds ingest small pieces of plastic, they found, it inflames the digestive tract. Over time, the persistent inflammation causes tissues to become scarred and disfigured, affecting digestion, growth and survival."

== Removal of plastic pollution ==
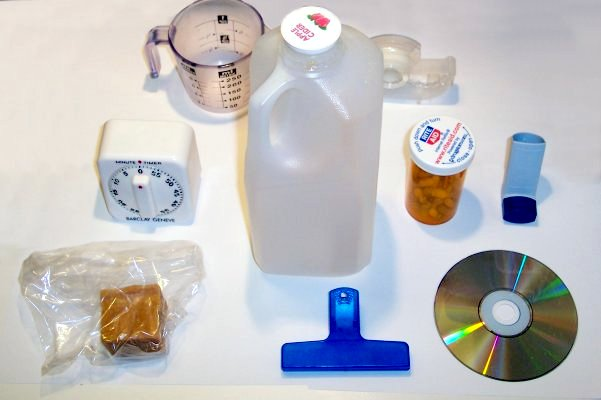
Household items made of various types of plastic.

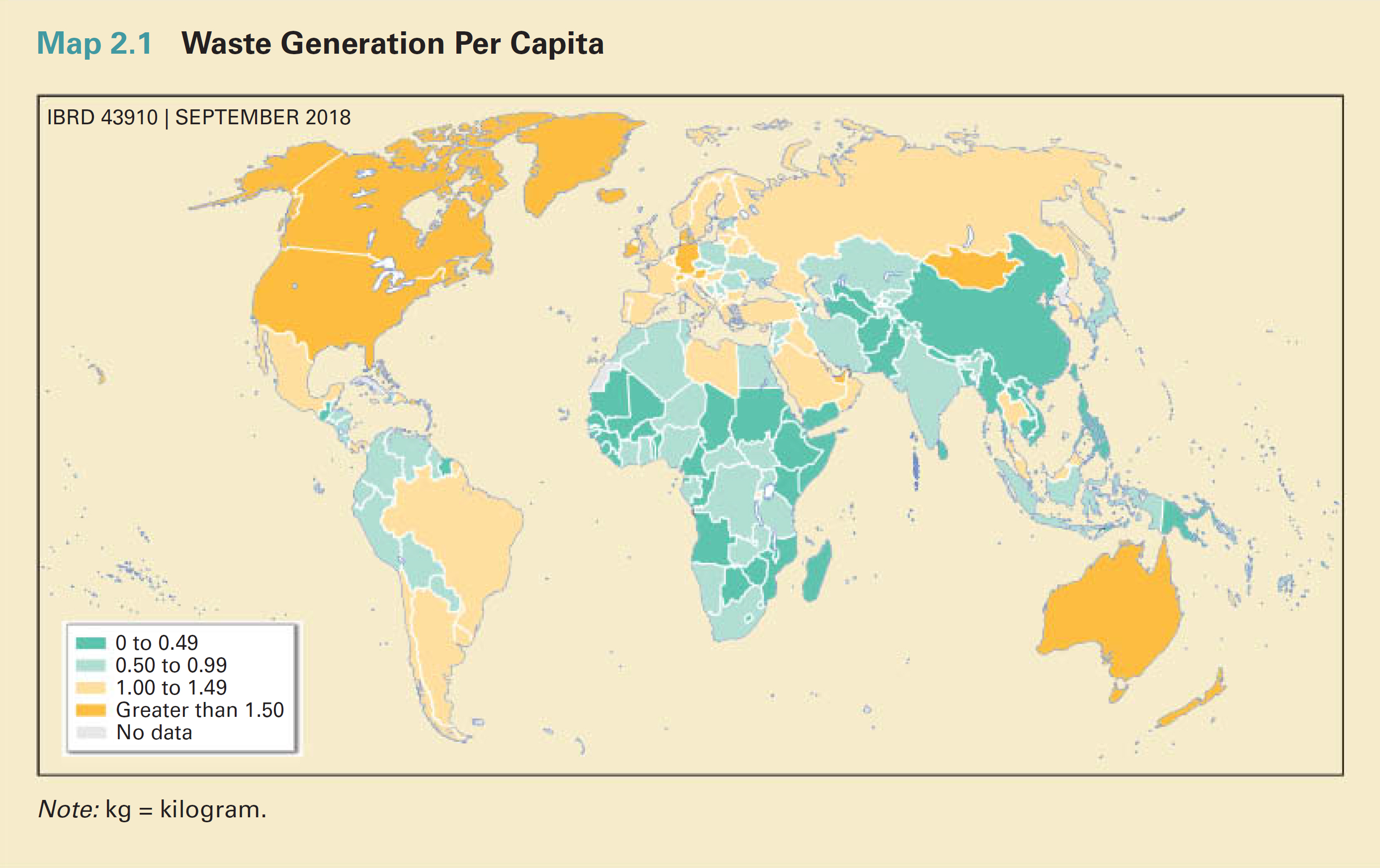
Waste generation, measured in kilograms per person per day

Plastics are removed from the environment by the following pathways in order of scale:

- landfilling (271 Mton/y)
- incineration (168 Mton/y)
- recycling (121 Mton/y)

=== Incineration ===
Incineration is a major pathway for disposal of plastics. An estimated 168 Mtons of plastic was incinerated in 2024. As of 2021, about 12% of plastics ever produced had been incinerated. Incineration produces gaseous emissions that sometimes contain toxins.

=== Recycling and biodegradables ===
The scale of biodegradable plastics is negligible in comparison to the commodity materials.

Recycling is practiced on a large scale. A significant amount of PET is recycled. Recycled polymers are inferior to their precursors. It has been said that recycling is better described as "postponed" landfilling. The use of biodegradable plastics has many advantages and disadvantages. Biodegradables are biopolymers that degrade in industrial composters. Biodegradables do not degrade as efficiently in domestic composters, and during this slower process, methane gas may be emitted.

=== Decomposition of plastics ===
Average estimated decomposition times of typical marine debris items. Plastic items are shown in blue.

Polymer degradation, especially of commodity plastics is slow, hence the persistence of plastic debris. The Ocean Conservancy has predicted the decomposition rates of several plastic products. It is estimated that a foam plastic cup will take 50 years, a plastic beverage holder will take 400 years, a disposable nappy will take 450 years, and fishing line will take 600 years to degrade.

Some plastics are intentionally degradable, either by the design of the polymer or by the inclusion of certain additives. Such materials are produced on such small scale that their impact on plastic pollution is negligible.

==== Plastic "eating" organisms ====
A recurring theme in the popular literature and some technical journals is the possible role of organisms, especially bacteria, which might degrade ("eat") plastics. A 2021 study states that there is no current evidence that these novel enzymes are breaking down any meaningful amount of plastic to reduce pollution. An optimistic interpretation of the data are that if such processes occur, they are extremely slow.

== Policy, regulation, social action ==
Share of inadequately managed plastic waste (2010)

Projected share of inadequately managed plastic waste (2025)

Several researchers reviewed plastic pollution policies of different countries and found that plastic bags were most frequently addressed by governments, mostly by banning their use or by leveraging a fee for their use, followed by legislation on other types of pollutants such as plastic cutlery and microbeads.

Agencies such as the US Environmental Protection Agency and US Food and Drug Administration often do not assess the safety of new chemicals until after a negative side effect is shown. Once they suspect a chemical may be toxic, it is studied to determine the human reference dose, which is determined to be the lowest observable adverse effect level. During these studies, a high dose is tested to see if it causes any adverse health effects, and if it does not, lower doses are considered to be safe as well. This does not take into account the fact that with some chemicals found in plastics, such as BPA, lower doses can have a discernible effect. Even with this often complex evaluation process, policies have been put into place in order to help alleviate plastic pollution and its effects. Government regulations have been implemented that ban some chemicals from being used in specific plastic products.

In Canada, the United States, and the European Union, BPA has been banned from being incorporated in the production of baby bottles and children's cups, due to health concerns and the higher vulnerability of younger children to the effects of BPA. Taxes have been established in order to discourage specific ways of managing plastic waste. The landfill tax, for example, creates an incentive to choose to recycle plastics rather than contain them in landfills, by making the latter more expensive. There has also been a standardization of the types of plastics that can be considered compostable. The European Norm EN 13432, which was set by the European Committee for Standardization (CEN), lists the standards that plastics must meet, in terms of compostability and biodegradability, in order to officially be labeled as compostable.

Given the significant threat that oceans face, the European Investment Bank Group aims to increase its funding and advisory assistance for ocean cleanup. For example, the Clean Oceans Initiative (COI) was established in 2018. The European Investment Bank, the German Development Bank, and the French Development Agency (AFD) agreed to invest a total of €2 billion under the COI from October 2018 to October 2023 in initiatives aimed at reducing pollution discharge into the oceans, with a special focus on plastics.

The Clean Ocean Initiative plans to give €4 billion in funding towards decreasing plastic waste at sea by the end of 2025. Improved wastewater treatment in Sri Lanka, Egypt, and South Africa are some examples, as is solid waste management in Togo and Senegal.

=== Voluntary reduction efforts failing ===
Major plastic producers continue to lobby governments to refrain from imposing restrictions on plastic production and to advocate for voluntary corporate targets to reduce new plastic output. However, the world's top 10 plastic producers, including The Coca-Cola Company, Nestle SA and PepsiCo have been failing to meet even their own minimum targets for virgin plastic use.

The export of plastic waste from rich countries to poorer countries has been well documented. Differences between countries in environmental policy and costs relating to taxes, disposal, and transport, are important determinants on legal and illegal international traffic in hazardous and nonhazardous waste and scrap products, including plastics.

There have been several international covenants which address marine plastic pollution, such as the Convention on the Prevention of Marine Pollution by Dumping of Wastes and Other Matter 1972, the International Convention for the Prevention of Pollution from Ships, 1973 and the Honolulu Strategy, there is nothing around plastics which infiltrate the ocean from the land.

In 2019, the Basel Convention was amended to include plastic waste. 187 countries agreed to limit the export of plastic waste following rules from the Basel Convention. The Convention prohibits Parties from trading with non-Parties (e.g. United States) unless the countries have a pre-determined agreement that meets Basel criteria. During January 2021, the first month that the agreement was in effect, trade data showed that overall scrap exports from the U.S. actually increased.

=== Legally binding plastics treaty ===
Many academics and NGOs believe that a legally binding international treaty to deal with plastic pollution is necessary as plastic pollution is an international problem, moving between maritime borders, and also because they believe there needs to be a cap on plastic production.

In 2022, United Nation member states agreed to devise a global plastic pollution treaty by 2024, under United Nations Environment Assembly mandate 5/14. After six negotiation sessions no legally binding agreement was obtained by August 2025.

=== Waste import bans ===
Since around 2017, China, Turkey, Malaysia, Cambodia, and Thailand have banned certain waste imports. It has been suggested that such bans may increase automation and recycling, decreasing negative impacts on the environment.

According to an analysis of global trade data by the nonprofit Basel Action Network, violations of the Basel Convention, active since 1 January 2021, have been rampant during 2021. The U.S., Canada, and the European Union have sent hundreds of millions of tons of plastic to countries with insufficient waste management infrastructure, where much of it is landfilled, burned, or littered into the environment.

=== Circular economy policies ===
Laws related to recyclability, waste management, domestic materials recovery facilities, product composition, biodegradability and prevention of import/export of specific wastes may support prevention of plastic pollution. A study considers producer/manufacturer responsibility "a practical approach toward addressing the issue of plastic pollution", suggesting that "Existing and adopted policies, legislations, regulations, and initiatives at global, regional, and national level play a vital role".

Standardization of products, especially of packaging which are, as of 2022, often composed of different materials (each and across products) that are hard or currently impossible to either separate or recycle together in general or in an automated way could support recyclability and recycling.

For instance, there are systems that can theoretically distinguish between and sort 12 types of plastics such as PET using hyperspectral imaging and algorithms developed via machine learning while only an estimated 9% of the estimated 6.3 billion tonnes of plastic waste from the 1950s up to 2018 has been recycled (12% has been incinerated and the rest reportedly being "dumped in landfills or the natural environment").

=== Collection, recycling and reduction ===
The two common forms of waste collection include curbside collection and the use of drop-off recycling centers. About 87 percent of the population in the United States (273 million people) have access to curbside and drop-off recycling centers. In curbside collection, which is available to about 63 percent of the United States population (193 million people), people place designated plastics in a special bin to be picked up by a public or private hauling company. Most curbside programs collect more than one type of plastic resin, usually both PETE and HDPE. At drop-off recycling centers, which are available to 68 percent of the United States population (213 million people), people take their recyclables to a centrally located facility. Once collected, the plastics are delivered to a materials recovery facility (MRF) or handler for sorting into single-resin streams to increase product value. The sorted plastics are then baled to reduce shipping costs to reclaimers.

There are varying rates of recycling per type of plastic, and in 2017, the overall plastic recycling rate was approximately 8.4% in the United States. Approximately 2.7 million tonnes (3.0 million short tons) of plastics were recycled in the U.S. in 2017, while 24.3 million tonnes (26.8 million short tons) plastic were dumped in landfills the same year. Some plastics are recycled more than others; in 2017 about 31.2 percent of HDPE bottles and 29.1 percent of PET bottles and jars were recycled.

Reusable packaging refers to packaging that is manufactured of durable materials and is specifically designed for multiple trips and extended life. There are zero-waste stores and refill shops for selected products as well as conventional supermarkets that enable refilling of selected plastics-packaged products or voluntarily sell products with no or more sustainable packaging.

On 21 May 2019, a new service model called "Loop" to collect packaging from consumers and reuse it, began to function in the New York region, US, supported by multiple larger companies. Consumers drop packages in special shipping totes and then a pick up collect, clean, refill and return them. It has begun with several thousand households and aims to not only stop single use plastic, but to stop single use generally by recycling consumer product containers of various materials.

Reducing plastic waste could support recycling and is often taken together with recycling: the "3R" refer to Reduce, Reuse and Recycle.

==== Ocean cleanup ====
The organization "The Ocean Cleanup" is trying to collect plastic waste from the oceans by nets. There are concerns from harm to some forms of sea organisms, especially neuston.

==== Great Bubble Barrier ====
In the Netherlands, plastic litter from some rivers is collected by a bubble barrier, to prevent plastics from floating into the sea. This so-called 'Great Bubble Barrier' catches plastics bigger than 1 mm. The bubble barrier is implemented in the River IJssel (2017) and in Amsterdam (2019) and will be implemented in Katwijk at the end of the river Rhine.

=== Mapping and tracking ===
Our World In Data provides graphics about some analyses, including maps, to show sources of plastic pollution – including that of oceans in specific.

Identifying largest sources of ocean plastics in high fidelity may help to discern causes, to measure progress and to develop effective countermeasures.

A large fraction of ocean plastics may come from – also non-imported – plastic waste of coastal cities as well as from rivers (with top 1000 rivers estimated by one 2021 study to account for 80% of global annual emissions). These two sources may be interlinked. The Yangtze river into the East China Sea is identified by some studies that use sampling evidence as the highest plastic-emitting (sampled) river, in contrast to the beforementioned 2021 study that ranks it at place 64. Management interventions at the local level at coastal areas were found to be crucial to the global success of reducing plastic pollution.

There is one global, interactive machine learning- and satellite monitoring-based, map of plastic waste sites which could help identify who and where mismanages plastic waste, dumping it into oceans.

=== By country/region ===
==== Albania ====
In July 2018, Albania became the first country in Europe to ban lightweight plastic bags. Albania's environment minister Blendi Klosi said that businesses importing, producing or trading plastic bags less than 35 microns in thickness risk facing fines between 1 million to 1.5 million lek (€7,900 to €11,800).

==== Australia ====
It has been estimated that each year, Australia produces around 2.5m tonnes of plastic waste annually, of which about 84% ends up as landfill, and around 130,000 tonnes of plastic waste leaks into the environment. Six of the eight states and territories had by December 2021 committed to banning a range of plastics. The federal government's National Packaging Targets created the goal of phasing out the worst of single-use plastics by 2025, and under the National Plastics Plan 2021, it has committed "to phase out loose fill and moulded polystyrene packaging by July 2022, and various other products by December 2022.

An Australian single-use plastic reduction initiative, Plastic Free July, that began in 2011 in Perth, Western Australia has gained a significant global outreach. As of 2022, it had a record 140 million participants making conscious changes and reducing their waste by 2.6 million tonnes in 2022. In 2022, in recognition of its contributions to promoting single-use plastic pollution solutions, Plastic Free July was one of two finalists in the annual UN Sustainable Development Action Awards.

Recent research highlights that Australia's current plastic waste policies, which focus heavily on recycling, are failing—only 14% of plastic waste is recovered, and overall consumption is projected to more than double by 2050. Its recommended to pus towards policies that reduce plastic production and consumption, such as implementing a plastics tax and extended producer responsibility schemes, to effectively address the growing plastic waste crisis.

==== Canada ====
In the year 2022 Canada announced a ban on producing and importing single use plastic from December 2022. The sale of those items will be banned from December 2023 and the export from 2025. The prime minister of Canada Justin Trudeau pledged to ban single use plastic in 2019.

==== China ====
China is the biggest consumer of single-use plastics. In 2020 China published a plan to cut 30% of plastic waste in five years. As part of this plan, single use plastic bags and straws will be banned.

==== European Union ====
In 2015 the European Union adopted a directive requiring a reduction in the consumption of single use plastic bags per person to 90 by 2019 and to 40 by 2025. In April 2019, the EU adopted a further directive banning almost all types of single use plastic, except bottles, from the beginning of the year 2021.

On 3 July 2021, the EU Single-Use Plastics Directive (SUPD, EU 2019/904) went into effect within EU member states. The directive aims to reduce plastic pollution from single-use disposable plastics. It focuses on the 10 most commonly found disposable plastics at beaches, which make up 43% of marine litter (fishing gear another 27%). According to the directive, there is a ban on plastic cotton buds and balloon sticks, plastic plates, cutlery, stirrers and straws, Styrofoam drinks and food packaging (e.g. disposable cups and one-person meals), products made of oxo-degradable plastic, which degrade into microplastics, while cigarette filters, drinking cups, wet wipes, sanitary towels and tampons receive a label indicating the product contains plastic, that it belongs in the trash, and that litter has negative effects on the environment. Article 8 of the directive also supports the use of extended producer responsibility schemes relating to plastic waste.

In December 2022 the EU took the first steps for banning the export of plastic waste to other countries. Agreement between the European Parliament and the European Council on a revision to the Waste Shipment Regulation, which will cover this matter, was reached on 17 November 2023.

Overall, the EU has enacted multiple policies to address plastic pollution, most of which cover the waste stage of plastics and not the entire lifecycle of plastic products.

==== France ====
In 2021 France banned "free plastic bottles, plastic confetti, and single-use plastic bags", in 2022 restrictions were made on plastic packaging and toys and in the first of January 2023 many types of single use plastic were banned from restaurants that have more than 20 places. Some were concerned the measures will not be implemented well due to the current energy crisis.

==== India ====
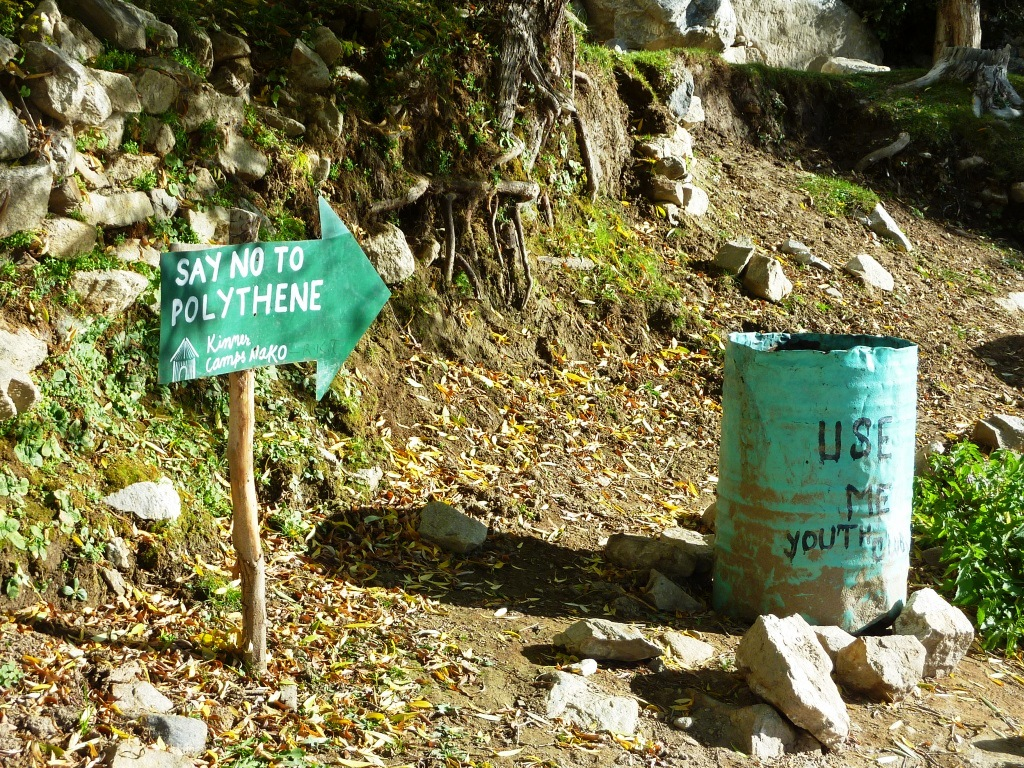
Say no to polythene. Sign. Nako, Himachal Pradesh, India.

The government of India decided to ban single use plastics and take a number of measures to recycle and reuse plastic from 2 October 2019.

The Ministry of Drinking Water and Sanitation, Government of India, has requested various governmental departments to avoid the use of plastic bottles to provide drinking water during governmental meetings, etc., and to instead make arrangements for providing drinking water that do not generate plastic waste. The state of Sikkim has restricted the usage of plastic water bottles (in government functions and meetings) and styrofoam products. The state of Bihar has banned the usage of plastic water bottles in governmental meetings.

The 2015 National Games of India, organised in Thiruvananthapuram, was associated with green protocols. This was initiated by Suchitwa Mission that aimed for "zero-waste" venues. To make the event "disposable-free", there was ban on the usage of disposable water bottles. The event witnessed the usage of reusable tableware and stainless steel tumblers. Athletes were provided with refillable steel flasks. It is estimated that these green practices stopped the generation of 120 tonnes of disposable waste.

The City of Bangalore in 2016 banned the plastic for all purpose other than for few special cases like milk delivery etc.

The state of Maharashtra, India effected the Maharashtra Plastic and Thermocol Products ban 23 June 2018, subjecting plastic users to fines and potential imprisonment for repeat offenders.

In the year 2022 India has begun to implement a country wide ban on different sorts of plastic. This is necessary also for achieving the climate targets of the country as in plastic production are used more than 8,000 additives, part of them are thousands times more powerful greenhouse gases than CO_{2}.

Garbage cafe's are an Indian initiative to address plastic pollution and hunger. In these cafe's people can exchange plastic waste for meals. The first reported garbage cafe opened in 2019 in Ambikapur, India, near the city's main bus station. The cafe's slogan is "more the waste, better the taste", and they offer 1 kilogram of plastic could be exchanged for a full lunch or dinner, and 500 grams for breakfast. The collected waste was sent to recycling centers or used in road construction projects.

==== Indonesia ====
In Bali, one of the many islands of Indonesia, two sisters, Melati and Isabel Wijsen, made efforts to ban plastic bags in 2019. As of January 2022 their organization Bye Bye Plastic Bags had spread to over 50 locations around the world.

==== Israel ====
In Israel, two cities: Eilat and Herzliya, decided to ban the usage of single use plastic bags and cutlery on the beaches. In 2020 Tel Aviv joined them, banning also the sale of single use plastic on the beaches.

==== Kenya ====
In August 2017, Kenya has one of the world's harshest plastic bag bans. Fines of $38,000 or up to four years in jail to anyone that was caught producing, selling, or using a plastic bag.

==== New Zealand ====
New Zealand announced a ban on many types of hard-to-recycle single use plastic by 2025. The first implementation of this is banning the sale and manufacture of most types of plastic microbeads in 2018, with fines of up to $100,000 for breaking the law.

Single-use plastic shopping bags were banned from sale and distribution with customers in 2019, which was first introduced by the Ministry for the Environment in 2018. These were substituted by reusable shopping bags made of nylon, polypropylene, or polyester.

Starting from 1st October, 2022, the New Zealand government banned on the sale of single-use plastic drink single-use plastic cotton buds, single-use plastic drink stirrers, food trays and takeaway containers made of polystyrene and PVC, and plastics that are capable of fragmenting into microplastics due to additives.

The sale of plastic produce bags, plastic straws for general use, and plastic cutlery and other plastic tableware were banned starting from 1st July 2023. However, an exception for plastic drinking straws applies for people who have a disability or special health needs. Since the ban, plastic produce bags are commonly substituted with paper-based versions. Barrier bags for seafood and deli departments still use plastic.

A third phase was proposed for 2025, but was removed by the New Zealand government. The initial plan was to apply a further restriction to polystyrene and PVC containers for food and drink.

==== Nigeria ====
In 2019, The House of Representatives of Nigeria banned the production, import and usage of plastic bags in the country.

==== Spain ====
Spain banned several types of single use plastic at the beginning of the year 2023.

==== Taiwan ====
In February 2018, Taiwan restricted the use of single-use plastic cups, straws, utensils and bags; the ban will also include an extra charge for plastic bags and updates their recycling regulations and aiming by 2030 it would be completely enforced.

==== United Kingdom ====
In January 2019, the Iceland supermarket chain, which specializes in frozen foods, pledged to "eliminate or drastically reduce all plastic packaging for its store-brand products by 2023."

As of 2020, 104 communities achieved the title of "Plastic free community" in United Kingdom; 500 want to achieve it.

After two schoolgirls Ella and Caitlin launched a petition about it, Burger King and McDonald's in the United Kingdom and Ireland pledged to stop sending plastic toys with their meals. McDonald's pledged to do it from the year 2021. McDonald's also pledged to use a paper wrap for it meals and books that will be sent with the meals. The transmission will begin already in March 2020.

From October 2023 many types of single use plastic will be banned in England including cutlery and plates. Scotland and Wales have already implemented such bans. The new rules entered into force on the first of October, but many are unaware and not prepared for it.

==== United States ====
In the beginning of 2024, 12 states and at least 500 municipalities had some kind of plastic bag ban. Three state bans and two city bans alone reduced the amount of plastic bags used in one year approximately by 6 billion.

In 2009, Washington University in St. Louis became the first university in the United States to ban the sale of plastic, single-use water bottles.

In 2009, the District of Columbia required all businesses that sell food or alcohol to charge an additional 5 cents for each carryout plastic or paper bag.

In 2011 and 2013, Kauai, Maui and Hawaii prohibit non-biodegradable plastic bags at checkout as well as paper bags containing less than 40 percent recycled material. In 2015, Honolulu was the last major county approving the ban.

In 2015, California prohibited large stores from providing plastic bags, and if so a charge of $0.10 per bag and has to meet certain criteria.

In 2016, Illinois adopted the legislation and established "Recycle Thin Film Friday" in effort toe reclaim used thin-film plastic bags and encourage reusable bags.

In 2019, the state New York banned single use plastic bags and introduced a 5-cent fee for using single use paper bags. The ban will enter into force in 2020. This will not only reduce plastic bag usage in New York state (23 billion every year until now), but also eliminate 12 million barrels of oil used to make plastic bags used by the state each year.

The state of Maine ban Styrofoam (polystyrene) containers in May 2019.

In 2019 the Giant Eagle retailer became the first big US retailer that committed to completely phase out plastic by 2025. The first step – stop using single use plastic bags – will begun to be implemented already on January 15, 2020.

In 2019, Delaware, Maine, Oregon and Vermont enacted on legislation. Vermont also restricted single-use straws and polystyrene containers.

In 2019, Connecticut imposed a $0.10 charge on single-use plastic bags at point of sale, and is going to ban them on 1 July 2021.

==== Vanuatu ====
On 30 July 2017, Vanuatu's Independence Day, made an announcement of stepping towards the beginning of not using plastic bags and bottles. This made it one of the first Pacific nations to do so and will start banning the importation of single-use plastic bottles and bags.

== Obstruction by major plastic producers ==
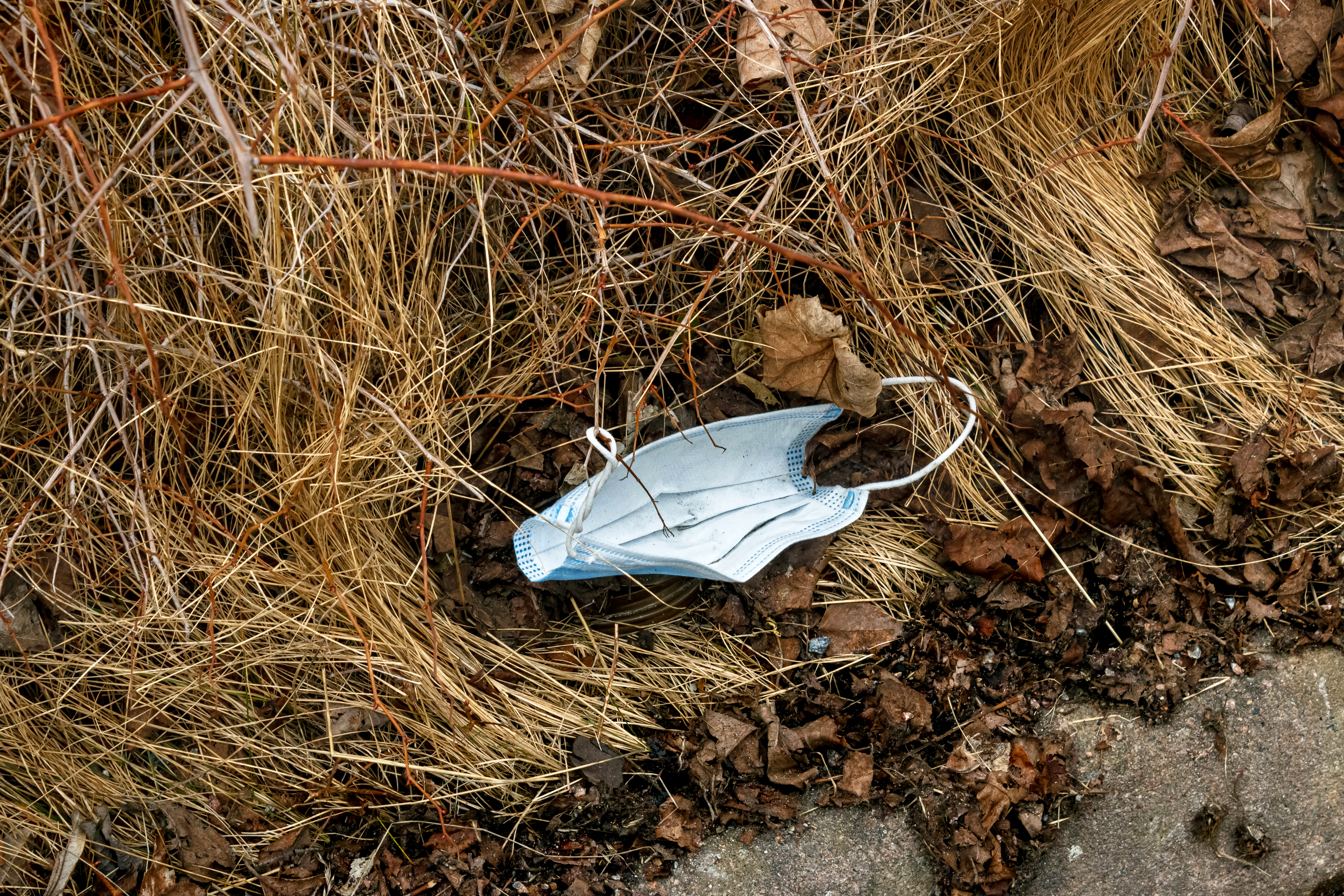
Surgical mask among dry grass in Brastad during the COVID-19 pandemic

The ten corporations that produce the most plastic on the planet, The Coca-Cola Company, Colgate-Palmolive, Danone, Mars, Incorporated, Mondelēz International, Nestlé, PepsiCo, Perfetti Van Melle, Procter & Gamble, and Unilever, formed a well-financed network that has sabotaged for decades government and community efforts to address the plastic pollution crisis, according to a detailed investigative report by the Changing Markets Foundation. The investigation documents how these companies delay and derail legislation so that they can continue to inundate consumers with disposable plastic packaging. These large plastic producers have exploited public fears of the COVID-19 pandemic to work toward delaying and reversing existing regulation of plastic disposal. Big ten plastic producers have advanced voluntary commitments for plastic waste disposal as a stratagem to deter governments from imposing additional regulations.

PepsiCo faced legal action on 15 November 2023, as the New York attorney general filed a lawsuit. The allegations asserted that the food and beverage giant jeopardized the environment and disseminated deceptive information about its dedication to reducing single-use plastic in packaging. Moreover, a substantial portion of the plastic pollution along the Buffalo River was linked to products manufactured by the company.

=== Deception of the public about recycling ===
As early as the early 1970s, petrochemical industry leaders understood that the vast majority of plastic they produced would never be recycled. For example, an April 1973 report written by industry scientists for industry executive states that sorting the hundreds of different kinds of plastic is "infeasible" and cost-prohibitive. By the late 1980s, industry leaders also knew that the public must be kept feeling good about purchasing plastic products if their industry was to continue to prosper, and needed to quell proposed legislation to regulate the plastic being sold. So the industry launched a $50 million/year corporate propaganda campaign targeting the American public with the message that plastic can be, and is being, recycled, and lobbied American municipalities to launch expensive plastic waste collection programs, and lobbied U.S. states to require the labeling of plastic products and containers with recycling symbols. They were confident, however, that the recycling initiatives would not end up recovering and reusing plastic in amounts anywhere near sufficient to hurt their profits in selling new "virgin" plastic products because they understood that the recycling efforts that they were promoting were likely to fail. Industry leaders more recently have planned 100% recycling of the plastic they produce by 2040, calling for more efficient collection, sorting and processing.

== Action for creating awareness ==
=== World Environment Day ===
Every year, 5 June is observed as World Environment Day to raise awareness and increase government action on the pressing issue. In 2018, India was host to the 43rd World Environment Day and the theme was "Beat Plastic Pollution", with a focus on single-use or disposable plastic. The Ministry of Environment, Forest, and Climate Change of India invited people to take care of their social responsibility and urged them to take up green good deeds in everyday life. Several states presented plans to ban plastic or drastically reduce their use.

=== Other actions ===
Since 2011, the community-led campaign, Plastic Free July, has encouraged people to refuse single-use plastics each July. Musician, and UNEP Good Will Ambassador, Jack Johnson has served as the campaign's international ambassador since 2018.

On 11 April 2013 in order to create awareness, artist Maria Cristina Finucci founded The Garbage Patch State at UNESCO headquarters in Paris, France, in front of Director General Irina Bokova. This was the first of a series of events under the patronage of UNESCO and of the Italian Ministry of the Environment.

The international #BYOBottle campaign was launched in 2019 in partnership with Jack Johnson, Green Music Australia and the Sustainable Concerts Working Group, encouraging musicians and venues worldwide to eliminate single-use plastic bottles at live events.

Mexico City implemented a ban on single-use plastics, starting with plastic bags in 2020 and expanding to items like utensils, straws, and to-go trays in 2021.

In 2020, China disclosed a three-part proposal to reduce plastic pollution. The plan includes a nationwide prohibition on single-use plastics, introduced as the country's plastic waste had risen to an anticipated 45 million tons in 2025, partly as a result of a surge in e-commerce packaging.

Multiple citizen science projects involve people from the public in plastic pollution research and have thereby contributed to collecting data about plastic pollution and raising awareness about this problem.

== See also ==
- Burning
- Eddy pumping – The role of mesoscale eddies in trapping and transporting plastic in the ocean
- Fiber optic drone
- Great Pacific Garbage Patch – an area with concentrations of pelagic plastics, chemical sludge, and other debris
- Plastic-eating organisms
- Marine plastic pollution
- Microplastic remediation
- Plasticulture
- Refill (scheme)
- Reverse vending machine
- Rubber pollution
- Nuclear waste
- Technofossil
