= Oxo-degradation =

Degradation process

Oxo-degradation is the breakdown of plastics accelerated by metal-containing additives that degrade the polymeric matrix. These plastics contrast biodegradable or compostable plastics, which decompose at the molecular or polymer level. Oxo-degradable plastics are banned in the EU, though they are permitted in other jurisdictions, such as the UK.

Oxo-degradable plastics are intended to fragment if they are introduced into the open environment as litter and should not be confused with plastics intended to biodegrade in the special conditions found in an industrial composting unit—these compostable plastics use an entirely different technology.

== Applications ==
Oxo-degradable plastic packaging has been promoted as a potential solution to plastic pollution, with claims that it can degrade over time. However, questions have been raised regarding its actual performance and environmental impact. Some studies suggest that instead of fully biodegrading, oxo-degradable plastics tend to fragment into smaller pieces, including microplastics, which can persist in the environment. These microplastics may take longer to degrade than initially anticipated, depending on environmental conditions.

From a reuse and recycling perspective, oxo-degradable plastics are generally not considered suitable for long-term applications. They are designed to break down over time, making them less suitable for reuse. In addition, recyclers have expressed concerns that oxo-degradable plastics may reduce the quality and value of recycled materials. They are also difficult to detect and sort out in recycling streams, presenting challenges for recycling at scale.

Oxo-degradable plastics typically do not meet the requirements of international composting standards, as their degradation process is slower than required, and plastic fragments can remain in the compost, which has led to concerns about their compatibility with composting systems and their potential to affect compost quality.

== Regulation ==
Since 2017, there has been a move towards regulating or banning the use of oxo-degradable plastics, when the Ellen MacArthur Foundation published a statement supported by more than 150 organizations calling for a ban.

=== European Union ===
Effective July 2021, oxo-degradable plastics have been banned in the EU with Directive 2019/904 (also known as the Single-Use Plastics Directive). Oxo-degradable plastics were particularly targeted. The rationale behind this focus was that they often do not break down completely but instead fragment into microplastics, which persist in the environment and contribute to pollution.

In December 2020, Symphony Environmental Technologies filed a lawsuit against the European Commission, arguing that the prohibition was arbitrary and unlawful. In January 2024, the European Court of Justice dismissed the suit, ruling that none of the commission's actions had been improper.

=== Switzerland ===
As of April 2022, Switzerland banned oxo-degradable plastics, bringing their rules in line with those of the EU.

=== United States ===
Although oxo-degradable plastics are not illegal in the US, the Federal Trade Commission (FTC) has taken the stance that they cannot be called "degradable" or "biodegradable" without strong scientific evidence. In 2014, the FTC advised 14 firms to either remove their oxo-degradable claims or provide reliable scientific evidence.

=== United Kingdom ===
In 2022, Scotland put forward a proposal contemplating a ban on oxo-degradable plastics.

=== New Zealand ===
In October 2022, a comprehensive bill banning single-use plastics also banned plastics with pro-degradant additives, such as oxo- and photodegradable plastics.

=== Canada ===
As of July 2024, British Columbia businesses can no longer sell or distribute any packaging or single-use disposable products that contain oxo-degradable plastics.

=== Australia ===
Oxo-degradable plastics were banned in South Australia in March 2022 and Western Australia in September 2023.

=== China ===
Hong Kong banned the manufacture of oxo-degradable plastics as of April 2024.
