= Directive (EU) 2019/904 (Single-Use Plastics Directive) =

Directive (EU) 2019/904 of the European Parliament and of the Council of 5 June 2019 on the reduction of the impact of certain plastic products on the environment (known as the Single-Use Plastics Directive) is a European directive that aims to prevent and reduce the impact of certain plastic products on the environment, in particular the marine environment and human health, and to promote the transition to a circular economy with innovative and sustainable business models, articles and materials.

This was preceded in 2015 by the Action Plan for the Circular Economy and in 2018 by the Strategy for Plastics in the Circular Economy.

== Contents ==
The Directive requires the Member States of the European Union in particular to restrict the placing on the market (Art. 5), to ensure certain product requirements (Art. 6), to label certain plastic articles (Art. 7) and to extend producer responsibility within the meaning of the Waste Framework Directive (Art. 8). National regulations should provide for penalties in the event of non-compliance (Art. 14).

The individual measures are to take effect at different times (Art. 17).

In the event of a conflict, the Single-Use Plastics Directive takes precedence as lex specialis over Directive 94/62/EC (Packaging Directive) and Directive 2008/98/EC (Waste Framework Directive).

=== Sales ban ===
Since 3 July 2021, Member States must prohibit the supply, for a certain or no monetary value, of single-use plastic items listed in Part B of the Annex to the Directive and of items made of oxo-degradable plastic. In addition to cotton buds, cutlery and plates, this also includes food packaging and beverage containers made of expanded polystyrene for takeaway meals and fast food. Oxo-degradable plastics are not considered biodegradable and break down into microplastics in the environment.

=== Product requirements ===
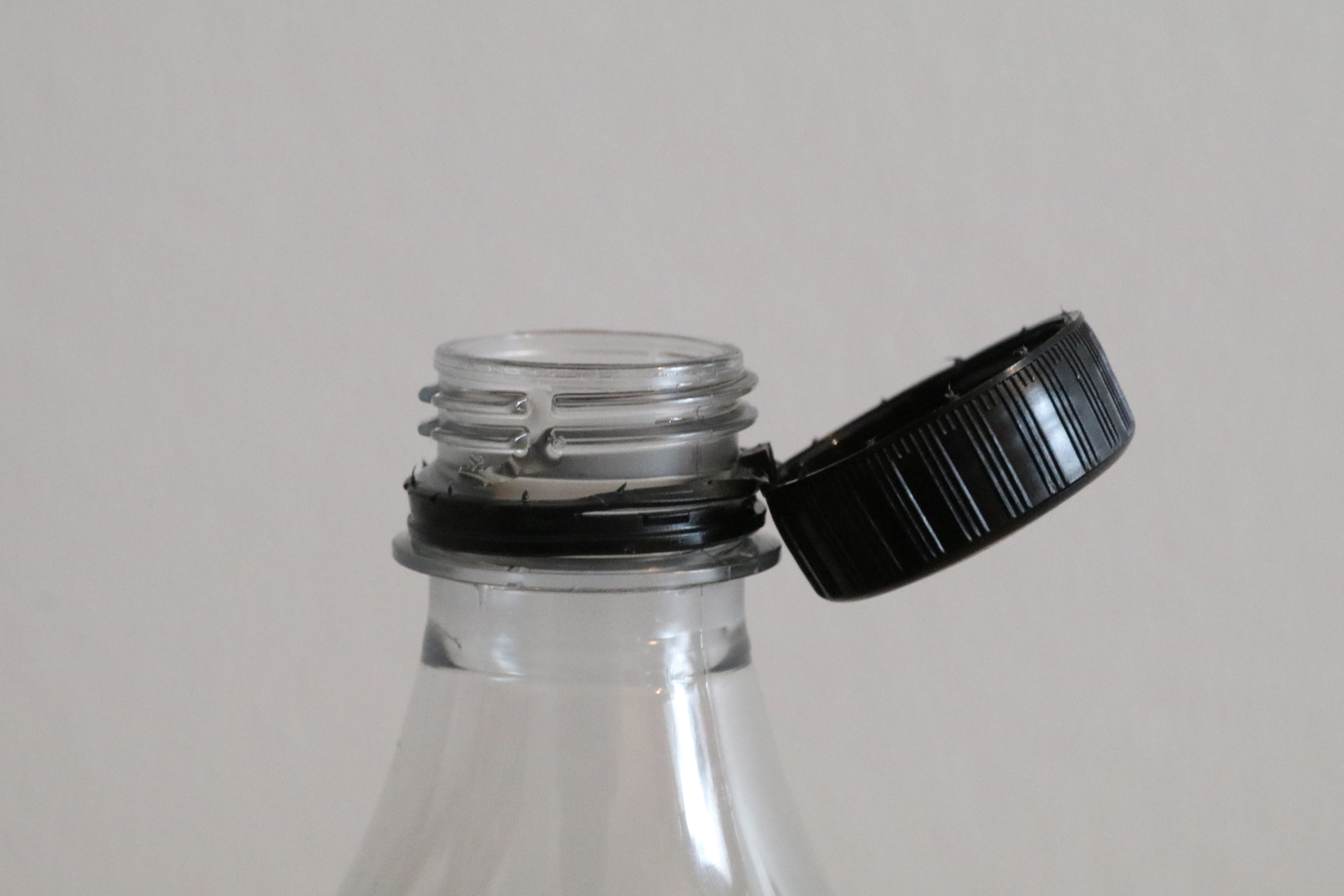
Tethered cap on a plastic bottle

Single-use plastic items listed in Part C of the Annex, in particular beverage containers with a capacity of up to three litres, whose caps and lids are made of plastic, may only be placed on the market from 3 July 2024 in accordance with Art. 6 if the caps and lids remain attached to the containers during the intended use of the product (see Tethered caps). Uniform EU-wide standards are intended in particular to ensure that the necessary strength, reliability and safety of closures for beverage containers, including closures for carbonated beverages, are maintained. To ensure uniform technical implementation, the European Commission has tasked the European Committee for Standardisation (CEN) in accordance with Art. 6(3) with developing a corresponding standard by 31 December 2022.

PET bottles must consist of at least 25% recycled plastic from 2025 and at least 30% from 2030.

=== Labelling requirement ===
Labelling in accordance with Annex III of Implementing Regulation (EU) 2020/2151 for tobacco products with filters in German

Single-use plastic items listed in Part D of the Annex and placed on the market, such as sanitary pads and wet wipes, tobacco products and beverage cups must be labelled with consumer information on appropriate disposal options and warnings about the negative environmental impact of improper disposal in accordance with harmonised requirements established by the European Commission. The harmonised requirements have been laid down by the EU Commission in Implementing Regulation (EU) 2020/2151; they mainly concern the design, size and position of imprints with which packaging of the products concerned or beverage cups must be labelled.

=== Extended producer responsibility ===
By 31 December 2024 at the latest, but for extended producer responsibility schemes established before 4 July 2018 and for single-use plastic items in accordance with Part E, Section III of the Annex, by 5 January 2023 at the latest, manufacturers will be obliged to bear the costs of take-back (collection in public collection systems) and disposal of single-use plastic items.

== Transposition into national law ==
=== Germany ===
In Germany, Article 5 of the Directive was transposed on 3 July 2021 with the Einwegkunststoffverbotsverordnung (Single-Use Plastics Ban Ordinance, EWKVerbotsV). The single-use plastic products and products made of oxo-degradable plastic listed in Section 3 EWKVerbotsV may no longer be placed on the market since then. Violations constitute an administrative offence and can be punished with a fine of up to €100,000 (Section 4 EWKVerbotsV, Section 69 (1) No. 8, (3) KrWG).

The Einwegkunststoffkennzeichnungsverordnung (Single-Use Plastic Labelling Regulation, EWKKennzV), which also entered into force on 3 July 2021, serves to implement Articles 6 and 7 of the Directive. It regulates the properties of certain single-use plastic beverage containers and the labelling of certain single-use plastic products on the product itself or on the associated packaging (Section 1 EWKKennzV).

Article 8, which covers extended producer responsibility, is implemented in Germany by the Single-Use Plastics Fund Act (EWKFondsG). Manufacturers must pay a special levy, the single-use plastic levy, calculated according to the quantity and type of plastic products, into a single-use plastic fund. The fund is used to reimburse cities and municipalities for costs incurred, particularly for waste disposal and cleaning. In order to apply for funds from this fund, municipalities must register with the single-use plastic platform DIVID. The amount of the levy and the payment criteria are specified in more detail in the Single-Use Plastics Fund Ordinance (EWKFondsV).

=== Austria ===
In Austria, implementation occurred through an amendment to the Waste Management Act 2002 and the Packaging Ordinance 2014.

== Effectiveness of the directive ==
One study, published in 2023, relying on data from multiple citizen science programs estimated that litter in the environment in the European Union could be reduced by 6% or upwards of 40%, depending on how measures of the directive would be transposed into national law.

This transposition happened differently, with some member states (among them France) choosing to add additional, more ambitious measures to address plastic pollution through the directive.

In Germany, consumer organizations found that banned plastic articles such as plastic cutlery and plates were still available to consumers through online shopping, often being relabeled as "multi-use" items. Many fast food places also still offered banned single-use plastic items years after the ban was enacted.

In Croatia, one study found that opinion of consumers about lids attached to bottles is low, with only approximately a quarter of respondents having a positive opinion. Reasons ranged from practical implications to concerns about the impact of this measure on the environment.

A study interviewing business representatives showed that the directive was effective in changing business practices due to its multifaceted nature (meaning that it included various measures within one legislative instrument), which also illustrated to companies the long-term mission of the European Union to support more sustainable business practices. The same study showed that some companies also circumvented measures by the directive, for example by modifying or relabeling single-use plastics, therefore not complying with this legislation.
