= Collegium Ramazzini =

International academy for occupational and environmental health

The Collegium Ramazzini is an independent, international academy composed of physicians, scientists, and scholars from 40 countries. Through its members and activities, it seeks to advance occupational and environmental health by bridging scientific knowledge with socio-political centers that have the responsibility to protect public health. The organization is named after physician Bernardino Ramazzini (1633–1714), known as "the father of occupational medicine."

The Collegium Ramazzini is governed by an elected executive council composed of a president, secretary general, treasurer, and six other fellows. Four individuals have served as the academy's president: Irving Selikoff (1982–1992); Eula Bingham (1993–1997); Philip J. Landrigan (1998–2021); and Melissa McDiarmid (2022 to present). The organization's by-laws allow for 180 active fellows with an unlimited number of emeritus fellows.

== History ==
Cesare Maltoni and Irving J. Selikoff founded the Collegium Ramazzini in 1982. Their goal was an organization of physicians and researchers with expertise in the present and emerging risks associated with exposures to health hazards in workplaces and the environment. Maltoni's research on the carcinogenesis of vinyl chloride, benzene, and other chemicals, and Selikoff's on the health effects of exposure to asbestos, motivated their vision of a precautionary approach to the use of industrial chemicals.

Maltoni and Selikoff sought input from Morris Greenberg, Myron Mehlman, and Sheldon Samuels to recommend individuals to be members of the Collegium Ramazzini. Sixty four physicians and scientists from 16 countries composed the inaugural class of fellows.

Selikoff and Maltoni served as the organization's first president and secretary general, respectively.

In 1983, the Collegium held its first meeting of fellows along with an international conference on the health effects of benzene. Speakers included Maltoni, Mehlman, Maths Berlin and Marvin S. Legator; future fellows Bo Holmberg, (National Board of Occupational Safety and Health, Sweden) and Peter Infante (Occupational Safety and Health Administration, US); as well as other scientists from academia, governments, and petrochemical companies. Papers from the conference were published in a 1985 edition of the American Journal of Industrial Medicine.

== Activities ==
The Collegium Ramazzini holds an annual scientific meeting in October that is called "Ramazzini Days." It is an opportunity for fellows to present new research and discuss emerging issues in the context of the current socio-political environment. The meeting, which is open to the public, is held in the Castello dei Pio in the city of Carpi, Italy, which is the hometown of Bernardino Ramazzini.

Beginning in 2006, the agendas for the scientific program have been published on-line and abstracts available since 2020.

The Collegium Ramazzini publishes policy statements on pressing environmental and occupational health issues.

The statements describe the scientific evidence of harm and the need for policy action by nations and the global community. Since 1984, the Collegium has published 28 policy statements addressing topics such as asbestos, endocrine disruptors, COVID-19, and scientific integrity.

The collegium issued a statement criticizing the unilateral removal of Dr. Daniele Mandrioli who worked at the Cesare Maltoni Cancer Research Center of the Ramazinni Institute as Director citing the removal was due to chemical industry pressure.

== Awards ==
The Collegium Ramazzini bestows several awards to recognize an individual's achievement and service to advance knowledge and protection of occupational and environmental health. The Ramazzini Award is bestowed to a "scientists deemed by the Collegium to have made outstanding contributions to furthering the aims of Bernardino Ramazzini in safeguarding public health". The awardees to-date have been:

- 2022: Morando Soffritti (Italy)
- 2021: Linda Birnbaum (US)
- 2020: (No award due to COVID-19 pandemic)
- 2019: Richard Lemen (US)
- 2018: Fernanda Giannasi (Brazil)
- 2017: Karel Van Damme (Belgium)
- 2016: Arthur L. Frank (US)
- 2015: Philippe Grandjean (Denmark)
- 2014: Benedetto Terracini
- 2013: John R. Froines (US)
- 2012: Sheldon W. Samuels (US)
- 2011: Morris Greenberg (UK)
- 2010: Marja Sorsa (Finland)
- 2009: Her Royal Highness Princess Chulabhorn Mahidol of Thailand
- 2008: Massimo Crespi (Italy)
- 2007: Fiorella Belpoggi (Italy)
- 2006: Anders Englund (Sweden)
- 2005: Lorenzo Tomatis (Italy)
- 2004: Herbert L. Needleman (US)
- 2003: Olav Axelson (Sweden)
- 2002: Myron A. Mehlman (US)
- 2000: Eula Bingham (US)
- 1998: Joseph Ladou (US)
- 1997: Samuel Milham (US)
- 1996: John C. Bailar III (US)
- 1995: Cesare Maltoni (Italy)
- 1994: David G. Hoel (US)
- 1993: Yasunosuke Suzuki (US)
- 1992: Luigi Giarelli (Italy)
- 1991: Alice M. Stewart (UK) and Friedrich Pott (Germany)
- 1990: Lars Ehrenberg (Sweden)
- 1989: David P. Rall (US)
- 1988: Johannes Clemmesen (Denmark)
- 1987: Dietrich F.K. Schmahl (Germany)
- 1986: Arthur C. Upton (US)
- 1985: Alberto Bisetti (Italy)
- 1984: Muzaffer Aksoy (Turkey) and Enrico C. Vigliani (Italy)

The Irving J. Selikoff Award and Lecture is given to "an internationally recognized scientist or humanist whose studies and achievements have contributed to the protection of workers' health and the environment". Awardees to date have been:

- 2016 - Richard Lemen
- 2009 - Stephen M. Levin
- 2008 - Philip J. Landrigan
- 2007 - Morando Soffritti
- 2006 - Yasunosuke Suzuki
- 1995 - Cesare Maltoni

== Publications ==
The Collegium Ramazzani has functioned as an initial publication source for some scientific papers later re-published in additional peer reviewed journals. The Collegium Ramazzani has also published editorials through its presidents and collectively in peer-reviewed scientific journals including calls for an international ban on asbestos in 1999, 2005, 2010 and 2012; the war in Darfur; and control of pesticide use in the European Union.
