= Gwen W. Collman =

American environmental epidemiologist

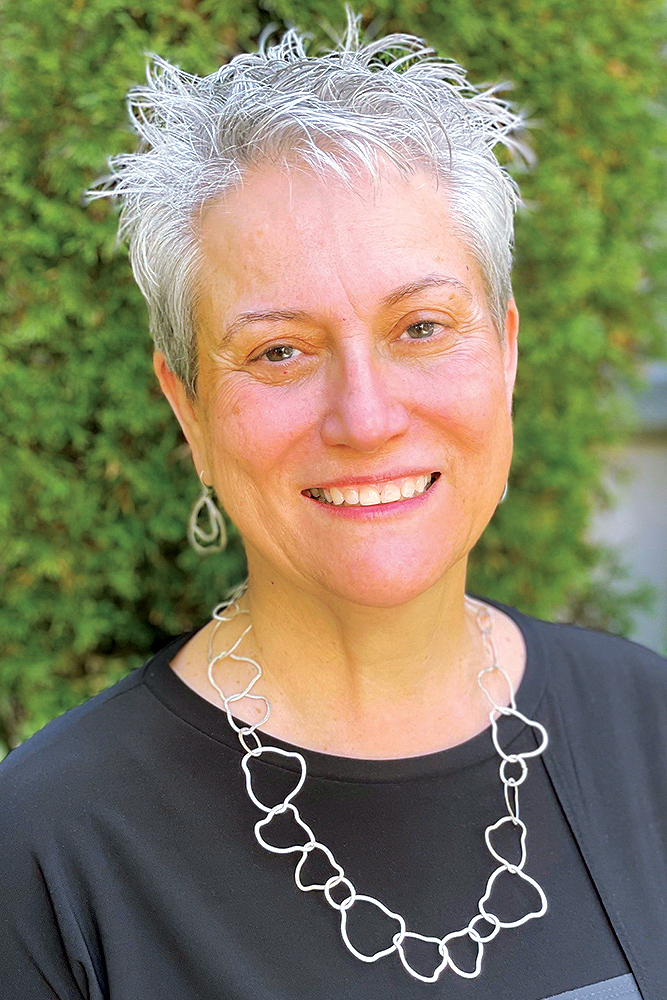
- Collman in 2023
- Education: UNC Gillings School of Global Public Health
- Scientific career
- Fields: Environmental epidemiology
- Workplaces: National Institute of Environmental Health Sciences

Gwen W. Collman is an American environmental epidemiologist. Collman is acting deputy director of the National Institute of Environmental Health Sciences and works as director of the division of extramural research and training.

== Life ==
Collman received a Ph.D. in Environmental Epidemiology from the UNC Gillings School of Global Public Health in 1984.

Collman joined National Institute of Environmental Health Sciences (NIEHS) in 1984 in the epidemiology branch. In 1992, she became a program administrator in NIEHS Division of Extramural Research and Training (DERT). In 2003, Collman became chief of DERT’s Susceptibility and Population Health Branch, a post she held until being named acting director of the division in 2008. She is credited with building the NIEHS grant portfolio in environmental and molecular epidemiology, and she developed several complex multidisciplinary research programs. These included the NIEHS Breast Cancer and the Environment Research Centers Program, the NIEHS/EPA Centers for Children's Environmental Health and Disease Prevention, and the Genes, Environment and Health Initiative. Under her guidance, a team created a vision for the Partnerships for Environmental Public Health programs for the next decade.

In 2011, Collman was appointed by Linda Birnbaum as director of DERT. Collman led the implementation of many scientific programs with partners from other NIH institutes and centers and U.S. Federal agencies. These include the CHEAR/HHEAR exposure resource, Time Sensitive Research Awards, the Gulf Oil, PRIME mixtures, Nanotechnology, and TARGET Consortia, and Telomeres Network to name a few. Collman was involved in creating and promoted the Translational Research Framework and it’s uptake by the many multidisciplinary Centers NIEHS supports to the highlight impact of NIEHS supported research.

As acting deputy director of NIEHS, Gwen Collman, assists NIEHS and the National Toxicology Program Director, Rick Woychik, in the formulation and implementation of plans and policies necessary to carry out NIEHS missions. Collman works with Woychik in the administrative management of NIEHS, and speaks on behalf of the institute as appropriate. She became director of the NIEHS Office of Scientific Coordination, Planning and Evaluation (SCOPE) in 2022.
