= Kenneth Olden =

American scientist

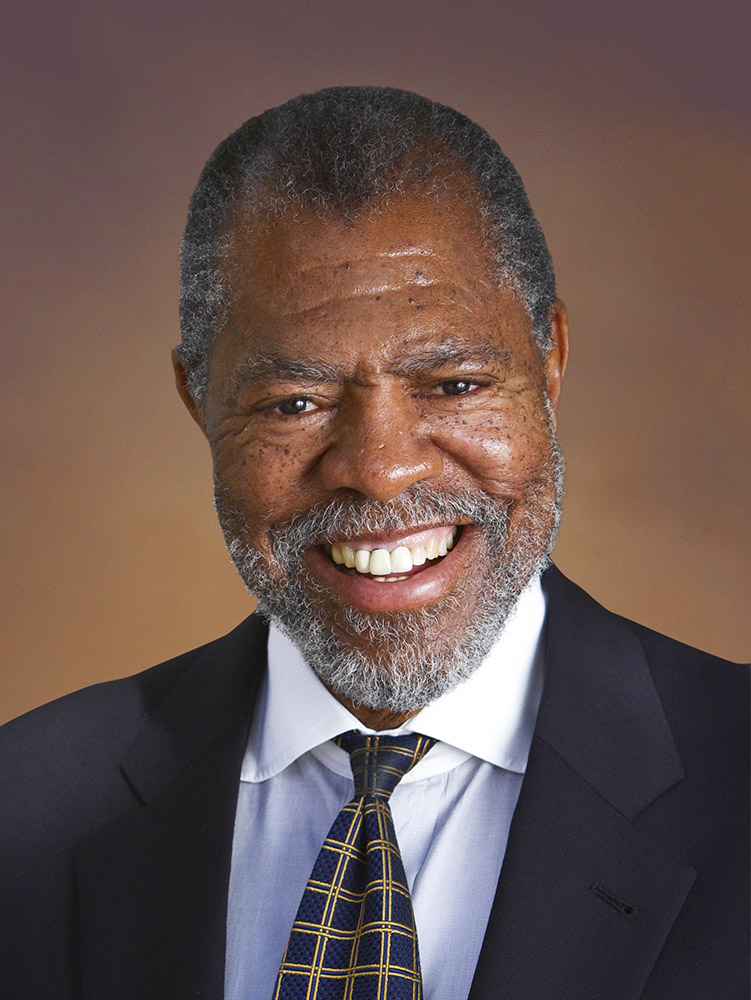

Director of National Institute of Environmental Health Sciences
- In office 1991–2005
- Preceded by: David Rall
- Succeeded by: David A. Schwartz

Personal details
- Born: July 22, 1938 (age 88) Parrottsville, Tennessee, U.S.
- Education: Knoxville College, (BS); University of Michigan (MS); Temple University (PhD)

Kenneth Olden is a scientist whose research revolves around diseases, such as cancers, and how chemicals and environmental factors affect them. He was director of the National Institute of Environmental Health Sciences (NIEHS) and National Toxicology Program, being the first African-American to head an National Institutes of Health (NIH) institute, a position he held from 1991 to 2005. He was also the director of the Environmental Protection Agency (EPA) and overseer of the Integrated Risk Information System (IRIS). He is a scientist who expressed that socioeconomic factors are related to cancer survival rates and need to be given more attention in scientific research. He has made multiple discoveries in the field, such as finding that the sweetener saccharin is not a chemical that causes cancer and funding research on the effects of bus exhaust on minority children in low-income housing residing in New York City. He faced controversy from multiple organizations over slow assessments during his time overseeing IRIS. He is currently 88 years old.

== Early life ==
Kenneth Olden was born in Parrottsville, Tennessee, on July 22, 1938. He attended Tanner High School, a segregated school and was inspired by the school's principal to attend college. He graduated from Tanner in 1956, and he worked hard shining shoes in order to pay tuition and get into Knoxville College. He graduated in 1960 with a B.S. in biology and a minor in chemistry, and moved on to University of Michigan for a genetics program. He later would receive a M.S. in 1964, and then in 1970 receive a doctorate in cell biology and biochemistry from Temple University.

== Career ==
Olden joined the National Cancer Institute in its cancer biology division as a senior staff fellow in 1974. He was awarded tenure in 1977 and became the first African-American to be named an independent investigator in the cancer institute. He later became chairman of Howard University's oncology department in 1985, where he focused his work on studying cancers that were prevalent in people of color.

In 1991, Olden became the director of the National Institute of Environmental Health Sciences and National Toxicology Program, being the first African-American to head an NIH institute. During his 14 years as director, the NIEHS made many research contributions on health problems such cancer and birth defects. Olden was elected to the Institute of Medicine of the National Academy of Sciences for his discovery that blocking interaction between fibronectin and the integrin receptor can prevent organ-specific metastasis of malignant cells. Olden and his team also removed saccharin from causes of human cancer.

In July 2012, Olden became director of the National Center for Environmental Assessment, and began to oversee its Integrated Risk Information System. During that time, he and IRIS were criticized for their sluggish pace of assessments by environmental groups, congress and industry. This was mostly due to Olden asking for more input from the chemical industry, delaying the bans on chemicals.

== Awards ==
Olden received the Toxicology Forum's Distinguished Fellow Award, the United States Secretary of Health and Human Services's Distinguished Service Award, the American College of Toxicology's First Distinguished Service Award, and the National Minority Health Leadership Award. Former President Bill Clinton also gave him the Presidential Distinguished Executive Rank Award and the Presidential Meritorious Executive Rank Award. Olden also received the Calver Award in 2002, the Sedgwick Medal in 2004, and the Julius B. Richmond Award in 2005.
