= Elisabete Weiderpass =

Brazilian cancer researcher

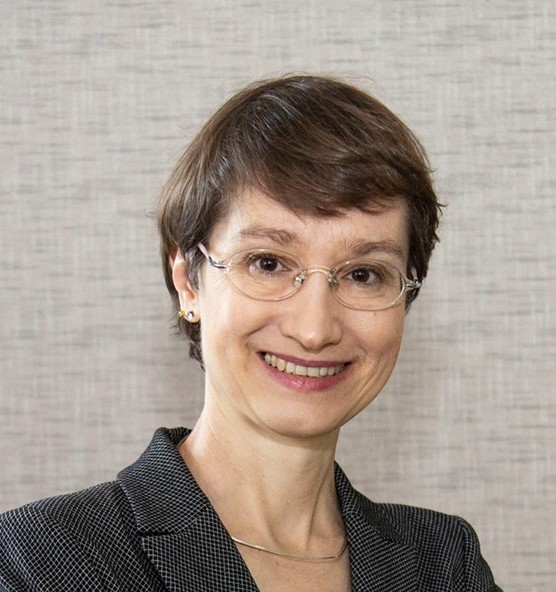
- Born: 1965 or 1966 (age 59–60)
- Education: Federal University of Pelotas; Karolinska Institute
- Scientific career
- Workplaces: International Agency for Research on Cancer; Karolinska Institute; Yale School of Public Health
- Thesis: Some hormonal factors in the etiology of endometrial cancer (1999)

Elisabete Weiderpass-Vainio is a Brazilian cancer researcher who is Director of the International Agency for Research on Cancer, a part of the World Health Organization. Her research considers the epidemiology and prevention of cancer.

== Early life and education ==
Weiderpass is from Santo André, São Paulo. In an interview with The Lancet she explained that she grew up in a working-class family, and that it was unclear whether or not she would attend university. Her parents encouraged her to continue her studies, and she was approved to study medicine at the Federal University of Pelotas in south Brazil. During her undergraduate degree, Weiderpass became increasingly interested in epidemiology and public health. She remained at the Federal University of Pelotas for her graduate studies, where she completed a master's degree in epidemiology. Weiderpass moved to the Karolinska Institute for her doctoral studies, where she studied the aetiology of endometrial cancer.

== Research and career ==
In the early 2000s, Weiderpass started to work in Sub-Saharan Africa with the International Agency for Research on Cancer. These experiences inspired a career focused on reducing inequalities in cancer diagnosis and treatment. She developed and delivered training programmes for African medical doctors and researchers. Her students included Jackson Orem, who went on to become Director of the Uganda Cancer Institute. In 2005, she returned to the Karolinska Institute, where she continued to study the epidemiology of cancer. Her research considers women's health, with a particular focus on identifying risk factors for certain forms of cancer. She was responsible for the Ugandan Collaboration of Infectious Diseases. Weiderpass found several lifestyle risk factors, such as tobacco use, diet and obesity, can have a marked impact on a person's likelihood to suffer from cancer.

In 2007, Weiderpass was made Head of the Genetic Epidemiology Group at the Folkhälsan Research Center in Helsinki, where she spent over ten years. At the same time, she oversaw the Cancer Registry of Norway, which is located in the Institute of Population-based Cancer Research in Oslo, as well as at the University of Tromsø and Yale School of Medicine.

Weiderpass was elected Director of the International Agency for Research on Cancer in 2019. The agency is based in Lyon. Weiderpass is the first woman to hold the position. In 2020, she launched the World Cancer Report, which provides an overview of current cancer research and information on strategies for cancer prevention. She partnered with the European Society for Medical Oncology in 2020, working together to deliver a series of webinars and e-learning modules focussed on the elimination of cancer.

== Awards and honours ==
- 2017 Elected Fellow of the European Academy of Cancer Sciences
- 2017 Gansu Foreign Experts Administration Dunhuang Award for Outstanding Foreign Expert
- 2023 Recognized as one of the 100 Influential Women in Oncology by OncoDaily

== Select publications ==
- Roger VL; Go AS; Lloyd-Jones DM; et al. (3 January 2012). "Heart disease and stroke statistics--2012 update: a report from the American Heart Association". Circulation. 125 (1): e2–e220. doi:10.1161/cir.0b013e31823ac046. ISSN 0009-7322. PMC 4440543. PMID 22179539. Wikidata Q29547909.
- Marie Ng; Tom Fleming; Margaret Robinson; et al. (30 August 2014). "Global, regional, and national prevalence of overweight and obesity in children and adults during 1980-2013: a systematic analysis for the Global Burden of Disease Study 2013". The Lancet. 384 (9945): 766–781. doi:10.1016/s0140-6736(14)60460-8. ISSN 0140-6736. PMC 4624264. PMID 24880830. Wikidata Q29616834.
- Mohammad H Forouzanfar; Ashkan Afshin; Lily T Alexander; et al. (1 October 2016). "Global, regional, and national comparative risk assessment of 79 behavioural, environmental and occupational, and metabolic risks or clusters of risks, 1990-2015: a systematic analysis for the Global Burden of Disease Study 2015". The Lancet. 388 (10053): 1659–1724. doi:10.1016/s0140-6736(16)31679-8. ISSN 0140-6736. PMC 5388856. PMID 27733284. S2CID 13770184. Wikidata Q30353195.

== Personal life ==
Weiderpass is a naturalised Swedish and Finnish citizen. She is married to Harri Uolevi Vainio, a professor at Kuwait University.
