= International Agency for Research on Cancer =

Intergovernmental agency

Coordinates: 45.7435°N 4.8761°E

International Agency for Research on Cancer / Centre international de recherche sur le cancer
- Abbreviation: IARC, CIRC
- Formation: 20 May 1965; 61 years ago
- Type: Agency
- Legal status: Active
- Headquarters: Lyon, France
- Head: Elisabete Weiderpass (director)
- Parent organization: World Health Organization
- Website: www.iarc.who.int

The International Agency for Research on Cancer (IARC; French: Centre International de Recherche sur le Cancer, CIRC) is an intergovernmental agency forming part of the World Health Organization of the United Nations. Its role is to conduct and coordinate research into the causes of cancer. It also collects and publishes surveillance data regarding the occurrence of cancer worldwide.

Its IARC monographs programme identifies carcinogenic hazards and evaluates environmental causes of cancer in humans.

IARC has its own governing council, and in 1965 the first members were West Germany, France, Italy, the United Kingdom, and the United States of America. Today, IARC's membership has grown to 29 countries.

== History ==
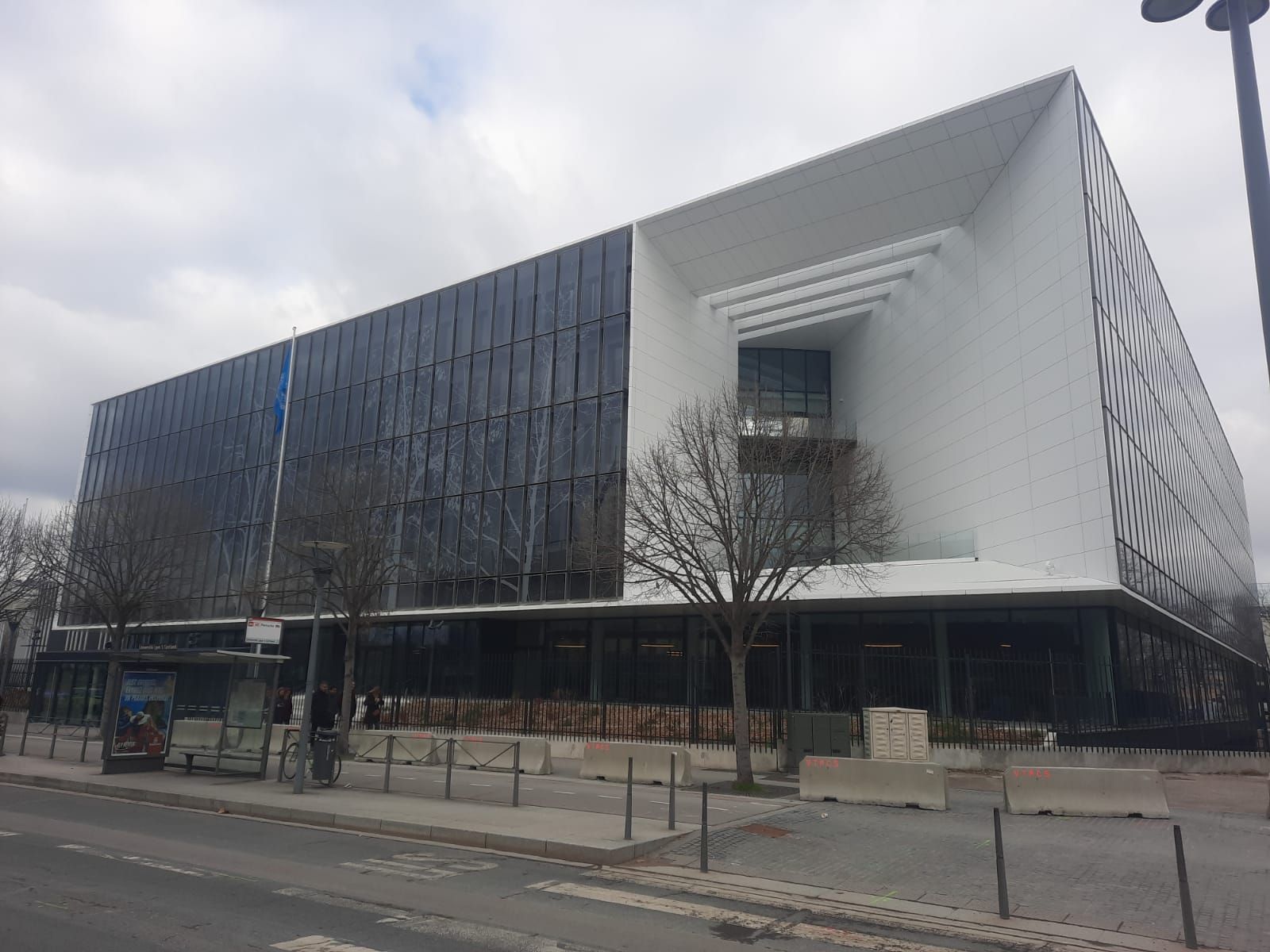
Exterior of the main building of the headquarters for the International Agency of Research on Cancer

In late February 1963, after he experienced his spouse suffering and dying of cancer, journalist and peace activist Yves Poggioli sent a letter to Emmanuel d'Astier de la Vignerie relating his story, and urging support for the creation of an international center to fight against cancer, whose funding was to be directly debited from the national budgets allocated to nuclear weaponry. Touched by the letter, d'Astier assembled a group of French prominent figures, among which Pierre Auger, Francis Perrin, Jean Hyppolite, François Perroux, Pierre Massé, Louis Armand, François Bloch-Lainé, Jean Rostand, François Mauriac, Antoine Lacassagne, Ambroise-Marie Carré and Le Corbusier, to reach for French president Charles de Gaulle in national newspaper Le Monde on 8 November 1963. de Gaulle answered positively to the call and reached for the World Health Organization director Marcolino Gomes Candau on 11 November. The project rapidly gained momentum, and IARC was created on 20 May 1965, by a resolution of the World Health Assembly, as the specialized cancer agency of the World Health Organization. The Agency's headquarters building was provided by its host in Lyon, France.

The first IARC Director was John Higginson (1966–1981), who was followed by Lorenzo Tomatis (1982–1993), Paul Kleihues (1994–2003), Peter Boyle (2004–2008), Christopher Wild (2009–2018) and Elisabete Weiderpass (2019–present).

== Monographs ==
In 1970, after IARC received numerous requests for lists of known and suspected human carcinogens, its advisory committee recommended that expert groups prepare a compendium on carcinogenic chemicals, which began publishing the IARC Monographs series with this aim in mind.

IARC identifies carcinogenic hazards based on qualitative assessment of animal and human evidence. The IARC Working Groups classify agents, mixtures and exposures into one of five categories. The categorization is a matter of scientific judgement that reflects the strength of evidence derived from studies in humans, experimental animals and other relevant data. The classification is based only on the strength of evidence for carcinogenicity, not on the relative increase of cancer risk due to exposure, or on the amount of agent exposure necessary to cause cancer.

- Group 1: The agent is carcinogenic to humans.

There is sufficient evidence of carcinogenicity in humans. The determination is usually based on epidemiological studies on humans, but can also be based on sufficient evidence in experimental animals and strong evidence in exposed humans that the agent acts through a relevant mechanism of carcinogenicity. Examples of agents classified as Group 1 include tobacco smoke, alcoholic beverages, Chinese-style salted fish and consumption of processed meat.

- Group 2A: The agent is probably carcinogenic to humans.

There is limited evidence of carcinogenicity in humans and sufficient evidence in experimental animals. Occasionally, an agent (or mixture) may be classified here when there is inadequate evidence in humans but sufficient evidence in experimental animals and strong evidence that the carcinogenesis is mediated by a mechanism that also operates in humans. Exceptionally, an agent (or mixture) may solely be classified under this category if there is limited evidence of carcinogenicity in humans, but if it clearly belongs to this category based on mechanistic considerations. Examples of agents classified as Group 2A include emissions from high-temperature frying of food, the occupational exposures as a hairdresser or barber, consumption of red meat and night shift work.

- Group 2B: The agent is possibly carcinogenic to humans.

There is limited evidence of carcinogenicity in humans and less than sufficient evidence in experimental animals. It may also be used if there is inadequate evidence in humans but sufficient evidence in experimental animals. Occasionally, an agent (or mixture) may be placed in group 2B if there is inadequate evidence in humans and less than sufficient evidence in experimental animals but there is supporting evidence of carcinogenicity from mechanistic and other relevant data. An agent or a mixture may also be classified in this category solely on the basis of strong evidence of carcinogenicity from mechanistic and other relevant data. Examples of agents classified as Group 2B include occupational exposures in working in the textile manufacturing industry, printing processes, traditional Asian pickled vegetables, and radiofrequency electromagnetic fields.

- Group 3: The agent is not classifiable as to its carcinogenicity to humans.

The evidence is inadequate in humans and inadequate or limited in experimental animals. Exceptionally, agents (or mixtures) where evidence is inadequate in humans but sufficient in experimental animals may be placed in this category only if there is strong evidence that the mechanism of carcinogenicity in experimental animals does not operate in humans.

Substances that do not fall into any other group are placed in this category. This is not a determination of non-carcinogenicity or overall safety. It means that further research is needed, especially when exposures are widespread or the cancer data are consistent with differing interpretations.

As of August 2019, roughly 50% of all substances analyzed by IARC fall into this category.

- Group 4 (retired): The agent is probably not carcinogenic to humans.

There is evidence suggesting lack of carcinogenicity in humans and in experimental animals. In some instances, agents or mixtures for which there is inadequate evidence in humans but evidence suggesting lack of carcinogenicity in experimental animals, consistently and strongly supported by a broad range of mechanistic and other relevant data may be classified group 4. As of 2018, only caprolactam falls under this category. In 2019, this group has been retired as part of an update to the program and it is no longer used as a IARC monograph.

== Controversies ==
=== Transparency (1998–2004) ===
Lorenzo Tomatis, IARC director from 1982 to 1993, was allegedly "barred from entering the building" in 2003 after "accusing the IARC of softpedaling the risks of industrial chemicals" in a 2002 article. In 2003 thirty public-health scientists signed a letter targeting conflicts of interest and the lack of transparency. Tomatis accused the IARC of "highly irregular" voting procedures, alleging industrial interferences, and called for the agency to publish voting procedures and names in details for independent scrutiny.

The IARC rejected these criticisms, highlighting that only 17 of 410 of the working-group participants were consultants to industry and these people never served as chairs, nor were allowed to vote. The reason the details of the voting names were not published was to avoid political pressures on the participating Working Group scientists, and to protect the integrity of the deliberative process.

=== Glyphosate and methodology concerns (2015–2018) ===
On 20 March 2015, IARC classified glyphosate, the most widely used weed killing substance in the world sold under the brand name of Roundup by Monsanto, as "probably carcinogenic to humans" (Group 2A).

Subsequently, many national regulatory authorities underwent a reevaluation of the risk posed by the exposure to glyphosate. Regulators in the United States, Europe (ECHA, EFSA), Canada, Japan and New Zealand reported that the glyphosate was unlikely to pose any carcinogenic risk to humans. California put glyphosate on its list of unsafe chemicals.

Since the publishing, IARC blamed its loss of reputation upon the agro-chemical industry.

==== Industry reactions ====
The American Chemistry Council (ACC), the trade group for U.S. chemical companies, declared that IARC evaluates how hazardous a substance is based on whether the substance could "cause cancer in humans under any circumstances, including at exposure levels beyond what is typical."

==== U.S. Congressional reactions ====
In early 2016, members of the scientific panel that reviewed glyphosate in 2015 were issued legal requests in the U.S. related to their work. In April 2016, internal IARC officials told its experts to not release documents or comply with the legal requests related to its review of glyphosate.

In the fall of 2016, the U.S. House Committee on Oversight and Government Reform held a briefing to ask officials from the National Institutes of Health (NIH) about NIH's grant funding to the IARC. The NIH grant database showed that it has given the IARC over $1.2 million in 2016. Jason Chaffetz (Republican) asked the NIH to give his committee details of its standards for awarding grants and vetting grant nominees. Additionally, Congressman Robert Aderholt (Republican), chairman of the House Appropriations Subcommittee on Agriculture, wrote a letter in June 2016 to the head of the NIH questioning the funding of IARC. Jason Chaffetz argued that the IARC uses inconsistent standards to conclude that substances are carcinogenic. However, IARC respond that the Working Groups methods are "widely respected for their scientific rigor, standardized and transparent process and for freedom from conflicts of interest." Director of IARC Chris Wild further added that the IARC only chooses substances to evaluate from which there already exists a body of scientific literature that says there is a carcinogenic risk to humans. Wild said that because IARC does not select substances at random, it has a low rate of determining a substance as not being cancer-causing.

==== Criticism of monographs methodology ====
On 26 October 2015, a Working Group of 22 experts from 10 countries evaluated the carcinogenicity of the consumption of red meat and processed meat and classified the consumption of red meat as "probably carcinogenic to humans (Group 2A)", mainly related to colorectal cancer, and to pancreatic and prostate cancer. It also evaluated processed meat to be "carcinogenic to humans (Group 1)", due to "sufficient evidence in humans that the consumption of processed meat causes colorectal cancer".

Marcel Kuntz, a French director of research at the French National Centre for Scientific Research, criticized the classification because it did not assess the risks associated with exposure (probability of getting a cancer from certain exposure): for example, red meat is qualified as probably carcinogenic, but the quantity of consumed red meat at which it could become dangerous is not specified. Ed Yong, a British science journalist, criticized the agency and its "confusing" category system for misleading the public. IARC answered in a press release their mission was not to evaluate potency or to assess the risks but only to determine scientifically the strength of carcinogenetic evidence.

Some of the items that the IARC classifies, such as mobile phones (Group 2B) and processed meat (Group 1) have caused controversy. The agency has also classified drinking very hot beverages – around 70 °C (158 °F) – as a probable carcinogen (Group 2A).

=== Aspartame (2023) ===
In July 2023, an IARC committee concluded that there was "limited evidence" for aspartame causing cancer in humans, classifying the sweetener as possibly carcinogenic. The lead investigator of the IARC report stated that the classification "shouldn't really be taken as a direct statement that indicates that there is a known cancer hazard from consuming aspartame. This is really more of a call to the research community to try to better clarify and understand the carcinogenic hazard that may or may not be posed by aspartame consumption."

A WHO expert committee on food additives added that the limited cancer assessment indicated no reason to change the recommended acceptable daily intake level for aspartame of 40 mg per kg of body weight per day, reaffirming the safety of consuming aspartame within this limit.

The US Food and Drug Administration responded to the report by stating:

Aspartame being labeled by IARC as "possibly carcinogenic to humans" does not mean that aspartame is actually linked to cancer. The FDA disagrees with IARC's conclusion that these studies support classifying aspartame as a possible carcinogen to humans. FDA scientists reviewed the scientific information included in IARC's review in 2021 when it was first made available and identified significant shortcomings in the studies on which IARC relied.

== Members ==
The five founding states were the US, France, Italy, West Germany and the UK.

They were later joined by 23 other members, of which 3 left:

| Countries | Entry | | Exit | |
| Countries | Date | Resolution | Date | Resolution |
|---|---|---|---|---|
| Australia | September 1965 | GC/1/R1 | | |
| USSR then Russia | September 1965 | GC/1/R2 | | |
| Israel | April 1966 | GC/2/R1 | October 1971 | GC/9/R11 |
| Netherlands | April 1967 | GC/3/R1 | | |
| Belgium | October 1970 | GC/8/R10 | | |
| Japan | May 1972 | GC/10/R1 | | |
| Sweden | May 1979 | GC/18/R1 | | |
| Canada | January 1982 | GC/22/R1 | | |
| Finland | April 1986 | GC/27/R1 | | |
| Norway | April 1987 | GC/28/R1 | | |
| Denmark | May 1990 | GC/31/R1 | | |
| Switzerland | May 1990 | GC/31/R2 | | |
| Argentina | May 1998 | GC/39/R1 | May 2001 | GC/42/R3 |
| Brazil | May 1998 | GC/39/R2 | May 2001 | GC/42/R4 |
| Spain | May 2003 | GC/44/R1 | | |
| India | May 2006 | GC/48/R1 | | |
| South Korea | May 2006 | GC/48/R2 | | |
| Ireland | May 2007 | GC/49/R2 | | |
| Austria | May 2008 | GC/50/R18 | | |
| Brazil | May 2013 | GC/55/17 | | |
| Qatar | May 2013 | GC/55/19 | | |
| Morocco | May 2015 | GC/57/19 | | |
| China | May 2021 | GC/63/R1 | | |
| Saudi Arabia | May 2024 | GC/66/R1 | | |
| Egypt | May 2024 | GC/66/R2 | | |

== See also ==
- Air pollution
- European Prospective Investigation into Cancer and Nutrition
- European Organisation for Research and Treatment of Cancer (EORTC)
- Genotoxic
- Mutagen
- National Cancer Institute (US)
- Toxicology
