= Collman =

Collman is a surname. Notable people with the surname include:

- Gwen W. Collman, American epidemiologist
- James P. Collman (born 1932), American chemist

== See also ==
- Disodium tetracarbonylferrate, the dioxane solvated sodium salt of which is known as Collman's reagent
- Coleman (disambiguation)
