= Brewer Gold Mine =

Defunct mine in South Carolina

Coordinates: 34°38′09″N 80°24′56″W

The Brewer Gold Mine, located near Jefferson in Chesterfield County, South Carolina, United States, operated intermittently from the early 1820s until 1995. From 1987 to 1995, the Brewer Gold Mining Company extracted over 12 million tons of ore and waste rock through open-pit mining, before major infrastructure failures that caused contamination of nearby waterways and the death of aquatic life up to 50 miles downstream. Brewer Gold Mining Company, a subsidiary of Costain Holdings, abandoned the site after initial clean up plans failed, resulting in acid rock drainage in Little Fork Creek. Responsibility for the site's cleanup then fell to the South Carolina Department of Health and Environmental Control (SC DHEC) and the Environmental Protection Agency (EPA), which designated Brewer a Superfund site. Today, the Canadian company Carolina Rush is exploring the possibility of reopening the site to mine for gold and copper.

== Broader context ==
=== Gold mining in South Carolina ===
Gold mining began in earnest in South Carolina in the early 1820s following the small-scale independent discoveries of gold deposits in the early 1800s. Alongside Haile Gold mine, Brewer mine became a powerhouse in the SC gold mining industry. By the early 1830s, these mines employed hundreds of miners and attracted outsider investment. During the 1830s and 1840s, steam power and industrial practice revolutionized mining. Mines began utilizing more advanced methods to recover and process gold more effectively, many of which used dangerous chemicals like mercury. By the 1850s, most surface deposits were exhausted and companies struggled to adapt to deeper mining. Corporations began employing miners that immigrated from or descended from immigrants of Cornwall. The Cornish miners had greater expertise required for deeper mining and the use of blasting. At this time, gold mining is much more lucrative in the California Gold Rush, enticing companies to move. Regardless, gold mining remained an integral part of South Carolina's economy. Like many major companies, Brewer leveraged enslaved laborers to mine ore and perform essential support tasks like cutting timber and growing food for miners

The 1900s saw further decline in gold mining as efforts concentrated towards the World Wars. Several sporadic but unsuccessful attempts to gold mine in SC occurred after the war until the late 20th century when there was a renewed interest in gold mining with rising gold prices. The Brewer Gold Mining Company began operating in the 1980s, exploring previously low-grade ore deposits that were deemed unprofitable using the cyanide heap-leach method for recovery. It is now a Superfund site, and is currently being explored for reopening.

=== Americanism and gold nationalism ===
Canada's Carolina Rush is working to reopen the Brewer site for gold mining, despite its designation as a former Superfund site. The company has exclusive rights to explore the property until 2030 The company describes the area as containing 'highly prospective terrain' and frames its operations as 'expeditions'—invoking the language of American nationalism and frontier mythology of the Gold Rush.

== Superfund identification and hazards ==
A dam failure at the mine in 1990 released over 10 million gallons of cyanide-laden solution into Little Fork Creek, which led to fish kills extending nearly 50 miles downstream into the Lynches River. After mining operations ceased in 1995, the Brewer Gold Company undertook reclamation activities under the oversight of the South Carolina Department of Health and Environmental Control (SCDHEC). However, by 1999, the company abandoned the site without completing the necessary cleanup, leaving behind untreated acid rock drainage and other contaminants, which posed ongoing threats to local water sources and ecosystems.

These other contaminants included arsenic, selenium, and heavy metals such as aluminium, barium, chromium, mercury, and vanadium. These contaminants can cause respiratory failure, cardiovascular disease, and many are known carcinogens. Recognizing the site's risks to human health and the environment, the United States Environmental Protection Agency (EPA) proposed the Brewer Gold Mine for inclusion in the National Priorities List (NPL) on September 23, 2004. The site was officially added to the NPL on April 27, 2005, making it eligible for federal Superfund cleanup efforts.

== Cleanup ==
In 2006, contaminated seepage from nearby springs was collected to prevent further spread of pollutants. Contaminated water from the on-site pit and sediment pond was pumped out and stored in a lined storage pond. Surface water discharges into Little Fork Creek and overall surface water quality were monitored to assess the effectiveness of these initial measures.

A comprehensive site-wide remedial investigation was completed in December 2010 to assess the extent of contamination. A feasibility study was finalized in January 2013, evaluating options for surface water protection and long-term remediation strategies. In September 2014, the EPA signed a Record of Decision focusing on the capture and treatment of mine-impacted groundwater to protect surface water resources. A remedial design report was completed in October 2016, outlining plans to construct a new, updated water treatment plant.

== Specific history ==
Development of the Brewer Gold Mine began in 1828. Early mining activities used placer techniques to remove ore from weathered, decomposed portions of the deposit. Gold was collected by washing the ore in rockers.

From 1879 to 1894 a second period of mining occurred. During this time, a pipeline was built to draw water from Little Fork Creek for use in hydraulic mining.

In the 1940s and 1950s, the site was mined for topaz, which had been identified earlier as a mineral deposit. The topaz was excavated from one and possibly two small pit(s) north of the Brewer pit during this time.

In June 1987, the Brewer Gold Company was established to operate new facilities. Brewer Gold Company operated the property as an open pit-leach operation which expanded to include pre-existing pits as well as many shafts, adits, and underground workings. From 1987 to 1995 was the most recent period of mining, this was also the largest period of mining where the Brewer Gold Company mined over 12 million tons of ore and waste rock from three open pits at the Site.

In 2005, Brewer Gold Mine was declared a Superfund site by the federal government. In January 2020, Carolina Rush gained the right to explore and purchase the former Brewer Gold mine property, with an option period through 2030.

Gold mining activities at the 1,000-acre site date back to 1828, with significant operations from 1987 to 1995. During this period, the Brewer Gold Company extracted over 12 million tons of ore and waste rock. In October 1990, heavy rainfall led to a dam failure, releasing over 10 million gallons of cyanide solution into Little Fork Creek, resulting in a substantial fish kill extending nearly 50 miles downstream in the Lynches River. Following this environmental disaster, the South Carolina Department of Health and Environmental Control (SCDHEC) mandated the closure and reclamation of the mine. However, acid rock drainage emerged from several seeps near Little Fork Creek, necessitating further intervention.

=== Initial response (1990–1995) ===
In response to the cyanide spill, the mine constructed a water treatment plant to address the contaminated discharge, operating under a permit from SCDHEC until 1999.

=== EPA intervention (Post 1999) ===
After the abandonment of the site by the Brewer Gold Company and its parent company, Costain Holdings, in 1999, the Environmental Protection Agency (EPA) assumed responsibility for water treatment activities.

=== Superfund designation and cleanup efforts ===
The site was designated as a Superfund site, leading to extensive remediation efforts. These included continued operation and maintenance of the water treatment system to manage acid rock drainage and prevent further contamination of nearby water bodies.

=== Five-year reviews ===
The EPA has conducted multiple five-year reviews to assess the effectiveness of the implemented remedies. These reviews ensure that the cleanup measures continue to protect human health and the environment.

== Current state ==
The Brewer Gold Company abandoned the site and the cleanup efforts in 1999 and was eventually dissolved as a company by its corporate owner, Costain, due to forfeiture at the end of 2007, against court order demands from DHEC and the EPA. This forfeiture left the EPA to provide care to the site according to the Comprehensive Environmental Response, Compensation, and Liability Act of 1980 (CERCLA), although the EPA had no legal right to the location long term or its final arrangement. The South Carolina Circuit Court approved an exploratory receiver of the site in 2019, meaning a new owner utilizing the site alongside continual waste cleaning efforts. At the beginning of 2020, the Pancontinental Resource Corporation (Pancon), a Canadian company later named Carolina Rush, alongside Environmental Risk Transfer, was chosen to have the exclusive right to explore and purchase the site by 2030. In search of gold and copper, Carolina Rush is interested in obtaining a mining permit and continuing to mine in the Superfund site. In November 2020, the drill depth of Carolina Rush's exploratory holes reached 2,000 feet, when all previous drillings only reached a depth of 60 feet. According to Layton Croft, the president of the company, the results were promising, with 96% of samples having detectable traces of gold. As of the beginning of 2024, more than 11,000 meters have been drilled using diamond core, sonic drill hole, and rotary air blast (RAB) techniques, with results being released for each of the samples taken through each method. According to The Brewer Option Agreement as of 2024, the company is not required to pay the annual exclusivity payments of 2025-2030 until they own the site, as well as the final cost not being decided until Carolina Rush decides to close the deal. In addition, the company had to pay $150,000 into an escrow account due to the presence of 19 geophysical survey boreholes that were capped, but the money can be returned once there is proof of abandonment of the exploratory boreholes. Under the EPA's website, there is no current status of the site, and all Five-Year Review (2011, 2016, 2021) links are no longer accessible. These changes made to the Brewer Gold Mine Superfund Site description and link usability have been made as of early 2025, and are most likely applicable to others on the list of Superfund sites as well. This is most likely due to the Trump Administration cutting the EPA's budget by 65% and purging its Office of Research and Development by firing or reassigning workers to new administrative priorities, such as aligning with Trump's goal of reducing fossil fuel regulation, a goal that conflicts with the findings and mission of the EPA's science office. Project 2025 calls for the science offices' Integrated Risk Information System, a system used to measure restrictions based on human health from exposure, to be eliminated, along with others like it.

California Representative Zoe Lofgren claims that Trump has distorted and politicized science against pollution for economic gain, as the "EPA cannot meet its legal obligation to use the best available science without ORD (Office of Research and Development), and that's the point. Donald Trump and Elon Musk are putting their polluter buddies' bottom lines over the health and safety of Americans." With information from the EPA's website being deleted or inaccessible alongside the political administration calling for budget cuts and program shutdowns of environmental cleanup, there is a possibility of Superfund sites disappearing without resolution, or for the government to fill in this vacuum of public safety protocol in order to loosen fossil fuel regulation and exposure.

=== Photos from Brewer Site EPA On-Scene Coordinator ===
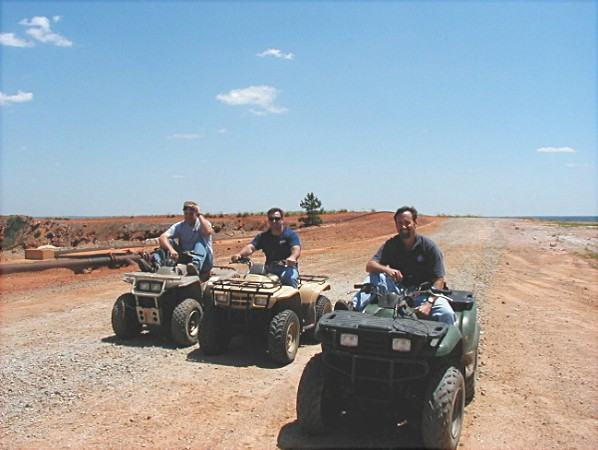
Touring Brewer Gold

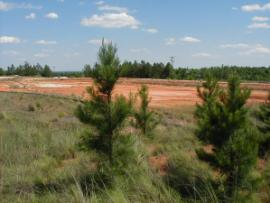
Eroded hillside at Brewer

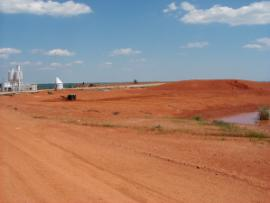
Slacking operation to dry sediment

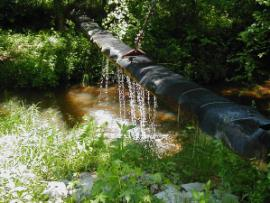
Streambed at Brewer

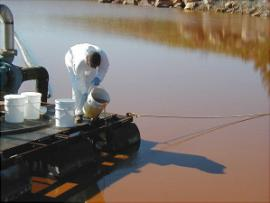
Water sampling

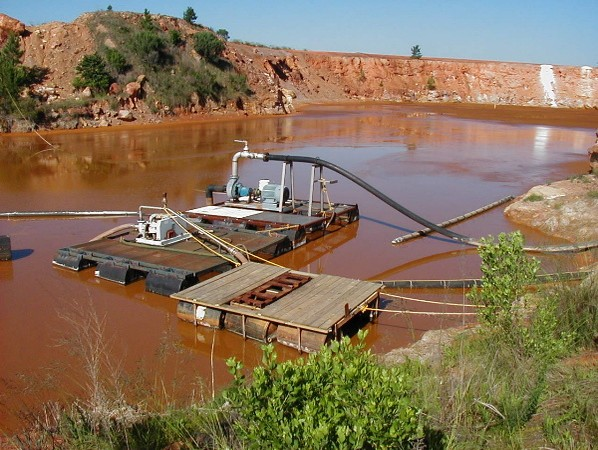
Filtration pond

== See also ==
List of Superfund sites in South Carolina
