= David Rall =

American physician

David P. Rall
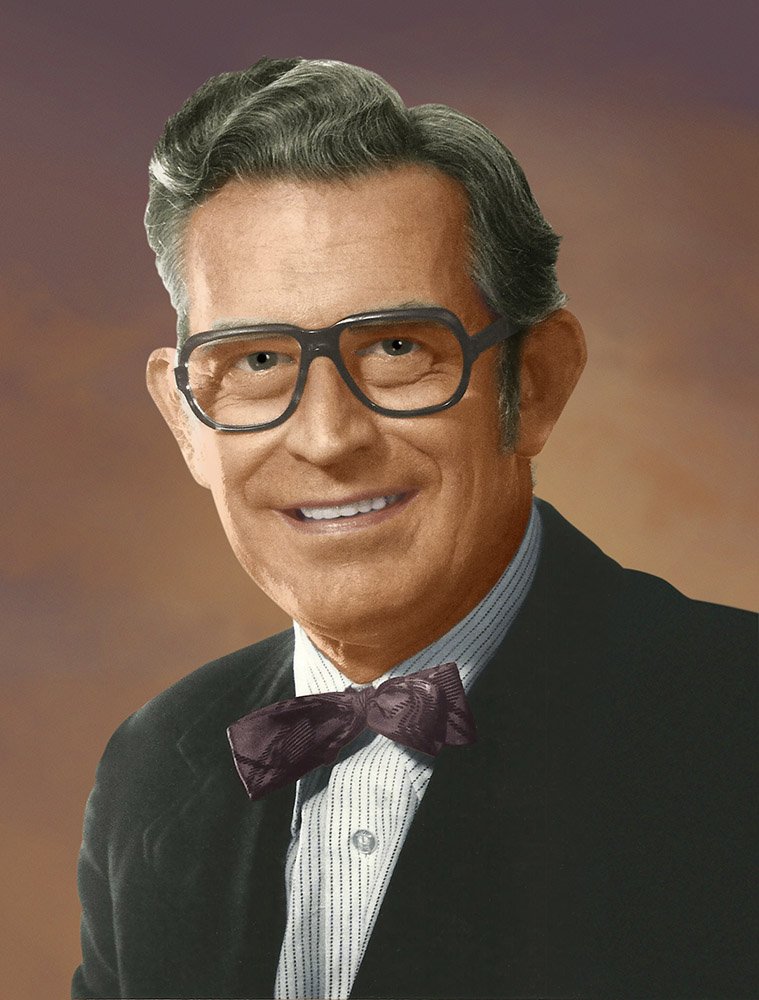

Director of National Institute of Environmental Health Sciences
- In office 1971–1990
- Preceded by: Paul Kotin
- Succeeded by: Kenneth Olden

Personal details
- Born: August 3, 1926 Naperville, Illinois, U.S.
- Died: September 28, 1999 (aged 73) Bordeaux, France
- Education: North Central College (BS), Northwestern University (MD), (PhD)

David Platt Rall (August 3, 1926 – September 28, 1999) was a cancer specialist and a leader in environmental health studies, whose work in environmental health helped turn it into a scientific discipline. Rall also advanced public health and prevention. He directed the National Institute of Environmental Health Sciences from 1971 to 1990, year in which he retired. His work on toxicology and carcinogenesis was recognized by his appointment as the first director of the National Toxicology Program in 1978. He held the rank of Assistant Surgeon General in the United States Public Health Service. He also chaired the World Health Organization's Program on Chemical Safety.

== Early life and education ==
Born in Naperville, Illinois, Rall attended North Central College and received his BS degree in 1946 where his father was president; his MS in Pharmacology from Northwestern University in 1948; his M.D. and Ph.D. in pharmacology from Northwestern University School of Medicine in 1951. Rall interned at Bellevue Hospital in New York City from 1952 – 1953 when he joined the National Cancer Institute in 1954. He began his research career as a scientist at NCI, where he served in a variety of research and administrative positions until 1971. Rall also served as a surgeon (1955–1959), a senior surgeon (1959–1960), medical director (1963–1971), and assistant surgeon general (1971–1990) in the United States Public Health Services. He pioneered the effort to identify and understand the elements that make up the human environment and their consequences for human health. Rall was devoted in educating scientists, governments, and the world community to the critical need to address the existence of environmental agents and their consequences for human health.

== Academic career ==
Rall's early work on the blood brain barrier led to modern treatment to prevent the spread of leukemia cells to the brain. Much of Rall's work focused on reducing the side effects of anticancer drugs, which are often toxic in patients when administered in large enough doses to destroy cancer cells. He also researched the effects of prolonged exposure to chemicals in the environments of people in certain occupations. In March 1971, he left the established world of research and clinical treatment at the National Institutes of Health's (NIH) main campus in Bethesda armed with a desire to reach beyond the treatment of chronic disease to seek its underlying causes and, through research, to learn how to prevent such diseases caused by environmental agents. Rall arrived in the newly established Research Triangle Park in North Carolina, where he set about the work of conceptualizing and then actualizing a state-of- the-art research facility among the pine forest and pastureland of the area, a prescient move that would situate the Institute at the epicenter of what would become an internationally renowned research commons. He created the NIEHS journal, Environmental Health Perspectives, in 1972.

Rall developed the NIEHS Extramural Program to administer an expanding portfolio of PHS grants and awards in environmental health science to researchers at colleges and universities throughout the United States. Rall served as the U.S. coordinator of cooperative environmental health programs between the United States and the U.S.S.R., the United Kingdom, Egypt, Japan, the People's Republic of China, Taiwan, Italy, Finland, and Spain. As a result of his work in attempting to strengthen international scientific cooperation, in 1975 the NIEHS was designated by the World Health Organization (WHO) as a Collaborating Center for Environmental Health Effects. In 1980, Rall played a leading role in an effort to establish the WHO's International Programme on Chemical Safety (IPCS), the goal of which is to provide an internationally evaluated scientific basis for the assessment of the risks to human health and the environment of chemicals. In 1978, the NIEHS was designated as the focal point for the establishment of the NTP, a cooperative effort to coordinate toxicological testing programs within the Department of Health and Human Services, and Rall was appointed its director. Also, during that NTP-formative era, Rall helped establish the 1978 Public Law that initiated the innovative Report on Carcinogens. He was the author of some 200 scientific publications and was awarded the DHEW Distinguished Service Medal of the PHS and the Arnold J. Lehman Award of the Society of Toxicology. In 1988, Rall received a Merit Award from the Northwestern Alumni Association for his professional accomplishments.

== Recognitions ==
Rall received many recognitions for his lifetime commitment to public service and scientific research including the PHS's Distinguished Service Medal, which he received in 1975 and again in 1990 for sustained leadership in the development of the field of environmental health science. In 1979 he was accepted as a Member of the National Academy of Sciences' Institute of Medicine (IOM), whose membership consists of the preeminent physicians of the United States. In 1988 the WHO presented Rall with the Health for All 2000 Medal. He was recognized in 1989 by the Institute of Occupational Health in Helsinki, which awarded to him its Distinguished Service Medal. Rall was also honored in 1989 by the Collegium Ramazzini, an international academic society that examines critical issues in occupational and environmental medicine with the goal of preventing disease and promoting health around the world. Also, the National Academy of Medicine created the David Rall Award, honoring him, given to a member of the Institute of Medicine who has demonstrated particularly distinguished leadership as a chair of a study committee or other such activities in a manner that was particularly exemplary, demonstrating a commitment substantially above and beyond the usual expectations of a committee chair.

== Retirement ==
In 1990, Rall retired from the NIEHS but remained extremely active in the environmental health arena. He chaired the IPCS and held a variety of other positions including foreign secretary of the IOM, board member of the Environmental Defense Fund, chairman of the Scientific Advisory Council of the Hawaii Heptachlor Research and Education Foundation, and member of the Board of Scientific Counselors of the National Institute for Occupational Safety and Health. Following his retirement, he chaired the program of chemical safety for the World Health Organization, served as foreign secretary of the Institute of Medicine at the National Academy of Sciences and was a board member of the Environmental Defense Fund. Rall also was a scientific counselor at the National Institute for Occupational Safety and Health. The American Public Health Association established a permanent honor in recognition of Rall's life and work: the David P. Rall Award for Advocacy. The David P. Rall Building, the main edifice on the NIEHS's Research Triangle Park campus, was dedicated to his memory in 2000.

Rall died in Bordeaux, France as a result of injuries sustained in an automobile accident.
