= New York and New Jersey Education and Research Center =

The New York and New Jersey Education and Research Center is one of eighteen Education and Research Centers funded by the National Institute for Occupational Safety and Health (NIOSH). The NYNJERC was established in 1978.

The New York-New Jersey Education and Research Center (NYNJERC) is the hub of education and research in Occupational Safety and Health (OSH) in Federal Region 2, comprising the States of New York and New Jersey, the Commonwealth of Puerto Rico, and the U. S. Virgin Islands.

The mission of the NYNJERC is to assure safe and healthful working conditions for working men and women by preparing the next generation of professional leaders in OSH through training programs that equip graduates with the knowledge, skills, and attitudes that they will need to understand, evaluate, prevent, manage, and treat occupational disease and injury in the workers of its region and across the United States.

== History ==
The NYNJERC was founded by Irving J. Selikoff, MD, a renowned pulmonary physician and pioneer in Occupational and Environmental Medicine (OEM) who made seminal discoveries pertaining to the human carcinogenicity of asbestos and was centrally involved in creation of both the National Institute for Occupational Safety and Health (NIOSH) and the Occupational Safety and Health Administration (OSHA). The program has received support from NIOSH since 1978. Under a series of leaders in academic occupational medicine, the program has built research and educational programs and has trained two generations of OSH professionals, many of whom now occupy senior leadership positions and populate the OSH workforce in Federal Region 2 and across the US.

== Institutions ==
The NYNJERC is a consortium of five educational institutions in two states, and its nine programs in OSH training cover three of the four essential core academic areas of OSH. The programs are:

- Industrial Hygiene (IH) at CUNY School of Public Health, [New York City (NYC), NY];
- Occupational Medicine (OM) at Icahn School of Medicine at Mount Sinai (NYC, NY);
- Occupational Medicine at Rutgers School of Public Health (Piscataway, NJ);

• Occupational and Environmental Health Nursing (OEHN) at New York University (NYC, NY);

- Occupational Safety & Health Engineering at New Jersey Institute of Technology (Newark, NJ);
- Occupational Ergonomics and Biomechanics at New York University (NYC, NY);
- Continuing Education (CE), Outreach and Interdisciplinary Training at Rutgers School of Public Health (Piscataway, NJ); and the
- Pilot Project Research Training Program at Icahn School of Medicine at Mount Sinai (NYC, NY).

== Interdisciplinary activities ==
The NY/NJ ERC conducts an annual Historical Perspectives on Occupational Safety and Health Tour. The tour provides trainees the opportunity to see how work impacts health, by visiting work locations around the country that have high injury rates. The tour provides the opportunity for students to understand the importance of interdisciplinary collaboration to address occupational safety and health issues.

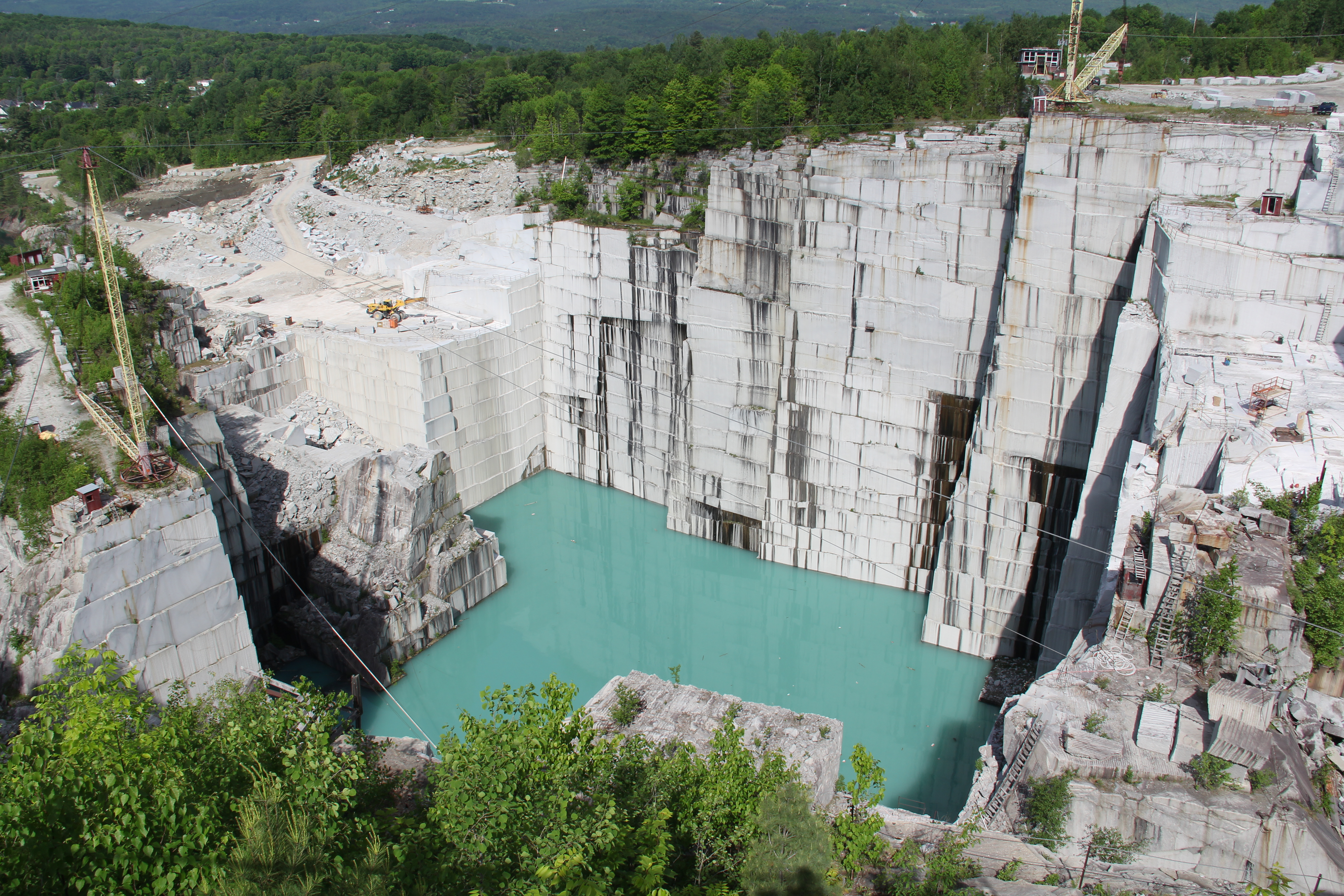
Rock of Ages Granite Quarry Barre VT

Some of the sites visited include:

- LAB Chrysotile Thetford Mines, Quebec
- Waterfront Fishing Safety Portland, Maine
- Rock of Ages Granite Quarry, Barre, VT
- Materion Beryllium, Elmore, OH

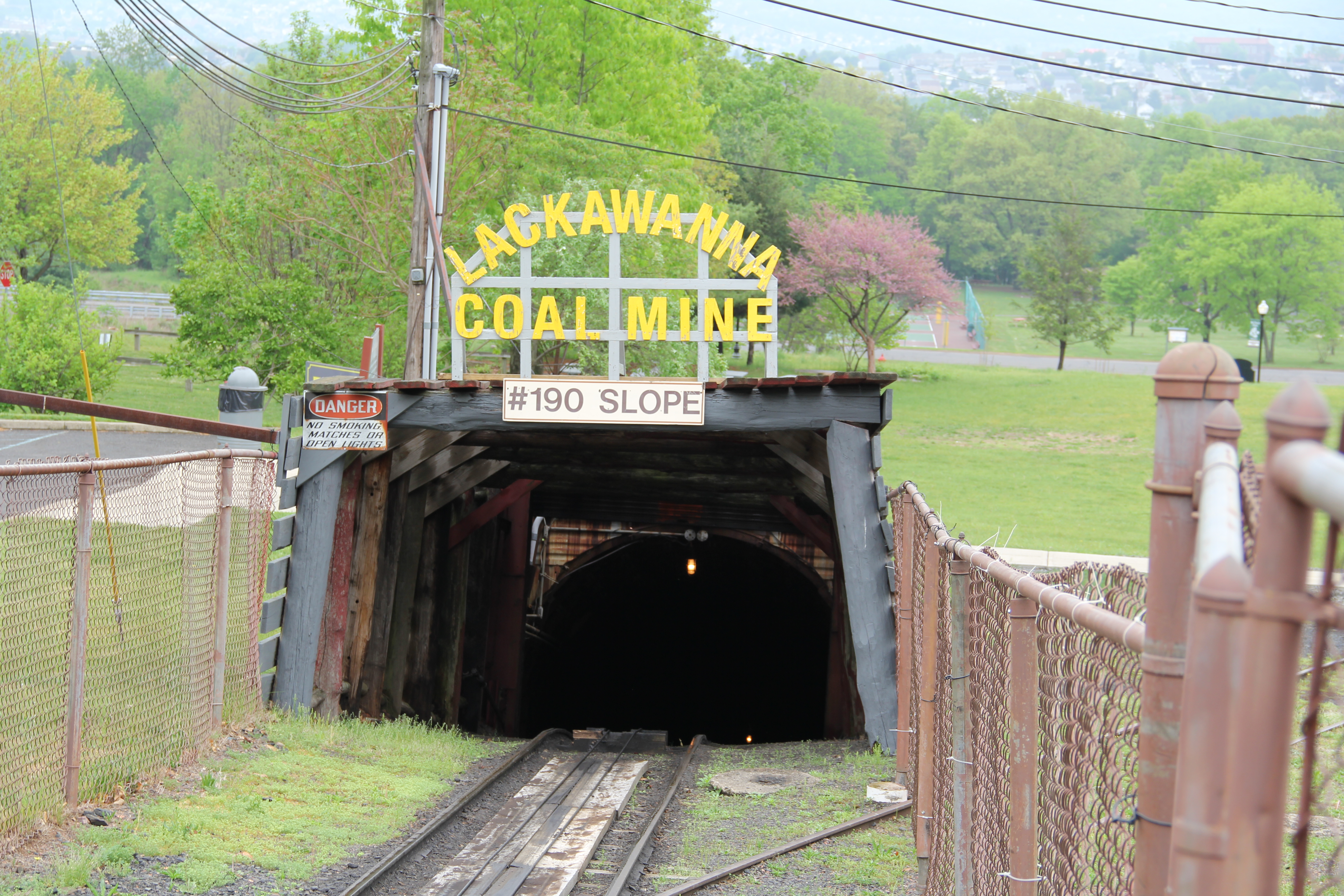
Lackawanna Coal Mine Scranton PA

- Ford River Rouge Assembly Plant, Dearborn, MI
- GM Detroit/Hamtramck Assembly

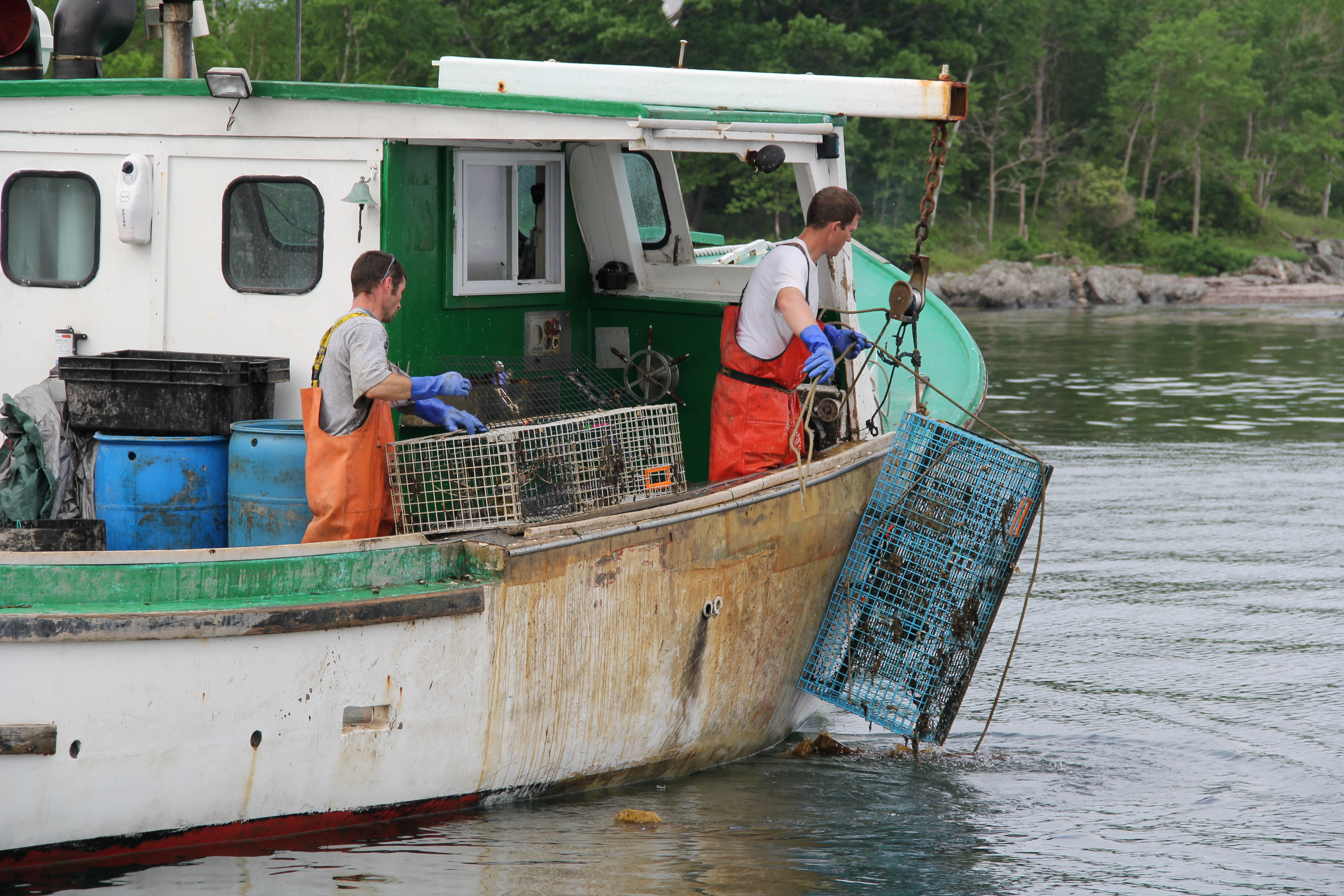
Lobster boats Portland ME

- Love Canal
- Sappi Paper
- Lackawanna Coal Mine, Scranton, Pennsylvania
- Rivers of Steel Homestead Steel, Pittsburgh, PA
- Boott Cotton Mills Museum, Lowell, Massachusetts
- Noblehurst Farms, Linwood, New York
- Indian Ladder Farm, Altamont, New York
- Wightman Specialty Woods, Portlandville, NY
- NIOSH Personal Protective Technology Laboratory, Pittsburgh, PA

The NY/NJERC also provides interdisciplinary educational opportunities through the OSH research methods course, student research day, and the site visits course. The site visits course brings trainees to industries in New York City and New Jersey, including hospitals, set design studios, concrete/glass counter top manufacturers, power generating stations, wastewater treatment facility, and landfill operations. Trainees learn key concepts of industrial hygiene and safety, including hazard recognition and control methods.

Each year faculty and trainees post information about the Historical Perspectives Tour on its blog, http://nynjerc.blogspot.com.

== Annual Scientific Meetings ==
The NYNJERC has presented an Annual Scientific Meeting since 1979. The first Annual Scientific Meeting was September 27–28, 1979 in Hasbrouck Heights, NJ. The Scientific Meeting discussed cancer of the bladder, asbestos hazards in schools, and the hazards of lead, mercury, and chemical waste disposal (Love Canal). Over the years, the NYNJERC has presented important occupational safety and health information on topics ranging from nanotechnology to globalization. The 37th Annual Scientific Meeting discusses safety and health hazards of healthcare workers.

The 37th Annual Scientific Meeting was held on April 1, 2016 at the Icahn School of Medicine at Mount Sinai. The topic was Occupational Safety and Health for Healthcare Workers. The keynote addresses were provided by John Howard, Director of NIOSH and David Michaels, Assistant Secretary of Labor for the OSHA. The presentations are available on the NYNJERC website.

Two presentations from our 30th Annual Scientific Meeting (April 2009) are available on YouTube. Dr. Stephen Levin presented the Historical Aspect of Asbestos, including asbestos related research at Mount Sinai, a review of Dr. Irving Selloff coming to Mount Sinai, and the work he and others accomplished. Dr. Jack Caravanos presented the Historical Aspects of Lead, providing the health impacts of lead on workers and other populations.

== Published research by faculty ==
- Lucchini RG, McDiarmid M, van der Laan G, Rosen M, Placidi D, Radon K, Ruchirawat M, Kurtz L and Landrigan P. Education and Training: Key Factors in Global Occupational and Environmental Health. Annals of Global Health. 2018; 84(3), pp. 439–441. DOI: https://doi.org/10.29024/aogh.2328.
- Reibman J, Levy-Carrick N, Miles T, Flynn K, Hughes C, Crane M, Lucchini RG. Destruction of the World Trade Towers: Lessons Learned from an Environmental Health Disaster. Ann Am Thorac Soc. 2016 Feb 12.
- Sharov P, Dowling R, Gogishvili M, Jones B, Caravanos J, et al., The prevalence of toxic hotspots in former Soviet countries. Environmental Pollution Volume 211, April 2016, Pages 346–353.
- Riley K, Slatin C, Rice C, Rosen M, et al. Managers’ Perceptions of the Value and Impact of HAZWOPER Worker Health and Safety Training. American Journal of Industrial Medicine, 2015 Jul; 58(7):780-787.
- Koshy K, Presutti M, Rosen M. Implementing the Hazard Communication Standard final rule: Lessons learned. Journal of Chemical Health and Safety, April 2015, 22(2) 23–31.
- Rosen M, Koshy K, Patel M. Safety and Health Certificate Programs: Practical Application Beyond Training. Journal of Safety Health and Environmental Research, Oct 2014, 10(2) 162–168.
- Caravanos J, et al., Blood Lead Levels in Mexico and Pediatric Burden of Disease Implications, Annals of Global Health, Volume 80, Issue 4, July–August 2014, Pages 269–277.
- Pinto, VJ, Sheikhzadeh, A, Halpern, M, Nordin, M. Assessment of engineering controls designed for handling unstable loads: An electromyography assessment. International journal of industrial ergonomics. 2013 March;43(2):181-186
- Sheikhzadeh, A, Kendall, O; Frankel, VH. Biomechanics of the hip IN: Basic Biomechanics of the Musculoskeletal System. Philadelphia : Lippincott Williams and Wilkins, 2012 4th ed.
- Sengupta A, and Latta, W, 2012, An Analysis of Grip Design for Manual Hammer Stapling Tool, 4th International Conference on Applied Human Factors and Ergonomics 2012 held on July 21–25, 2012, page 411–420.
- Sheikhzadeh, A, Yoon, J, Formosa, D, Domanska, B, Morgan, D, Schiff, M. The effect of a new syringe design on the ability of rheumatoid arthritis patients to inject a biological medication. Applied ergonomics. 2011 Jun 21;43(2):368-375
- Rosen M, Caravanos J, Milek D, Udasin I. An Innovative Approach to Interdisciplinary Occupational Safety and Health Education. American Journal of Industrial Medicine, 2011 Jul; 54(7):515-520.
