= List of Superfund sites in South Carolina =

This is a list of Superfund sites in South Carolina designated under the Comprehensive Environmental Response, Compensation, and Liability Act (CERCLA) environmental law. The CERCLA federal law of 1980 authorized the United States Environmental Protection Agency (EPA) to create a list of polluted locations requiring a long-term response to clean up hazardous material contaminations. These locations are known as Superfund sites, and are placed on the National Priorities List (NPL).

The NPL guides the EPA in "determining which sites warrant further investigation" for environmental remediation. As of March 10, 2011, there were 26 Superfund sites on the National Priorities List in South Carolina. One additional site is currently proposed for entry on the list. Four sites have been cleaned up and removed from the list.

== Superfund sites ==
Proposed for addition to National Priorities List
Deleted from National Priorities List

CERCLIS ID	Name	Town/County	Reason	Proposed	Listed	Construction completed	Partially deleted	Deleted
SCD058754789	Aqua-Tech Environmental Inc (Groce Labs)	Spartanburg		08/23/1994	12/16/1994			
SCD047563614	Admiral Home Appliances	Barnwell County						
SCN000407714	Barite Hill/Nevada Goldfields	McCormick	heavy metals	09/03/2008	04/09/2009			
SCD000447268	Beaunit Corp. (Circular Knit & Dye)	Greenville		06/24/1988	02/21/1990	09/25/1998		
SC1890008989	Savannah River Site (USDOE)	Aiken		07/14/1989	11/21/1989	09/13/1999		
SCD058753971	Helena Chemical Co. Landfill	Allendale		06/24/1988	02/21/1990	09/13/1999		
SCD003357589	Shuron Inc.	Barnwell		06/17/1996	12/23/1996			
SCD004773644	Independent Nail Co.	Beaufort	cyanide and heavy metals	09/08/1983	09/21/1984	09/13/1988	—	04/03/1995
SCD094995503	Kalama Specialty Chemicals	Beaufort		09/08/1983	09/21/1984	06/29/1999		
SC6170022762	Parris Island Marine Corps Recruit Depot	Beaufort		08/23/1994	12/16/1994			
SCD037405362	Wamchem, Inc.	Beaufort		09/08/1983	09/21/1984	09/30/1997		
SCD980711279	Geiger (C & M Oil)	Charleston		09/08/1983	09/21/1984	09/14/1998		
SCD980310239	Koppers Co., Inc. (Charleston Plant)	Charleston		02/07/1992	12/16/1994	09/25/2003		
SCD003360476	Macalloy Corporation	Charleston	heavy metals	10/22/1999	02/04/2000	09/26/2006		
SCD980558142	Medley Farm Drum Dump	Cherokee		06/10/1986	03/31/1989	09/29/1995		
SCD980558316	Carolawn, Inc.	Chester		12/30/1982	09/08/1983	05/18/1998		
SCD987577913	Brewer Gold Mine	Chesterfield	cyanide and heavy metals	09/23/2004	04/27/2005			
SCD003353026	Koppers Co., Inc. (Florence Plant)	Florence		09/08/1983	09/21/1984			
SCD980799456	Golden Strip Septic Tank Service	Greenville		01/22/1987	07/22/1987	09/30/1996	—	09/10/1998
SCD002601656	Para-Chem Southern, Inc.	Greenville		10/26/1989	08/30/1990	09/01/2000	12/11/1997	
SCD980840698	Rochester Property	Greenville	Groundwater contaminated with manganese, TCE, and bis(2-ethylhexyl)phthalate.	06/10/1986	10/04/1989	10/16/1995	—	10/09/2007
SCD003358744	US Finishing/Cone Mills	Greenville	cyanide and Hexavalent Chromium	03/10/2011	—	—	—	—
SCD980558043	Lexington County Landfill Area	Lexington		06/24/1988	10/04/1989	09/19/2001		
SCD003362217	Palmetto Wood Preserving	Lexington		09/08/1983	09/21/1984	09/30/1997		
SCD980711394	SCRDI Dixiana	Lexington		09/30/1997	09/08/1983	09/23/1992		
SCD003354412	Sangamo Weston/Twelve-Mile/Hartwell PCB	Pickens	PCBs	01/22/1987	02/21/1990	08/09/1999	09/28/1998 and 01/04/2002	
SCD037398120	Palmetto Recycling, Inc.	Richland	Soil and a nearby stream contaminated with lead, barium, and chromium. The site also had an unlined acid pit containing 1,800 gallons of acid waste, 100 drums of caustic waste, and an unstabilized pile of battery casings.	01/22/1987	07/22/1987	07/21/1999	—	10/13/2000
SCD000622787	SCRDI Bluff Road	Richland		12/30/1982	09/08/1983	09/09/1998		
SCD980558050	Townsend Saw Chain Co.	Richland		06/24/1988	02/21/90	09/23/1999		
SCD980839542	Elmore Waste Disposal	Spartanburg		06/24/1988	03/31/1989	09/24/1998		
SCD991279324	Leonard Chemical Co., Inc.	York		09/08/1983	09/21/1984			
SCD980844005	Rock Hill Chemical Co.	York		06/24/1988	02/21/1990	12/31/1996		

== Superfund Alternative sites ==
Superfund Alternative sites are locations that have been found to be polluted enough to be listed on the National Priorities List, but are cleaned up through other methods without formal listing. These are not "Superfund" sites since they do not go through the Superfund listing process. There are 10 SA sites in South Carolina.

CERCLIS ID	Name	County	Reason	Pre-CERCLIS screening
SCD000407376	Henry's Knob General Chemical	York	Ground water, sediment, soil, and surface water contaminated with arsenic, barium, chromium, copper, cobalt, magnesium, nickel, lead, zinc, and mercury.	09/25/2001

== See also ==
- List of Superfund sites in the United States
- List of environmental issues
- List of waste types
- TOXMAP
