= European Prospective Investigation into Cancer and Nutrition =

Europe-wide cohort study of diet and cancer

The European Prospective Investigation into Cancer and Nutrition (EPIC) study is a Europe-wide prospective cohort study of the relationships between diet and cancer, as well as other chronic diseases, such as cardiovascular disease. With over half a million participants, it is the largest study of diet and disease to be undertaken.

EPIC is coordinated by the International Agency for Research on Cancer (IARC), part of the World Health Organization, and funded by the "Europe Against Cancer" programme of the European Commission as well as multiple nation-specific grants and charities.

521,457 healthy adults, mostly aged 35–70 years, were enrolled in 23 centres in ten European countries: Denmark (11%), France (14%), Germany (10%), Greece (5%), Italy (9%), The Netherlands (8%), Norway (7%), Spain (8%), Sweden (10%) and the United Kingdom (17%). One UK centre (Oxford) recruited 27,000 vegetarians and vegans; this subgroup forms the largest study of this dietary group. Recruitment to the study took place between 1993 and 1999, and follow-up is planned for at least ten years, with repeat interview/questionnaires every three to five years. The main prospective data collected are standardised dietary questionnaires (self-administered or interview-based), seven-day food diaries, blood samples and anthropometric measurements, such as body mass index and waist-to-hip ratio. Additionally, the GenAir case-control study is studying the relationship of passive smoking and air pollution with cancers and respiratory diseases.

Up to 2004, there were over 26,000 new cases of cancer recorded among participants, with the most common being cancers of the breast, colorectum, prostate and lung. Current analyses are focusing particularly on stomach, colorectal, breast, prostate and lung cancers. The different dietary patterns in the different countries should enable reliable associations to be made between particular diets and cancers. The analysis of stored blood samples should also allow dissection of genetic factors involved in cancers, as well as the effects of hormones and hormone-like factors.

== Key findings ==
The study and its analysis is ongoing, but key results of the study retrieved in 2008 are:

- Lowered sodium from salt intake, high potassium from fruit and vegetable consumption promote healthy blood pressure levels
- High physical activity, involving some high impact activities is a good indicator of longevity and low risk of bone fractures
- High dietary fibre protects against bowel cancer
- Obesity increases a number of cancer risks
- High levels of sex hormones increase risk of breast cancer
- Increased fat intake increases the risk of breast cancer
- Increases in eating fruit and vegetables reduces the risk from all causes of an early death
- High blood glucose levels are associated with increased risk of heart disease
- The combined impact of four behaviours – not smoking, being physically active, moderate alcohol intake and the consumption of at least five fruit and vegetable servings a day – was estimated to amount to 14 additional years of life (Khaw et al. 2008)

Subsequent findings from 2012 and 2013 are:

- Dietary flavonoid intake is associated with reduced gastric carcinoma risk in women but not men
- Regular consumption of processed meat increases the risk of cardiovascular diseases and death from cancer

Subsequent findings from 2021 are:

- Dietary factors associated with reduced cancer mortality included raw vegetable intake; dietary fiber intake; the Mediterranean diet; other diet patterns included low meat eaters, vegetarians/vegans, or fish eaters.

== Selected papers ==
Review

- Riboli E (January 2001). "The European Prospective Investigation into Cancer and Nutrition (EPIC): plans and progress". J. Nutr. 131 (1): 170S – 175S. doi:10.1093/jn/131.1.170S. PMID 11208958.

Primary

- Bingham SA, Day NE, Luben R; et al. (May 2003). "Dietary fibre in food and protection against colorectal cancer in the European Prospective Investigation into Cancer and Nutrition (EPIC): an observational study". Lancet. 361 (9368): 1496–501. doi:10.1016/S0140-6736(03)13174-1. PMID 12737858. S2CID 44459032.
- González CA, Jakszyn P, Pera G, et al. (March 2006). "Meat intake and risk of stomach and esophageal adenocarcinoma within the European Prospective Investigation Into Cancer and Nutrition (EPIC)". J. Natl. Cancer Inst. 98 (5): 345–54. doi:10.1093/jnci/djj071. hdl:10029/7178. PMID 16507831.
- Khaw KT, Bingham S, Welch A, et al. (March 2001). "Relation between plasma ascorbic acid and mortality in men and women in EPIC-Norfolk prospective study: a prospective population study. European Prospective Investigation into Cancer and Nutrition". Lancet. 357 (9257): 657–63. doi:10.1016/S0140-6736(00)04128-3. PMID 11247548. S2CID 34752014.
- Khaw KT, Wareham N, Bingham S, Welch A, Luben R, Day N (January 2008). "Combined impact of health behaviours and mortality in men and women: the EPIC-Norfolk prospective population study". PLOS Med. 5 (1): e12. doi:10.1371/journal.pmed.0050012. PMC 2174962. PMID 18184033.
- Miller AB, Altenburg HP, Bueno-de-Mesquita B, et al. (January 2004). "Fruits and vegetables and lung cancer: Findings from the European Prospective Investigation into Cancer and Nutrition". Int. J. Cancer. 108 (2): 269–76. doi:10.1002/ijc.11559. PMID 14639614.
- Norat T, Bingham S, Ferrari P, et al. (June 2005). "Meat, fish, and colorectal cancer risk: the European Prospective Investigation into cancer and nutrition". J. Natl. Cancer Inst. 97 (12): 906–16. doi:10.1093/jnci/dji164. PMC 1913932. PMID 15956652.
- Trichopoulou A, Orfanos P, Norat T, et al. (April 2005). "Modified Mediterranean diet and survival: EPIC-elderly prospective cohort study". BMJ. 330 (7498): 991. doi:10.1136/bmj.38415.644155.8F. PMC 557144. PMID 15820966.
- van Gils CH, Peeters PH, Bueno-de-Mesquita HB, et al. (January 2005). "Consumption of vegetables and fruits and risk of breast cancer". JAMA. 293 (2): 183–93. doi:10.1001/jama.293.2.183. hdl:1874/11581. PMID 15644545.
- Verheus M, Peeters PH, Rinaldi S, et al. (August 2006). "Serum C-peptide levels and breast cancer risk: results from the European Prospective Investigation into Cancer and Nutrition (EPIC)". Int. J. Cancer. 119 (3): 659–67. doi:10.1002/ijc.21861. hdl:1874/19269. PMID 16572422. S2CID 25233808.
