= Lorenzo Tomatis =

Italian oncologist (1929–2007)

Lorenzo Tomatis

Lorenzo (Renzo) Tomatis (Sassoferrato, Italy, 2 January 1929–Lyon, France, 21 September 2007) was an Italian physician and experimental oncologist who researched carcinogenesis and its primary prevention.

Tomatis served as the Director from 1982 until 1993 of the International Agency for Research on Cancer (IARC). During his tenure at IARC, Tomatis led the effort to create the IARC Monographs on the Evaluation of Carcinogenic Risk to Humans (the so-called “orange books”), a tool for the primary prevention of cancer.

Tomatis produced over 350 publications and 10 books. He developed essays on carcinogenesis bioassays which recognized trans-placental and trans-generational carcinogenics, thus highlighting the vulnerabilities of early-life exposure.

Tomatis translated many animal experimental findings to human risk. He used these many qualifications to promote health strategies for the primary prevention of cancer—that is, reduced exposure to carcinogens.

In addition Tomatis also studied the sociology of science, especially the causes of the 'brain drain' from Italy.

== Early years ==
Tomatis was born in Sassoferrato, Italy He graduated from the University of Turin with a degree in medicine in 1953 and with a degree in hygiene and preventive medicine in 1955. After a brief stint as a medical officer with a regiment of Italian Army Alpine troops, he obtained a degree in occupational health in 1957—his interest in the role of chemicals as potential causes of cancer having become evident.

In 1959, Tomatis joined Phillipe Shubik's team at the Division of Oncology in the Chicago Medical School. "According to Shubik:

"He was a careful and thoughtful investigator who was able to think of probable advances before many others. He organized a tissue culture laboratory in my department before this field had achieved its present importance."

By 1965 Tomatis was studying neonatal responses to carcinogen exposure. In 1967, he joined the World Health Organization's (WHO) newly established cancer agency, IARC in Lyon, France. There he formed the Unit of Chemical Carcinogenesis, concentrated on planning and implementing primary prevention of cancer through the identification of carcinogens. To date some 100 Monographs covering well over 1,000 agents have provided objective expert evaluation of the totality of evidence on the carcinogenicity of agents, mixtures, and their exposure circumstances.

== IARC tenure ==
Their first volume of the IARC Monographs in 1972 had instantaneous and enduring impact throughout the world. In fact, IARC quickly became known predominantly for the IARC Monographs. They came to be seen as one of two 'gold standard' carcinogenicity programmes (the other being the US NTP's animal testing program, so IARC's is the only one that evaluates the totality of evidence). Peers have said of them: "To [maintain] the series for 20 years at such a high level is an unprecedented achievement" and: "...A box of jewels of the knowledge of mankind on chemical carcinogenesis."

The success of the IARC Monographs rested in part in the impartiality process initiated by Tomatis and his staff, who for each Monograph created working groups of independent scientists with deep knowledge of chemical carcinogenesis, to evaluate all available information on an agent; emphasizing their impartiality and transparency. Their conclusions were thus reliable enough to base government decisions on the primary prevention of cancer. Indeed, an agent's IARC classification as a carcinogen has been the basis of innumerable actions and proposals (not all successful) to stop and reduce exposure to chemicals.

In January 1982, in recognition of his outstanding career and contributions in understanding cancer causation and prevention, Tomatis was elected by the WHO member nations as the second director of IARC. He was reelected, serving as director for a full 12 years until retirement in December 1993. Throughout his tenure at IARC, Tomatis and the international IARC staff developed a mutual respect and appreciation for each other, unified in promoting the agency's mission of improving public health through primary disease prevention.

== Later career ==
Upon retirement from IARC/WHO, he served as scientific director of the Institute of Child Health “Burlo Garofolo” in Trieste, Italy, from 1996 to 1999.

Later in 1999, Tomatis joined the National Institute of Environmental Health Sciences (NIEHS) in North Carolina. Under the International Scholar Program, Tomatis worked at NIEHS for six summers. Tomatis became Chairman of the Scientific Committee of the ISDE - International Society of Doctors for the Environment (Arezzo, Italy). His vast experience and expertise in this field prompted him to take politically courageous positions on certain topics, as on waste incineration: "It is dubious that new generations may forgive us for this environmental suicide."

Tomatis was fluent in Italian, French, English, and German.

He died on 21 September 2007 in Lyon.

As of 2013, he is survived by his wife, Delia, in Trieste; and their son, Paolo, who lives and works between Switzerland and Italy. (The primary source for this section is Reference #1.)

== Published tributes from peers ==
“On Friday, 21 September 2007, in Lyon, France, we lost a great human being, a staunch advocate for public health, a thorough and delving scientist, and a humanitarian par excellence. Lorenzo Tomatis, MD, above all, was a learned teacher and creative innovator. His accomplishments are legion, and his far-reaching impact on human health, including the well-being of future generations, will be impossible to replace. Tomatis was clearly a true pioneer and admired leader in primary disease prevention. He stands tall among other giants and trailblazers of environmental health science and public health advocacy including Cesare Maltoni, Norton Nelson, David Rall, and Irving Selikoff. At the same time, Tomatis was respected, admired, and loved by his colleagues and fellow public health advocates as a man whose warmth, humor, strength, and sweetness were as compelling as his command of science.”

“Renzo’s name and scientific prestige are intimately linked to the International Agency for Research on Cancer (IARC) programme on the Monographs on the evaluation of carcinogenic risk of chemicals to man, three volumes of which have been prepared every year since 1972 and whose 100th volume (for a total of well over one thousand agents) is expected for 2009. (...) When the Monograph programme started, forty years ago, three ideas of Renzo were revolutionary: evaluating scientific data meant a multidisciplinary approach by a working group, interpreting findings for the purpose of public health required a major contribution from basic science, and the working group had to explain his rationale and the sequence of thoughts leading to evaluation in a transparent way, using terms understandable also to the lay people, with no loss of rigour. Absence of conflicts of interest of the members of working groups was crucial but in those days it was implicit and not spelled out”.

“The leading 20th century proponent for primary prevention of environmental cancer was Dr. Lorenzo Tomatis, the former Director of the International Agency for Research on Cancer and founder of the IARC Monographs program (…) eminent scientist, scholar, teacher, humanitarian, and public health champion--and includes many perspectives that he promoted throughout his career, with original quotations from some of his scientific writings on primary prevention of environmental cancer. Any attempt by us to simply summarize his views would only detract from the power and logic of his language. "Cancer still remains a mainly lethal disease. Primary prevention remains the most relevant approach to reduce mortality through a reduction in incidence".

"ABSTRACT Lorenzo Tomatis [1929-2007] devoted his private and professional life to the betterment of mankind. As a physician, scientist, and humanitarian he championed against the plight of social injustice and promoted the obvious benefits of primary prevention of diseases compared to treatments that prevent or delay disease progression, especially occupational cancers. An avowed student and scholar of literature, the arts, the history of medicine and science, and chemical carcinogenesis, he believed in and wrote about these issues throughout his storied life. Some of his achievements, with excerpts from his writings, especially on primary prevention and on social injustice, are highlighted herein."
