= Linda Birnbaum =

American toxicologist

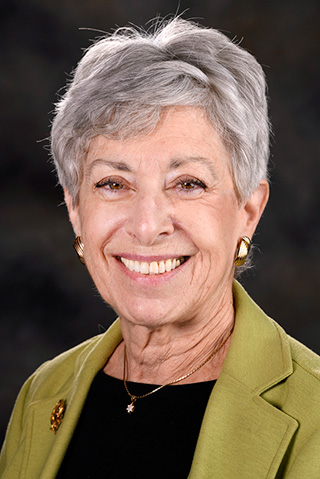
- Born: December 21, 1946 (age 79); Passaic, New Jersey
- Citizenship: U.S.A
- Education: University of Illinois at Urbana-Champaign
- Spouse: David Birnbaum
- Awards: Was elected to the Institute of Medicine in October 2010, as well as to the Collegium Ramazzini; Distinguished Alumna Award from the University of Illinois; 2013 Homer N. Calver Award from the American Public Health Association
- Scientific career
- Fields: Toxicology, microbiology
- Workplaces: National Institute of Environmental Health Sciences
- Thesis: Localization, enrichment and in vitro transcription of the ribosomal RNA genes in Escherichia coli (1972)

Linda Silber Birnbaum is an American toxicologist, microbiologist and the former director of the National Institute for Environmental Health Sciences, as well as the National Toxicology Program, positions she held from January 18, 2009 until October 3, 2019. Since 2020 she has served as Scholar In Residence in the Environmental Sciences and Policy Division of the Nicholas School of the Environment of Duke University. Birnbaum also is an adjunct professor at the University of North Carolina at Chapel Hill School of Public Health and a member of the editorial board of Environment International. She is also an adjunct professor of epidemiology at the Yale School of Public Health.

== Education ==
Birnbaum, a native of New Jersey, attended Benjamin Franklin Junior High School in Teaneck, New Jersey, where she became interested in science because she was a cheerleader, and her cheerleading coach was also her science teacher: "I was a cheerleader, and that positive reinforcement made it okay to like science," she recalled in an interview with Scientific American. Birnbaum received her B.S. in biology from the University of Rochester and her M.S. and PhD degrees in microbiology from the University of Illinois at Urbana-Champaign.

== Career ==
Birnbaum, prior to becoming the director of the NIEHS and NTP, worked at the National Toxicology Program as a senior staff fellow, then as a research microbiologist, and then as a group leader for the Chemical Disposition Group. Birnbaum then began a stint at the Environmental Protection Agency, where she directed the largest agency focused on environmental health research for 19 years. She has also served as the past president of the Society of Toxicology. After she became director of the NIEHS, she declared that she "plan[s] to create a holistic approach that can deal with the biggies, from complex mixtures of toxic chemicals to climate change." She reiterated her commitment to addressing the effects of global warming on human health before the Copenhagen Summit that November. She singled out ozone and black carbon as examples of pollutants with serious adverse health effects. Birnbaum retired as directory of NIEHS and NTP on October 3, 2019, but continues to perform laboratory research part-time at the institute.

== Research ==
Birnbaum has authored over 600 peer-reviewed publications. Her research focuses on the pharmacokinetic behavior of environmental chemicals and their health effects. She is well known for her research on endocrine disruptors, particularly dioxins, polychlorinated biphenyls (PCBs) and polybrominated diphenyl ethers (PBDEs).

== Views on endocrine disrupting chemicals ==
Birnbaum's position on the safety of dioxins and PCBs has been described as "in the middle", although she has expressed concern about the safety of polybrominated diphenyl ethers, and contends that they may be linked to "impaired reproductive function, altered neurological development, obesity, and diabetes." She has also said that the traditional concept of a dose-response relationship may not always hold true and that some chemicals can have serious adverse effects at very low doses. However, she has also dismissed concerns about the dangers of Styrofoam, saying that levels of styrene that leach from styrofoam containers into food "are hundreds if not thousands of times lower than have occurred in the occupational setting." She has described the research about bisphenol A leaching out of plastic when the plastic is heated as "somewhat concerning", and has said that she no longer microwaves food in plastic.

In 2013, Birnbaum published an article in Trends in Endocrinology and Metabolism which contended that diseases that are becoming more common, such as prostate cancer, must be caused by environmental factors rather than genetic ones. This paper prompted two Republican congressmen, Paul Broun and Larry Bucshon, to write a letter to the National Institutes of Health in which they contended that some of her "statements sound less like a presentation of scientific data and more like an opinion."

== Awards and honors ==
Birnbaum was elected to the Institute of Medicine in October 2010, and received the Collegium Ramazzini award. She received a Distinguished Alumna Award from the University of Illinois and an honorary Doctor of Science from the University of Rochester, and received the Homer N. Calver Award from the American Public Health Association in 2013. In 2016, Birnbaum received the North Carolina Award, the highest civilian honor bestowed by the U.S. State of North Carolina. In 2022, she was elected a Fellow of the American Association for the Advancement of Science.
