= David Muller =

American physician (born 1964)

- Born: April 18, 1964; Tel Aviv, Israel
- Education: Johns Hopkins University, NYU
- Known for: Co-founder, Global Health Center, Visiting Doctors Program
- Scientific career
- Fields: Medical Education

David Muller (born April 18, 1964) is an American physician who in 1996 co-founded the Mount Sinai Visiting Doctors Program (VDP), a program of Mount Sinai Medical Center's Departments of Medicine and Geriatrics. He is Dean for Medical Education and the Marietta and Charles C. Morchand Chair in Medical Education at the Icahn School of Medicine at Mount Sinai in New York City and Associate Professor of both Medicine and Medical Education.

As of 2020, Muller is senior advisor and co-founder (with Ramon Murphy and Philip J. Landrigan) of The Arnhold Global Health Institute, a division of The Mount Sinai Medical Center dedicated to finding evidence-based solutions to global health problems.

== Biography ==
Muller was born in 1964 in Tel Aviv, Israel. He graduated from Johns Hopkins University in 1986 with a BA and earned his M.D. from the New York University School of Medicine in 1991. His postdoctoral training included an internship and residency in internal medicine at The Mount Sinai Medical Center, where he was Chief Resident from 1994 to 1995.

== Career ==
Muller joined the faculty at the Icahn School of Medicine at Mount Sinai in 1993. In 2004, he was named associate professor of medicine; in 2005 he was named dean and associate professor of medical education. In September, 2005, he was named Chairman of the Department of Medical Education. In that role he addressed prevention of suicide, racism and curtaining debt among medical students.

=== Visiting doctors program ===
The Visiting Doctors Program, co-founded by Muller, is one of the first and largest in-home care programs for the elderly.

The VDP serves approximately 1,000 homebound elderly patients annually and trains approximately 200 medical students, residents, and fellows annually in the provision of house calls and home care. As of 2011, it was the largest academic physician home visiting program in the country, and in 2022 its physicians made 6,000 home visits.

== Honors, awards and societies ==
Muller is a fellow of the New York Academy of Medicine, the Association of American Medical Colleges, Physicians for Social Responsibility, Physicians for a National Health Program, and member of the American College of Physicians. He is a national board member of Compassion & Choices, and board member of the Susan and Norman Ember Family Foundation and the Atran Family Foundation. He received the AAMC Spencer Foreman Award for Outstanding Community Service in 2009.

== Publications ==
- Haglund, ME; Rot, M; Cooper, NS; et al. (February 2009). "Resilience in the third year of medical school: a prospective study of the associations between stressful events occurring during clinical rotations and student well-being". Acad Med. 84: 258–68. doi:10.1097/ACM.0b013e31819381b1. PMID 19174682.
- Muller, D (July 2008). "Trial by fire: in memoriam". Ann. Intern. Med. 149: 60. PMID 18591639.
- Muller, D (2007). "GOMER". Health Aff (Millwood). 26: 831–5. doi:10.1377/hlthaff.26.3.831. PMID 17485763.
- Smith, KL; Ornstein, K; Soriano, T; Muller, D; Boal, J (August 2006). "A multidisciplinary program for delivering primary care to the underserved urban homebound: looking back, moving forward". J Am Geriatr Soc. 54: 1283–9. doi:10.1111/j.1532-5415.2006.00835.x. PMID 16914000.
- Muller, D (2005). "Do NOT Resuscitate". Health Aff (Millwood). 24: 1317–22. doi:10.1377/hlthaff.24.5.1317. PMID 16162579.
- Feigelson, S; Muller, D (September 2005). ""Writing About Medicine": an exercise in reflection at Mount Sinai (with five samples of student writing)". Mt. Sinai J. Med. 72: 322–32. PMID 16184296.
- Rhodes, R; Cohen, D; Friedman, E; Muller, D (2004). "Professionalism in medical education". Am J Bioeth. 4: 20–2. doi:10.1162/152651604323097673. PMID 15186679.
- Smith, L; Muller, D; Feit, E (1997). "Internal Medicine Subspecialty Training: Negative Impact of the Timing of the Application Process". Academic Medicine. 72 (2): 152–154.
- Adler, L; Sidlow, R; Muller, D. "Practicing Medicine Under the Influence of the Pharmaceutical Industry". Mount Sinai J of Med.
- Boal, J; Muller, D (1998). "The role of physician house calls in comprehensive ambulatory care". Ambul Outreach: 6–7. PMID 10346595.
- Muller D, Boal J: Serving Patients Well Means Acknowledging and Supporting Their Home Caregivers, Oncology Times. Volume 22, Number 1. January 2000.
