= Selikoff Centers for Occupational Health =

Occupational health clinics

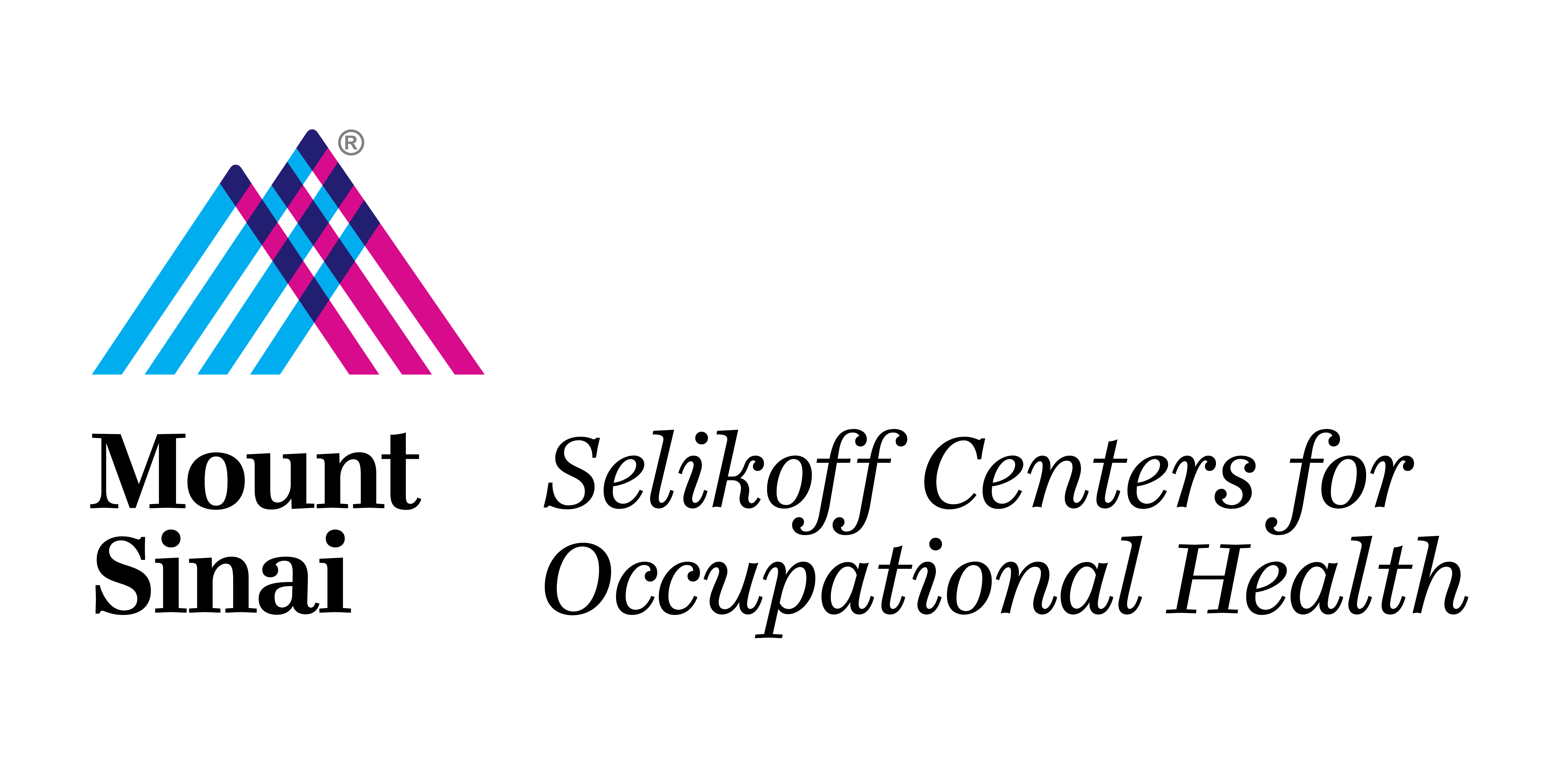
Primary Logo for the Selikoff Centers for Occupational Health

The Mount Sinai Selikoff Centers for Occupational Health are a set of occupational and environmental health clinics that focus on the prevention, diagnosis, and treatment of workplace injuries and illnesses. Significant injuries and illnesses that are treated at the clinical centers include (yet are not limited to) occupational lung cancers, manganese/silica/lead exposures, and asbestos-related illness, which was the career-long research of Dr. Irving Selikoff, the centers' inaugural director. The Selikoff Centers for Occupational Health's multidisciplinary health care team includes physicians, nurse practitioners, industrial hygienists, ergonomists, social workers, and benefits specialists, who are "leaders in the prevention, diagnosis and treatment of workplace injuries and illnesses," and provide comprehensive patient-centered services in New York City and Lower Hudson Valley. The clinical centers are located within the Icahn School of Medicine at Mount Sinai under the Division of Occupational and Environmental Medicine.

The Selikoff Centers for Occupational Health also partner with employers and unions to assess and reduce risk factors in all work environments. Their aim is to establish comprehensive occupational health and safety programs designed to encourage a safe, healthful, and productive workplace. The centers participate in and host events, both for national and international audiences, including the World Trade Health Program Symposium of 2016, an annual Manganese Conference, and the 25th Occupational Health Clinic Network to discuss international workplace health. With a focus on prevention, the Selikoff Centers for Occupational Health strive to keep workers healthy and their workplaces safe.

The Division of Occupational and Environmental Medicine at the Icahn School of Medicine at Mount Sinai, is also home to the New York and New Jersey Education and Research Center. The research center offers programs in Occupational Medicine, Industrial Hygiene, as well as continuing education, referring patients in need of treatment or services, and those of the general population interested in occupational health and safety, to the Selikoff Centers for Occupational Health.

== History ==
Dr. Irving Selikoff founded and became the director of the Environmental and Occupational Health Division of The Mount Sinai Hospital in New York City in 1966, which at the time was the United States' first hospital division dedicated to the field of occupational health and safety. His work on asbestos and the conditions workers were exposed to on their jobs also contributed to the creation of the Occupational Safety and Health Administration (OSHA), as well as the National Institute for Occupational Health and Safety (NIOSH). After Selikoff's death, the division expanded to include the "Irving J. Selikoff Center for Occupational and Environmental Medicine," which today is named the "Selikoff Centers for Occupational Health".

=== World Trade Center Health Program Clinical Center of Excellence ===
The Selikoff Centers for Occupational Health are also a designated "Clinical Center of Excellence" under the World Trade Center Health Program. This program was established by the James Zadroga 9/11 Health and Compensation Act of 2010 (Zadroga Act) and is administered by the National Institute for Occupational Safety and Health (NIOSH) within the federal Centers for Disease Control and Prevention. The Zadroga Act provides free medical monitoring, treatment, mental health services, and benefits counseling for 9/11 responders and volunteers. The Selikoff Centers for Occupational Health at The Mount Sinai Hospital (Manhattan) is home to the largest World Trade Center (WTC) Health Program Clinical Center of Excellence (CCE) in the New York/New Jersey region.

In 2015 the United States Congress passed a reformed version of the Zadroga Act, which provides lifetime health benefits for the 9/11 first responders and victims.

Research conducted on 9/11 first responders continues to show the need for Medical Screening Programs in the event of disasters.
