= Irving Selikoff =

American physician

Irving J. Selikoff
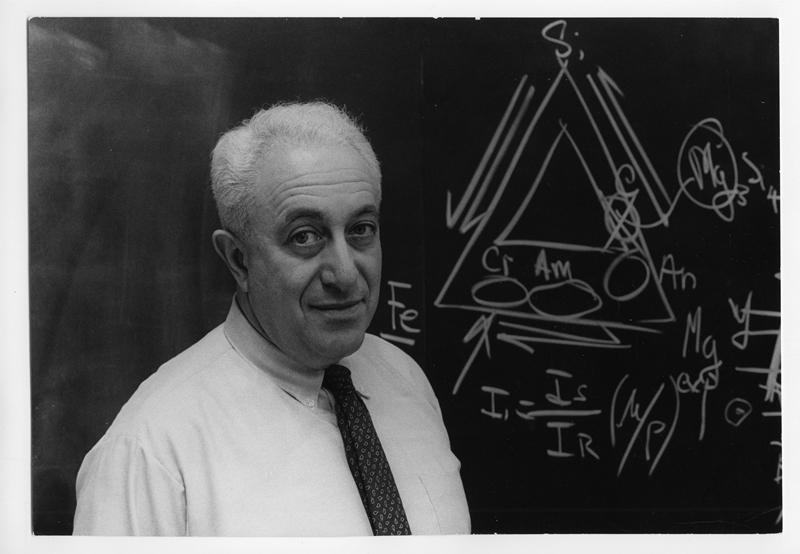
- Born: January 15, 1915; Brooklyn, New York
- Died: May 20, 1992 (aged 77); Ridgewood, New Jersey
- Education: Columbia University, Royal Colleges Scotland
- Known for: Seminal research on asbestos-related illness, his tireless advocacy for worker safety and health protections, and his contributions to the establishment of federal asbestos regulations.
- Scientific career
- Fields: Occupational safety and health

Irving J. Selikoff (January 15, 1915 – May 20, 1992) was a medical researcher who in the 1960s established a link between the inhalation of asbestos particles and lung-related ailments. His work is largely responsible for the regulation of asbestos today. He also co-discovered a treatment for tuberculosis.

== Background ==
Irving J. Selikoff was born to a Jewish family in Brooklyn in 1915. He graduated from Columbia University in 1935 and attended Royal Colleges Scotland for his medical degree, graduating in 1941. He later interned in Newark, New Jersey, and joined the Mount Sinai Medical Center as an assistant in anatomy and physiology.

Selikoff was married to Cecelia Shiffrin.

== Occupational Safety and Health ==
In the 1960s, Selikoff documented asbestos-related diseases among industrial workers. He found that workers exposed to asbestos often had scarred lung tissue 30 years after exposure. His research is credited with having pressured the Occupational Safety and Health Administration (OSHA) to limit workplace exposure to asbestos.

In the 1950s, Selikoff had opened a general-medicine practice called the Paterson Clinic in Paterson, New Jersey. A few years later, the Asbestos Workers Union asked him to add their membership to his practice. He agreed, and business picked up noticeably. In a few years, however, Selikoff noticed surprising events; several new cases of pleural mesothelioma were diagnosed in a year—the expected incidence was about 5/100,000. (The new cohort (asbestos workers) were still a small fraction of the clinic's patient list, but this small group faced grave and novel risks.)

This anomaly led Selikoff into an examination of the relation between asbestos exposure and mesothelioma. He became aware of hundreds of articles previously published on this issue. He engaged in additional studies of groups of asbestos workers, in particular shipyard workers including those at the Long Beach Naval Shipyard. By 1965, he had conducted various studies, published several articles, conducted special scientific symposia, and been interviewed by The New York Times. Each of these raised public awareness of the issue, which had been known to the occupational health community but which had not yet reached widespread public awareness. One of the most well-known and important was the international conference on the "Biological Effects of Asbestos" under the auspices of the renowned New York Academy of Sciences. The results of these presentations were publiced in Volume 132 of the Annals of the New York Academy of Sciences published in 1965.

He has received awards from the American Public Health Association, the New York Academy of Sciences, and the American Cancer Society. He was also awarded the Albert Lasker Award for Clinical Medical Research in 1955. In 1982 he co-founded the Collegium Ramazzini along with Cesare Maltoni and other scientists. He wrote more than 350 scientific articles and two books, edited 11 books and founded two journals. He was the former head of the American Thoracic Society, the Collegium Ramazzini and New York Academy of Medicine. He was a consultant to the World Health Organization, the National Cancer Institute and other agencies, businesses and unions.

U.S. Representative Carolyn B. Maloney presented a Congressional Record tribute in honor of Dr. Selikoff in October 2015. The tribute was presented at the Icahn School of Medicine at Mount Sinai and is on display at the Mount Sinai Selikoff Centers for Occupational Health.

Prior to Selikoff's publications in this area, the US "had been the world's greatest consumer of asbestos." Selikoff's efforts to publicize his research and that of others placed him at the center of controversies surrounding asbestos. In efforts to protect the industry, criticisms were made of Selikoff exaggerating the risks of asbestos and even committing medical fraud. However, most of these claims were inspired by the asbestos industry or its sympathizers, "and for much of his career he was the victim of a sustained and orchestrated campaign to discredit him. The most serious criticisms usually more accurately describe his detractors than Selikoff himself".

=== Mount Sinai and the Selikoff Centers for Occupational Health ===
In 1966 Selikoff founded and became the director of the Environmental and Occupational Health Division of Mount Sinai Hospital in New York, the nation's first hospital division dedicated to the field. He retired as division director at Mount Sinai in 1985 but remained active in research. After his death, it was renamed the "Irving J. Selikoff Center for Occupational and Environmental Medicine" in his honor, and subsequently named "Selikoff Centers for Occupational Health".

== Irving J. Selikoff Award and Lecture ==
The Irving J. Selikoff Award and Lecture was instituted in 1993 by the Collegium Ramazzini. The award is given periodically to a scientist or humanist whose studies and achievements have contributed to the protection of workers' health and the environment.

Recipients of this award include:

- 1995 – Professor Cesare Maltoni
- 2006 – Professor Yasunosuke Suzuki
- 2007 – Dr. Morando Soffritti
- 2008 – Dr. Philip J. Landrigan
- 2009 – Dr. Stephen M. Levin

== Death ==
Selikoff continued to research the effects of asbestos up to the age of 75. A resident of Ridgewood, New Jersey, he died on May 20, 1992, at the age of 77 from cancer at The Valley Hospital in Ridgewood.
