= Stephen M. Levin =

American doctor (1941–2012)

Stephen M. Levin (October 16, 1941 – February 7, 2012) was the medical director of the Mount Sinai Irving Selikoff Center for Occupational Health, a professor of occupational medicine at the Mount Sinai School of Medicine and the co-director of the World Trade Center Worker and Volunteer Medical Screening Program. He graduated from Wesleyan University and New York University School of Medicine,

He was recognized in the field of occupational medicine, particularly for his work on behalf of 9/11 workers and those injured by asbestos in Libby, Montana.

== Career ==
Levin was born and raised in Philadelphia to working-class parents; his father was a carpenter, and his mother was a hospital worker. He graduated from the New York University School of Medicine in 1967. Levin then practiced general medicine in Pottstown, Pennsylvania for a decade. After completing his training in occupational medicine, he joined the faculty at Mount Sinai, where he spent the remainder of his career, eventually becoming a full professor in 2011.

Levin became the medical director of the Mount Sinai Selikoff Center in 1987. He was involved in the occupational medicine teaching program for medical students and residents, and his research interests included asbestos-related diseases, other occupational lung diseases, and heavy metal toxicity.

- Levin consulted for the New York State, New Jersey, and New York City Departments of Health regarding the health hazards of environmental pollutants.
- In the 1990s, Levin advocated for federal and New York State authorities to require respirators and vacuum hoses to protect bridge workers from lead poisoning.
- In 2000 and 2004, Levin's research and testimony assisted in the conviction of Joseph Thorn, his son Alexander, and Raul Salvagno, owners of asbestos abatement companies in New York. The Salvagnos secretly co-owned a lab that produced 75,000 fraudulent laboratory analysis results on asbestos levels.
- Levin was one of the two primary investigators for a project on asbestos exposure among electrical power generation workers in Puerto Rico.
- Levin was also the primary investigator for a project in Libby, Montana, a mining town where thousands of workers and residents had been exposed to asbestos-contaminated vermiculite ore.

== World Trade Center workers ==
Days after the World Trade Center attacks, Levin and his colleagues began planning what would become the clinic for WTC responders. A study by the clinic three years later documented that ninety percent of the 10,116 firefighters and other responders reported an acute cough within the first 48 hours. The clinic, which received more than $12 million from the government, screened and treated more than 20,000 workers and released over a dozen studies. One 2006 study showed that approximately 30% of the 12,000 patients screened suffered from chronic asthma and bronchitis, and 17% suffered from PTSD and depression. Levin contributed to the passage of the James Zadroga 9/11 Health and Compensation Act, legislation designed to ensure that the 9/11 first responders receive basic medical necessities as a result of their toxic exposures.

== See also ==
- Official Stephen M. Levin MD memorial website
- Obituary, The Lancet, March 31, 2012
- Stephen M. Levin honored with Selikoff award, Collegium Ramazzini (scroll down)
- New York Daily News, Health and Compensation Act, February 9, 2012]
- Asbestos Disease Awareness Organization video honoring Stephen Levin on YouTube
- NYNJERC 30th Annual Scientific Meeting presentation on Historical Aspects of Asbestos on YouTube
