= Véronique L. Roger =

French cardiologist and epidemiologist

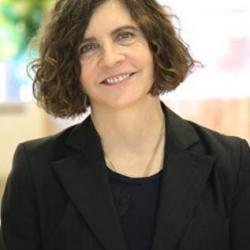
- Education: Sorbonne University; University of Minnesota
- Scientific career
- Fields: Cardiology, epidemiology, phenomics
- Workplaces: Mayo Clinic; National Heart, Lung, and Blood Institute

Véronique L. Roger is a French cardiologist and epidemiologist. She is a senior investigator and chief of the laboratory of heart disease phenomics at the National Heart, Lung, and Blood Institute.

== Life ==
Roger received a medical degree in 1986 from Sorbonne University and a Master in Public Health in Epidemiology at the University of Minnesota in 1996. After training in cardiology at the Mayo Clinic, she joined the faculty in 1992 and became professor in medicine in 2002 and epidemiology in 2006. At the Mayo Clinic, Roger served in various leadership positions including chair of the department of health sciences research and member of the Mayo Clinic board of governors and board of trustees. She chaired the Epidemiology Council of the American Heart Association 2018-2020 and was recognized as the American Heart Association Distinguished Investigator in 2019.

Roger is a senior investigator and chief of the laboratory of heart disease phenomics at the National Heart, Lung, and Blood Institute (NHLBI). Her work is the epidemiology of heart diseases, and their occurrence and outcomes in the community. As a physician-scientist, Roger has deployed, directly and through collaborations, multidisciplinary methods including epidemiology, outcomes and health care delivery analyses, behavioral sciences and the use of electronic health records in population research applied to case ascertainment, risk prediction and pragmatic trials.

She is a fellow of the American Heart Association.
