= Philip J. Landrigan =

American epidemiologist and pediatrician

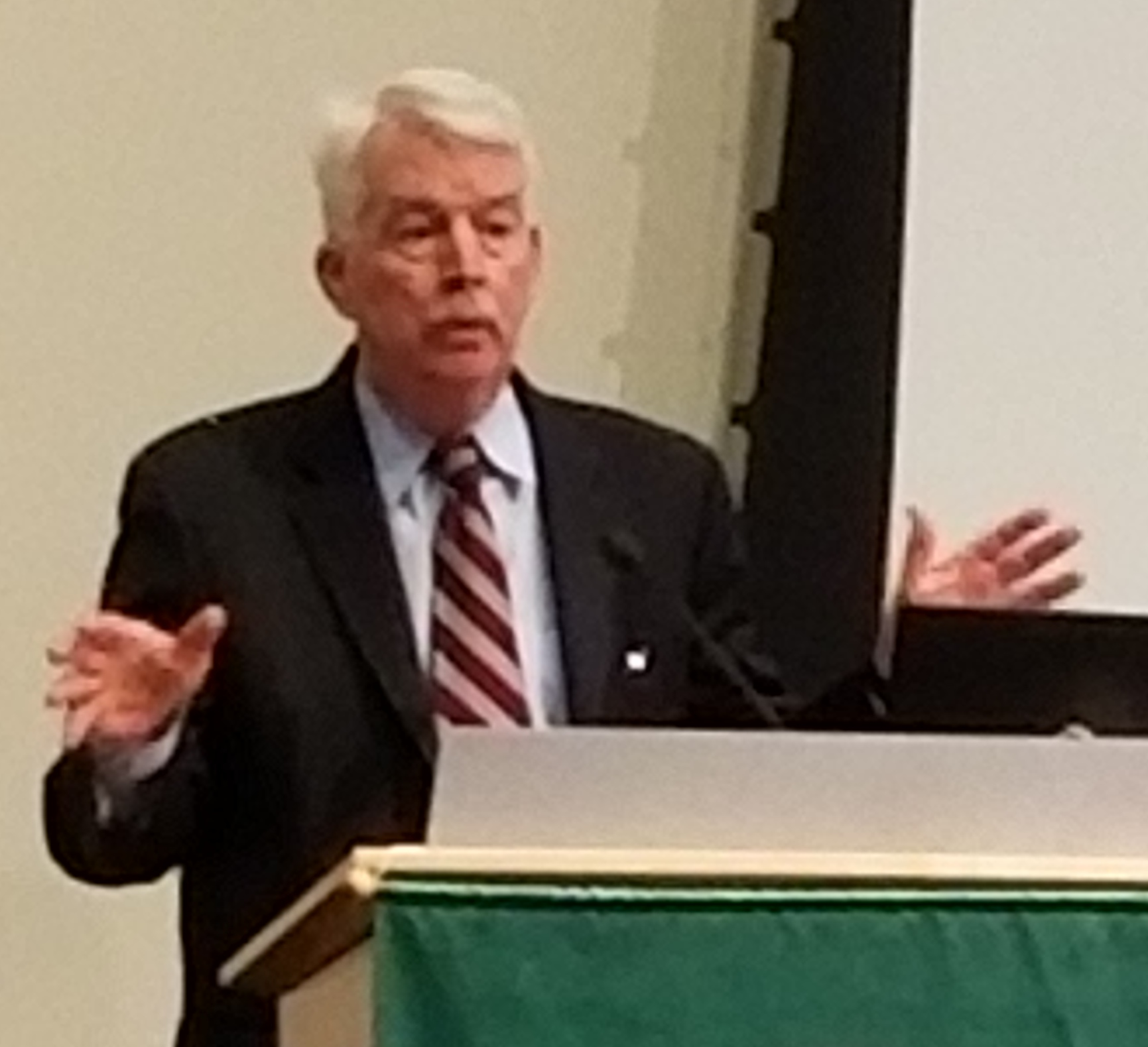
- Born: June 14, 1942 (age 84); Boston, Massachusetts, U.S.
- Education: Boston Latin School; Boston College; Harvard Medical School
- Scientific career
- Fields: epidemiology
- Workplaces: Icahn School of Medicine at Mount Sinai; University of Cincinnati; Boston Children's Hospital

Philip John Landrigan (born June 14, 1942), is an American epidemiologist and pediatrician. He has campaigned against substances in the environment that are harmful to children, such as lead and asbestos. He is also concerned with environmental pesticides.

His work has been recognized by national non-profit organization Healthy Child Healthy World (Lifetime Achievement Award) and the U.S. Environmental Protection Agency (Child Health Champion Award).

His books include Raising Healthy Children in a Toxic World: 101 Smart Solutions for Every Family and, with Herbert Needleman, Raising Children Toxic Free: How to Keep Your Child Safe From Lead, Asbestos, Pesticides and Other Environmental Hazards. He has published over 500 scientific papers.

He was formerly the Director of the Children's Environmental Health Center and the Ethel Wise Professor and Chair of the Department of Preventive Medicine at Mount Sinai Medical Center in New York City.

In 2018, he became the founding director of Boston College's Global Public Health Program and the Global Pollution Observatory within the Schiller Institute for Integrated Science and Society.

== Early life and education ==
Landrigan graduated Boston Latin School in 1959 and Boston College in 1963. He received his medical degree from Harvard Medical School in 1967 and completed his internship at Cleveland Metropolitan General Hospital and his residency at Boston Children's Hospital.

His post-graduate education included the London School of Hygiene and Tropical Medicine and his completion, with distinction, of a Master of Science in Occupational Medicine at the University of London.

== Career ==
=== Public health advocate ===
Landrigan is an expert in the field of public health. He has focused on reducing the level of children's exposure to lead and pesticides and has participated in the World Health Organization's global campaign to eradicate smallpox. He was also a central figure in developing the National Children's Study and in the medical and epidemiological studies that followed the destruction of the World Trade Center on September 11, 2001. Additionally, from 1995 to 1997, Landrigan served on the Presidential Advisory Committee on Gulf War Veteran's Illnesses, and, in 1997 and 1998, served as Senior Advisor on Children's Health to the Administrator of the U.S. Environmental Protection Agency, where he helped establish the Office of Children's Health Protection.

He has been awarded the Meritorious Service Medal of the US Public Health Service and is a frequent consultant to the World Health Organization, which called Landrigan's work "instrumental in passing the Food Quality Protection Act of 1996."

In 2005, Landrigan, along with Drs. Ramon Murphy and David Muller, founded the Global Health Center, a division of the Mount Sinai Medical Center dedicated to finding evidence-based solutions to global health problems.

==== Lead ====
In the early 1970s, Landrigan took on ASARCO, a smelting company and one of the largest employers in El Paso, Texas. In testing the blood of children attending schools near ASARCO's El Paso smelting plant, Landrigan concluded that 60% of children living within one mile of the smelter had elevated blood lead levels and that even small amounts of lead exposure lowers a child's IQ. In a later study (2002), Landrigan correlated childhood lead exposure and lifetime earning potential, concluding that current levels of lead exposure in the United States amount to an aggregate income loss of over $40 billion a year.

Landrigan and his studies played a key role in the government mandate phasing out lead components from gasoline, beginning in 1975, and the federal ban on lead paint in 1978 – culminating in an 88% drop in lead levels in American children by 2005.

==== Pesticides ====
Beginning in 1988, at the request of U.S. Senator Patrick Leahy of Vermont, Landrigan led a 5-year study for the National Academy of Sciences to examine whether the accepted standard for pesticide exposure – which was intended to protect a 150-pound adult – was adequate to protect the health of children. In 1993, the Landrigan Committee released a report entitled Pesticides in the Diets of Infants and Children, which was among the first to demonstrate that children are uniquely susceptible to adverse effects of pesticides. The report called for standards ten times more stringent than those in effect at time of publication.

==== Asbestos ====
On February 11, 2002, Landrigan testified before the House Committee on Education and the Workforce on the impacts of the September 11 attacks on the health of children. Landrigan addressed the issue of asbestos particles found in the air:

"Almost no data exist on the possible long-term consequences of low-level asbestos in early childhood. Causes of malignant mesothelioma have, however, been reported in the grown children of asbestos workers who were exposed to take-home asbestos; among non-working women in the asbestos mining townships of Quebec who were exposed in the community; and among long term residents of a community near an asbestos-cement plant in Northern Italy."

In October 2001, New York Magazine noted disagreement between Landrigan and the EPA over the dangers posed by asbestos particles found in the air immediately after the September 11 attacks. While generally agreeing that significant risk was to the rescue workers alone, Landrigan disagreed with the EPA that tiny asbestos particles were too small to be considered dangerous, saying, "It's been substantiated by 30 or 40 years of research that the smaller fibers are the ones that can penetrate most deeply into the lungs."

=== Military service ===
From 1996 to 2005, Landrigan served in the Medical Corps of the United States Naval Reserve, retiring at the rank of Captain. He continues to serve as Deputy Command Surgeon General of the New York Naval Militia. From 2000 to 2002, he served on the Armed Forces Epidemiological Board.

He received Navy & Marine Corps Commendation Medals in 2002, 2003, and 2005, the Secretary of Defense Medal for Outstanding Public Service in 2002, and the National Defense Service Medal in 2003.

== Awards ==
- 1973 Volunteer Award, United States Department of Health, Education, and Welfare
- 1976 Career Development Award, United States Public Health Service
- 1978 Group Citation as Member of Beryllium Review Panel, United States Public Health Service
- 1985 Meritorious Service Medal, United States Public Health Service
- 1985 Annual Honoree, New York Committee for Occupational Safety and Health
- 1987 Elected to membership, Institute of Medicine, National Academy of Sciences
- 1993 Harriet Hardy Award, New England College of Occupational and Environmental Medicine
- 1995 William Sidell Presidential Award, United Brotherhood of Carpenters
- 1995 Herbert L. Needleman Medal and Award for Scientific Contributions and Advocacy on Behalf of Children, American Public Health Association
- 1995 Occupational Health and Safety Award, International Association of Fire Fighters
- 1996 Broad Street Pump Award in Environmental Health, Physicians for Social Responsibility
- 1998 Environmental Achievement Award, New Jersey Environmental Federation Certificate of Recognition
- 1998 Vernon Houk Award, International Society for Occupational and Environmental Health
- 1999 Earth Day New York, Award for Excellence in Environmental Medicine
- 1999 Award for Advocacy on Behalf of the Health of Children, Mothers & Others for a Livable Planet
- 1999 Katherine Boucot Sturgis Award, American College of Preventive Medicine
- 2000 William Steiger Memorial Award, American Conference of Governmental Industrial Hygienists
- 2001–2006 Top Doctor. Preventive Medicine. New York Metropolitan Area and United States, Castle Connolly Ltd
- 2002 Haven Emerson Award, Public Health Association of New York City
- 2002 Jacobi Medallion, Mount Sinai School of Medicine
- 2002 James Keogh Award, National Institute for Occupational Safety and Health
- 2003 David P. Rall Award for Advocacy in Public Health, American Public Health Association
- 2003 Jorma Rantanen Award, Finnish Institute for Occupational Health
- 2005 Rachel Carson Environmental Award, National Nutritional Foods Association
- 2005 Health Achievement in Occupational Medicine Award, American College of Occupational and Environmental Medicine
- 2005 Humanities Award for Children's Health Protection, Huntington Breast Cancer Action Coalition
- 2005 J. Lester Gabrilove Award, Mount Sinai School of Medicine
- 2005 Super Hero Award for Children's Health, Federated Conservationists of Westchester County
- 2006 Child Health Champion Award, U.S. Environmental Protection Agency
- 2006 Lifetime Achievement Award, Children's Health Environmental Coalition
- 2008 Irving J. Selikoff Award, Collegium Ramazzini
- 2008 Boston College Alumni Award for Professional Excellence
- 2008 Edith Macy Award for Distinguished Service, Westchester Children's Association
- 2008 Healthy Schools Hero Award, Healthy Schools Network, Inc.

== Books ==
- Landrigan PJ, Selikoff IJ (editors). Occupational Health in 1990s: Developing a Platform for Disease Prevention. Annals NY Academy of Sciences: 572 1-296, 1989. ISBN 0-89766-523-6
- Landrigan PJ. (Chair): Environmental Neurotoxicology. Commission on Life Sciences, National Research Council. Washington: National Academy Press, 1992. ISBN 0-309-04531-2
- Landrigan PJ (Chair): Pesticides in the Diets of Infants and Children. Committee on Pesticides in the Diets of Infants and Children. Board on Agriculture, and Commission on Life Sciences. National Research Council. Washington: National Academy Press, 1993. ISBN 0-309-04875-3
- Landrigan PJ, Needleman HL: Raising Children Toxic Free. How to Keep Your Child Safe From Lead, Asbestos, Pesticides and Other Environmental Hazards. New York: Farrar, Straus and Giroux, 1994. ISBN 0-380-72577-0
- Leigh JP, Markowitz S, Fahs M, Landrigan P: Costs of Occupational Injuries and Illnesses. Ann Arbor: The University of Michigan Press, 2000. ISBN 0-472-11081-0
- Landrigan PJ, Needleman HL, Landrigan M. Raising Healthy Children in a Toxic World: 101 Smart Solutions for Every Family. Emmaus PA: Rodale Press, 2002. # ISBN 0-87596-947-X
- Mehlman MA, Bingham E, Landrigan PJ, Soffritti M, Belpoggi F, Melnick RL. Carcinogenesis Bioassays and Protecting Public Health. Commemorating the lifework of Cesare Maltoni and colleagues. Annals of the New York Academy of Sciences (Vol. 982), New York, NY. GYAT/B-M Press, 2002. ISBN 1-57331-406-4

== See also ==
- Children's Environmental Exposure Research Study
