= Marcel Kuntz =

French plant biotechnologist

Marcel Kuntz is a French plant biotechnologist who is a Research Director in the Laboratoire de Physiologie Cellulaire Végétale (Laboratory of Plant and Cell Physiology) at the Centre National de la Recherche Scientifique (National Centre for Scientific Research) in Grenoble, France.

== Criticism ==
He is known for his criticisms of the ways that the French government and popular media have exaggerated the risks associated with genetically modified foods. He has documented how public perception of the risks of such foods has diverged significantly from the conclusions that scientists have reached on the topic.

== Award ==
He was a recipient of the Médaille d'Or (Gold Medal) from the Académie d'Agriculture (French Academy of Agriculture) in 2017.
