= National Institute of Environmental Health Sciences =

U.S. health institute

National Institute of Environmental Health Sciences (NIEHS)

Agency overview
- Formed: 1966
- Jurisdiction: Federal government of the United States
- Agency executives: Richard Woychik, Director; Trevor K. Archer, Deputy Director
- Parent department: Department of Health and Human Services
- Parent agency: National Institutes of Health
- Website: www.niehs.nih.gov

The National Institute of Environmental Health Sciences (NIEHS) conducts research into the effects of the environment on human disease, as one of the 27 institutes and centers of the National Institutes of Health (NIH). It is located in Research Triangle Park in North Carolina, and is the only primary division of the NIH located outside of the Washington metropolitan area.

As an institute of the National Institutes of Health, the NIEHS supports environmental health research with the mission of reducing environmental disease, advancing basic, environmental health and clinical science, and increasing the availability of researcher and worker training.

== Constitution ==
The National Institute of Environmental Health Sciences is a part of the National Institutes of Health, which is in turn a part of the United States Department of Health and Human Services (HHS).

The mission of the NIEHS is to "reduce the burden of human illness and disability by understanding how the environment influences the development and progression of human disease". NIEHS focuses on peer-reviewed basic science, disease-oriented research, global environmental health, clinical research, and multidisciplinary training for researchers.

NIEHS researchers and grantees have shown links between lung cancer and asbestos exposure, the developmental impairment of children exposed to lead and the health effects of urban pollution. The 1994 co-recipient of the Nobel Prize in medicine, Dr. Martin Rodbell, served as Scientific Director of the NIEHS from 1985 to 1989. Later on in 1994, NIEHS scientists assisted in identifying the first breast cancer gene, BRCA1, and, in 1995, identified a gene that suppresses prostate cancer. Work by NIEHS researchers and grantees has resulted in the development of genetically altered mice to improve and shorten the screening of potential toxins and to help develop aspirin-like anti-inflammatory drugs with fewer side effects.

The Institute funds centers for environmental health studies at universities across the United States.

== History ==
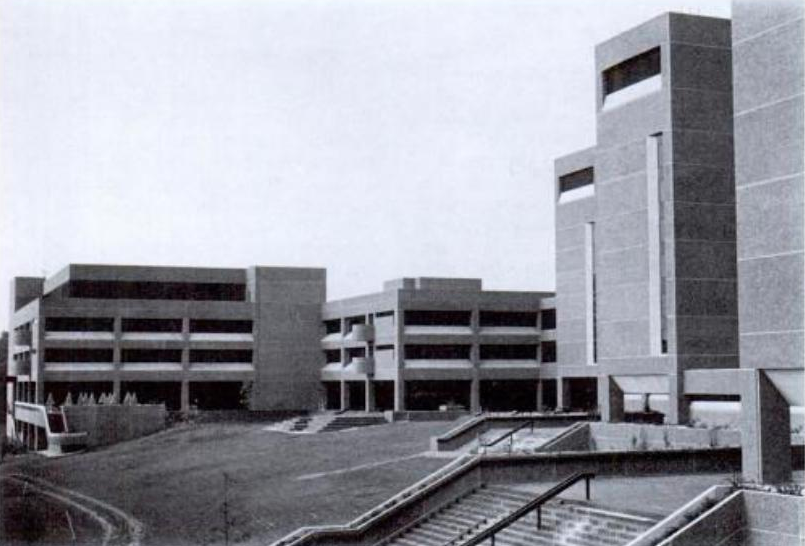
NIEHS facility at Research Triangle Park

In 1966, U.S. Surgeon General William H. Stewart helped to create a Division of Environmental Health Sciences within the NIH. Three years later, the division became its own institute, the National Institute of Environmental Health Sciences. Past directors include Paul Kotin, David Rall, Kenneth Olden, David A. Schwartz, and Linda Birnbaum.

== Directors ==
The following persons served as NIEHS director:

No.	Portrait	Directors	Took office	Left office	Refs.
1		Paul Kotin	November 1, 1966	February 28, 1971	
2		David Rall	March 1, 1971	October 1, 1990	
acting		David G. Hoel	October 2, 1990	June 1991	
3		Kenneth Olden	June 1991	2005	
4		David A. Schwartz	May 22, 2005	August 19, 2007	
acting		Samuel H. Wilson	August 20, 2007	January 15, 2009	
5		Linda Birnbaum	January 16, 2009	October 3, 2019	
acting	Richard Woychik	Richard Woychik	October 4, 2019	June 6, 2020	
6	Richard Woychik	Richard Woychik	June 7, 2020	October 10, 2025	
7		Kyle M. Walsh	October 10, 2025	incumbent	

== Organization ==
The NIEHS is one of 27 institutes and centers of the National Institutes of Health (NIH), which is a component of the Department of Health and Human Services (HHS). NIEHS is located on 375 acres (1.52 km^{2}) in Research Triangle Park (RTP), North Carolina. Its current director is Dr. Richard Woychik, who is also concurrently the director of the National Toxicology Program. The deputy director is Dr. Trevor Archer. The director of the NIEHS reports to the director of the NIH, of which the NIEHS is a member agency.

NIEHS is composed of:

- Division of Intramural Research (DIR), which is research done at NIEHS
- Division of Extramural Research and Training, which funds research conducted elsewhere
- Division of the National Toxicology Program, which is an interagency program headquartered at NIEHS
