= Integrated risk information system =

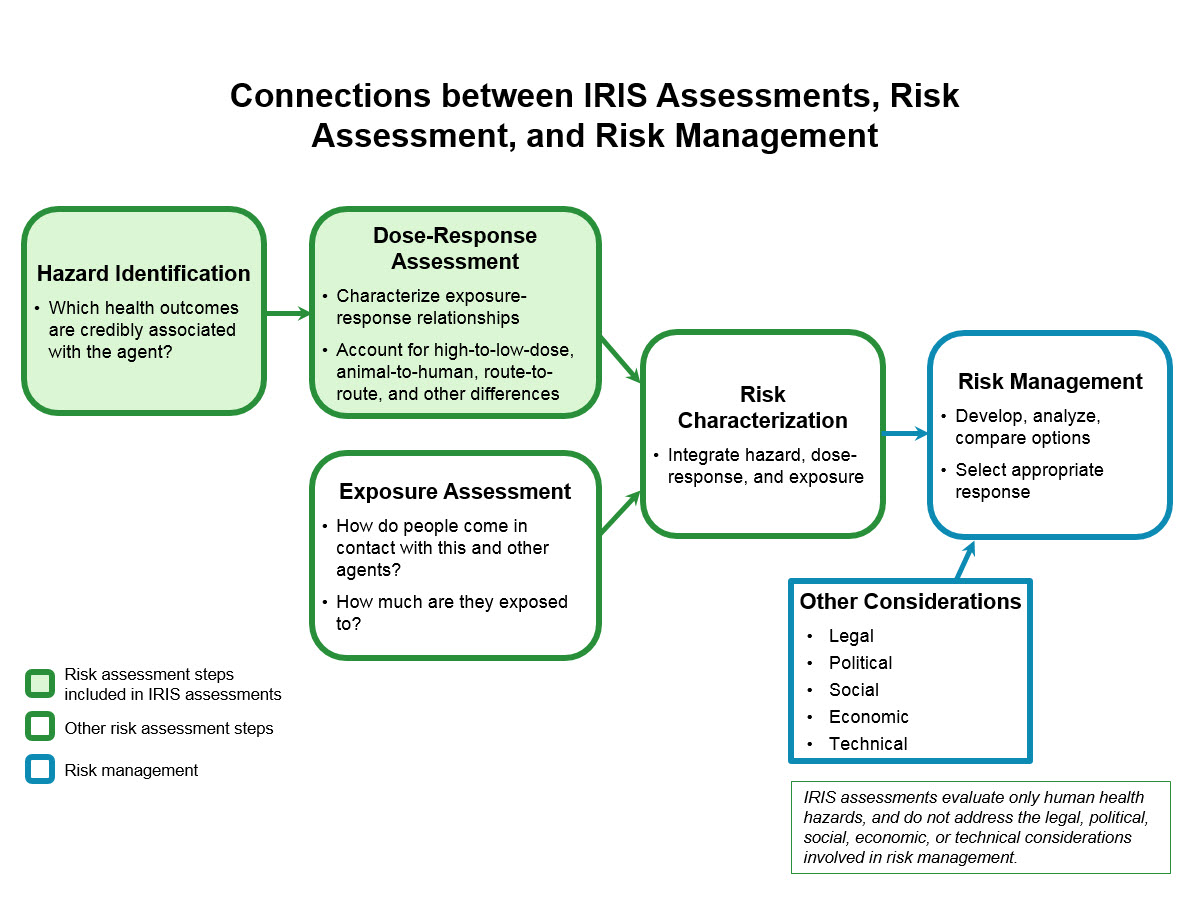
Connections between IRIS Assessments, Risk Assessment and Risk Management

The Integrated Risk Information System (IRIS) is an environmental assessment program operated by the U.S. Environmental Protection Agency (EPA). The IRIS program focuses on risk assessment, not risk management (those decision processes involving analysis of regulatory, legal, social and economic considerations related to the risks being studied).

== History ==
In the 1980s, the IRIS program established a database of human health assessments about the impacts of chemicals in the environment. EPA created the database to provide a consistent approach to risk assessment practices across the various environmental laws that the Agency implemented and enforced.

The program was created by the EPA in 1985. Initially, the program aimed to foster consistency in the agency's chemical toxicity evaluation. The IRIS database was first made publicly available in 1987. In 1996, the EPA implemented a new process for building intra-agency consensus and improving efficiency within the IRIS database. The same year, the EPA introduced the IRIS Toxicological Review, which presented the first agency-wide health assessment document. In March 1997, the IRIS database was uploaded to the internet. In 2004, the IRIS process was changed to add an interagency review led by the Office of Management and Budget (OMB) and to emphasise outside peer review of IRIS assessments.

The IRIS program was once again revised in April 2008. Among other things, the newly revised program provided an opportunity for research to close data gaps on mission-critical chemicals. The following year, the process was changed to streamline a review schedule so that most assessments would be posted to the IRIS database within two years of the start date. In 2013, the EPA announced that it would enhance the IRIS process to improve transparency, efficiency, and the scientific foundation of the agency's assessments. That same year, the program's Toxicological Review documents were restructured to make them clearer, systematic and consistent. In December 2015, the IRIS program released its first-ever multi-year agenda, identifying the top chemical assessments it would focus on in the following years.

In 2016, the EPA faced criticism for changing the risk description of Ethylene Oxide from "probably carcinogenic to humans" to "carcinogenic to humans," based on Ethylene Oxide's IRIS value. The American Chemistry Council found shortly after that the EPA had grossly misestimated the IRIS value, finding it to be 19,000 times lower than natural levels of EO in the human body, and comparably lower than the levels of EO in ambient air. Consequently, in 2017, the Texas Commission on Environmental Quality (TECQ) performed its own analysis of the cancer risk proposed by EO and found it initially to be 65 times lower than the IRIS value, before releasing a later assessment with a value 3,500 times lower in 2019. In 2022, despite calls to review the IRIS value or to adopt the TECQ risk value, the EPA elected to continue to use the 2016 IRIS value and decline the TECQ proposed value.

== IRIS process for developing human health assessments ==
The IRIS process takes about 26 to 39 months to complete, depending on the complexity of the assessment, with the review part of the process taking between 15 and 24 months. The process begins with what the EPA refers to as the "Planning and Scoping" stage. During this stage, risk assessors will consider the scope, possible legal limitations, and how the information will be used. After the Planning and Scoping Stage, the EPA uses a seven-step risk assessment review program that starts with a draft assessment and ends in publication on an IRIS website. The review process proceeds as follows:

1. Complete draft IRIS assessment. The IRIS program conducts literature search and critical study selection, develops evidence tables that summarize the results of these studies. EPA publicly releases assessment protocols which presents the methods for conducting the systematic review. These protocols include a literature search strategy and study selection criteria. It is also during this stage that the agency identifies hazards, selects studies for dose-response assessment, and derives toxicity values.
2. Internal agency review. The IRIS program shares its draft assessment with the EPA's program and regional offices, identifies any scientific issues, and determines external peer review scope and guidelines. This process typically lasts 60 days.
3. Interagency science consultation. Other federal agencies including the Executive Office of the President (i.e. OMB and the Council on Environmental Quality) review the IRIS draft assessment. EPA then provides a specific date for receiving written comments, convenes a meeting to address the issues raised in the comments, and revises the draft accordingly.
4. Independent expert peer review. The IRIS program publicly releases its draft assessment on its website as part of an external review process, after which a meeting is held to allow for peer review charge and scientific questions. The IRIS staff may then revise its assessment draft and submit the draft to an external peer review panel organized by a contractor or by the EPA's Science Advisory Board.
5. Revising assessment. The IRIS program evaluates the recommendations provided by the peer review panel and all public comments. IRIS also prepares a written response-to-comment document. After revising its initial assessment, IRIS staff developed a document describing the disposition of peer review and public comments and provided the document as an appendix to its final assessment.
6. Final agency review and interagency science discussion. After completing revisions, the IRIS program shares its assessment with the EPA's program and regional offices for final review. For the interagency part of this stage, EPA provides federal agencies with a final draft of its assessment and related materials, and provides a specific date for receiving written comments. During this stage, the EPA's internal review and the interagency review occur simultaneously.
7. Final Assessment. The IRIS program completes its assessment and posts the final product on the IRIS website along with related material, including the Toxicological Review document, IRIS summary and appendices.

== Relationship with environmental impact assessments ==
The IRIS opens a draft review for experts to review and assess the course of action needed for the corresponding issue. Legislative bodies take action after assessing the risk and the level of action required to be taken for the corresponding issue. The relationship between IRIS and an environmental impact assessment (EIA) is that IRIS provides a database used in the EIA process. External parties (scientists, scholars, legislators) make decisions based on the IRIS database. Support for these decisions comes from backing from programs such as Strategic environmental assessment (SEA) and OMB.
