= National Toxicology Program =

United States government program

Agency overview
- Formed: 1978
- Agency executive: Dr. Richard Woychik, Director, NIEHS & NTP
- Parent agency: United States Department of Health and Human Services, National Institute of Environmental Health Sciences
- Child agencies: Office of the Report on Carcinogens; Interagency Center for the Evaluation of Alternative Toxicological Methods
- Website: ntp.niehs.nih.gov

The National Toxicology Program (NTP) is an inter-agency program run by the United States Department of Health and Human Services to coordinate, evaluate, and report on toxicology within public agencies.

The National Toxicology Program is headquartered at the National Institute of Environmental Health Sciences (NIEHS). The NIEHS Director, currently Richard Woychik, also concurrently serves as NTP Director.

== History ==
The program was established in 1978 by Joseph A. Califano Jr., then the United States secretary of health, education, and welfare (today known as the secretary of health and human services). The program arose from congressional concerns about the health effects of chemical agents in the environment. In October 1981, Secretary Richard S. Schwiker granted permanent status to the program.

== Interagency Center for the Evaluation of Alternative Toxicological Methods ==
The NTP Interagency Center for the Evaluation of Alternative Toxicological Methods (NICEATM) supports the development and evaluation of new, revised, and alternative methods for chemical safety testing. Alternative methods are methods for safety testing of chemicals and chemical products that use fewer or no animals or that minimize or prevent animal pain and distress. NICEATM is directed by Dr. Warren Casey, PhD, DABT.

The NIH Revitalization Act of 1993 directed NIEHS to establish criteria for the validation and regulatory acceptance of alternative test methods and a process for their subsequent implementation. This led to the establishment of the Interagency Coordinating Committee on the Validation of Alternative Methods via the ICCVAM Authorization Act of 2000, which stated that ICCVAM would exist as a permanent interagency committee of NIEHS under NICEATM.

In addition to supporting ICCVAM, NICEATM activities include:

- Conducting and publishing analyses and evaluations of data from new, revised, and alternative testing approaches
- Providing information to test method developers, regulators, and regulated industry through its website and other communications and by organizing workshops and symposia on topics of interest
- Providing bioinformatics and computational toxicology support to National Toxicology Program and NIEHS projects, especially those related to Tox21

NICEATM publishes results of its analyses of alternative test methods and approaches in the peer-reviewed literature and presents at meetings of the Society of Toxicology and the World Congress on Alternatives and Animal Use in the Life Sciences.

== Office of the Report on Carcinogens ==
The United States federal government's NIEHS National Toxicology Program's Office of the Report on Carcinogens is responsible for publishing a Report On Carcinogens, first issued in 1980.

The latest edition is the 15th Report, issued in 2021. The 14th Report, published in 2016, contains "248 listings of agents, substances, mixtures, and exposure circumstances that are known or reasonably anticipated to cause cancer in humans." This edition added seven newly reviewed listings, of which the only synthetic chemical was trichloroethylene.
