= De Morbis Artificum Diatriba =

1700 book by Bernardino Ramazzini

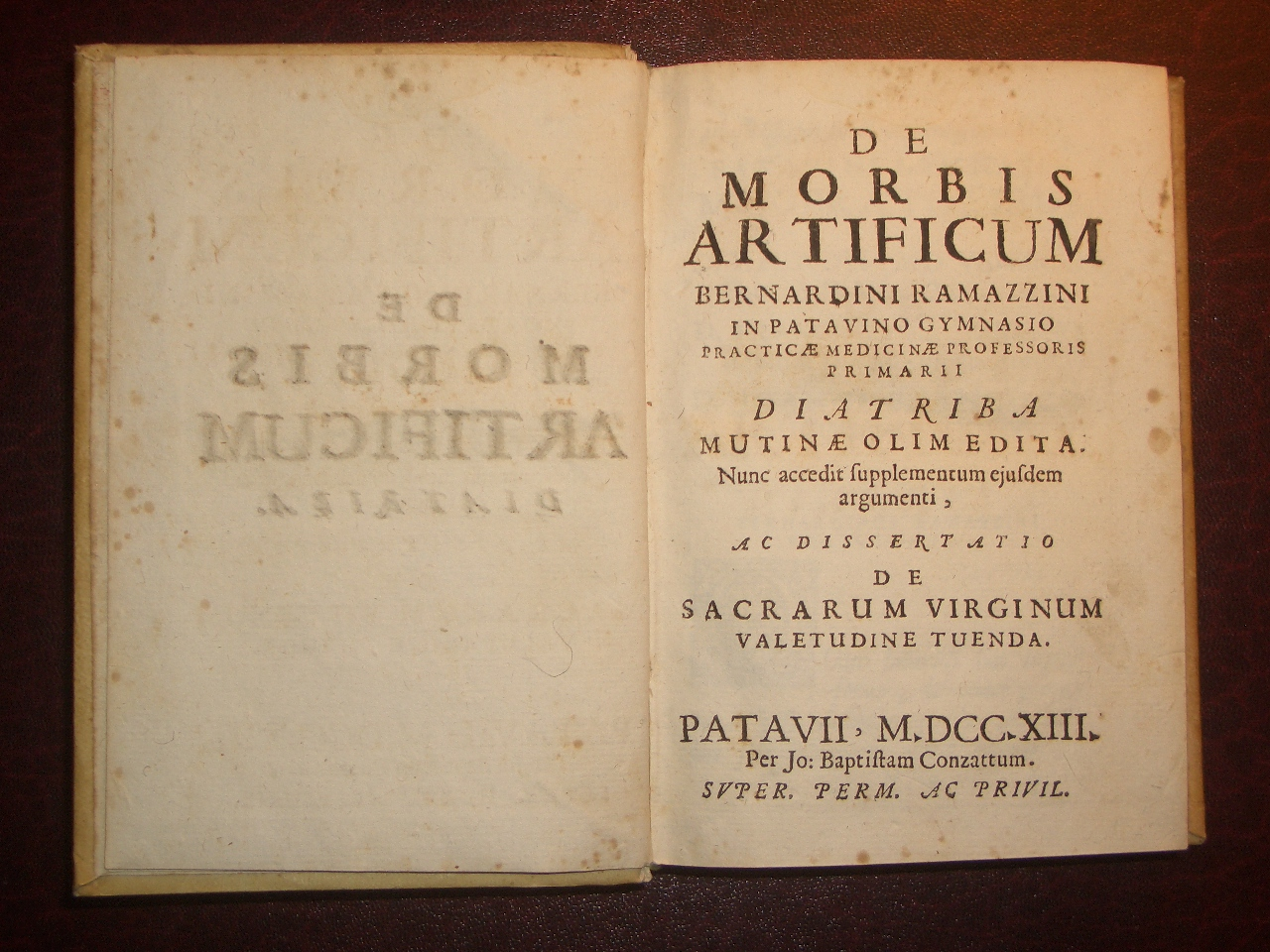
- Frontpage of the 1713 edition of the Diatriba
- Author: Bernardino Ramazzini
- Language: Latin
- Subject: Occupational medicine
- Publisher: Giovanni Battista Conzatti
- Publication date: 1700 (1st ed.); 1713 (2nd ed.)
- Publication place: Duchy of Modena and Reggio (1st ed.); Republic of Venice (2nd ed.)

De Morbis Artificum Diatriba (English: Discourse on the Diseases of Workers) is the first book written specifically about occupational diseases and work-related risk prevention. Written in Latin by Italian physician Bernardino Ramazzini (1633–1714), it is a founding work of occupational medicine and remains one of its most seminal, continuing to influence the field to this day. It was first published in Modena in 1700 while Ramazzini was a professor of Practical Medicine at the University of Padua; its second, definitive edition was printed in Padua in 1713 while he was a professor of Theoretical Medicine at the university.

For this work, Ramazzini is considered the father of occupational medicine. The book is also a seminal work in the field of occupational health. Cited by Adam Smith, Karl Marx, and Cotton Mather, it has been acknowledged or quoted directly in virtually all notable works on occupational medicine of the 19th and 20th centuries.

It describes between 53 and 69 different professions; includes analytical and methodological approaches to diagnose and prevent diseases associated with them; and details health hazards posed by chemicals, dust, metals, repetitive or violent motions, odd postures, and other disease-causative agents encountered by workers in them.

The breadth of occupations Ramazzini covers is so great that there remains even today a high chance that one might inadvertently address an occupation-related illness already touch on by Ramazzini. A paper discussing grain itch indicated that the book described the same disorder, and it was proposed that farmer's lung should be renamed Ramazzini's disease.

== Contents ==
The book describes Ramazzini's observations made as a doctor and as an investigator of the territory, combining clinical remarks of the patient-worker with the description of working conditions and techniques, and related risks to health. In 54 chapters the book reports health risks faced by workers in more than one hundred occupations and currently it is considered the first textbook of occupational medicine and a precursor of occupational health.

The Diatriba describes specific disorders in individuals and in groups of workers carrying out the same activity. Whereas some clinical pictures deserve only a historical interest, several disorders represent even today a health problem for specific groups of workers. Ramazzini proposed several precautions for the prevention of diseases whose basic idea, mostly based on common sense, was correctly conceived.

=== Musculoskeletal disorders ===
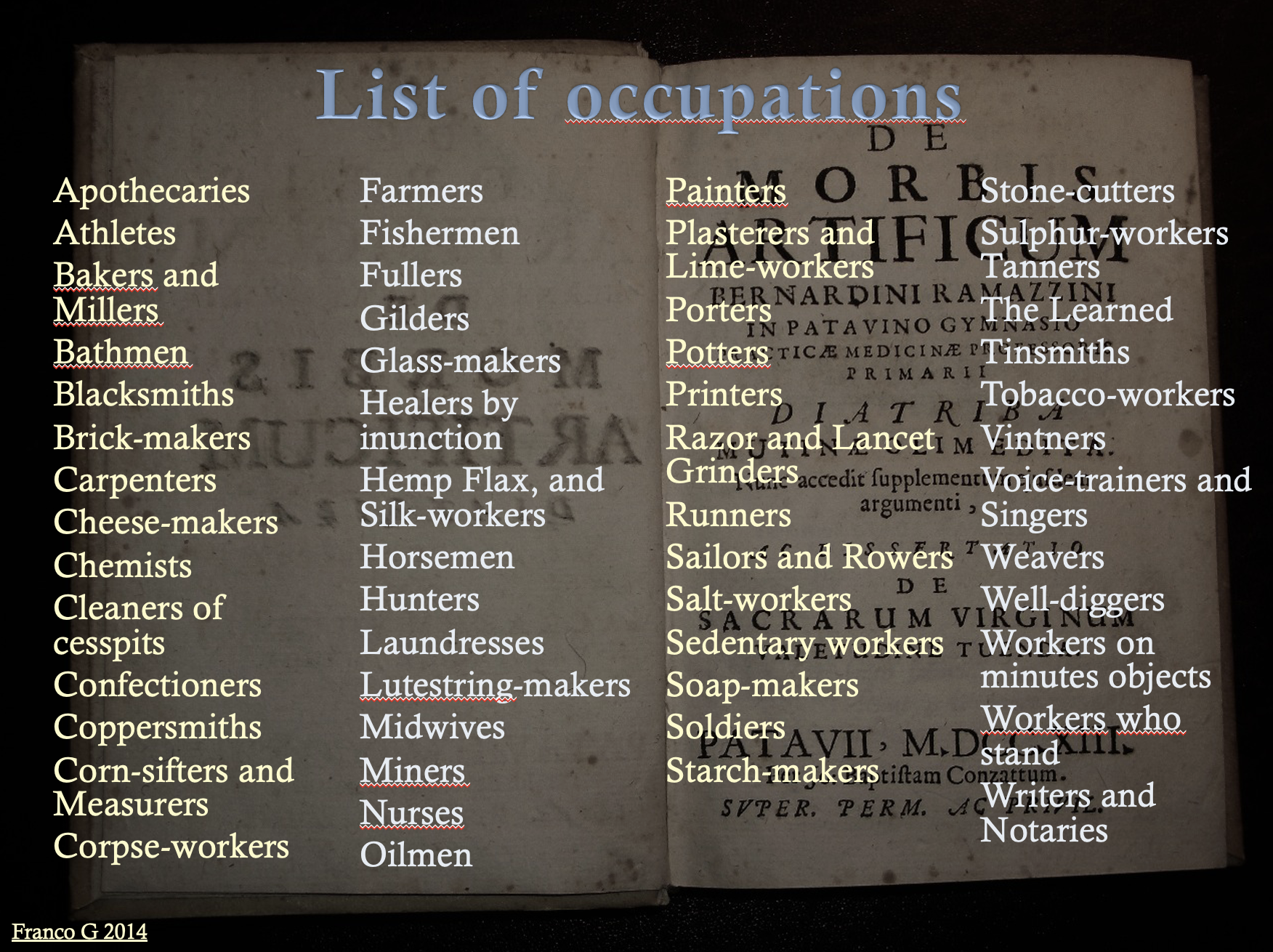
Syllabus artificum de quorum Morbis fit menti. (transl. List of craftsmen whose diseases are mentioned.) It lists 67 employments and working activities.

Much space is dedicated to the discussion of musculoskeletal disorders in workers employed in many jobs. Ramazzini understood that different morbid pictures were associated with postures, movement repetition, weight lifting, muscular load, which today define the ergonomic factors. The Diatriba lists 26 different occupations, from brick-makers to sailors and from printers to writers and notaries, affected by all kinds of musculoskeletal disorders.

=== Stress-related health disorders ===
Ramazzini identified stress-related health disorders associated with circumstances involving high job demands and repetitive job activity. In addition to the continuous sitting responsible for sedentariness issues, he detected in accounting clerks the psychological stress to avoid mistakes or cause loss to their employers and keenly noted that an intense application of the mind harmed those workers.

=== Breast cancer in nuns ===
Ramazzini described consumptive affections mostly in heavy occupations such as miners. However, he also made an explicit reference to tumors. In fact, he reported that breast cancers were very often found in nuns’ breasts more than in any other women. He explained that it might be due to their celibate life. This remark anticipated the observation between nulliparity and hormonal status of women by centuries. For this remark, Ramazzini has been acknowledged as a precursor in the search for the prevention of neoplastic diseases.

=== Sensory system diseases and other disorders ===
He also observed diseases associated with the sensory system such as visual fatigue problems in people who did small objects, deafness among workers exposed to noise, and voice disorders and dysphonia involving intense voice exercise.

The Diatriba reports morbid forms such as dust-related lung problems and serious neurological disorders associated with lead and mercury exposure. It reports still existing clinical pictures and important widespread health problems: bronchopulmonary pictures such as asthma in millers and hypersensitivity pneumonitis, of which he understood the pathophysiological mechanisms. The book describes risks from excessive exposure to heat and sunlight and health troubles arising from nightwork. It was the first book to report headaches resulting from exposure to chemical substances.

=== Environmental pollution ===
The Diatriba reports an episode of chemical pollution associated with pathological pictures affecting the inhabitants who lived near a polluting site thus revealing that Ramazzini’s attention was not limited to the working environment but extended to the context of life. The episode is one of the earliest examples of chemical pollution associated with an increase in disease. Reporting of unexpected health damages represented yesterday and represents today, an alarm signal of a potential environmental problem of interest for public health. These observations have been valued as they anticipated modern epidemiological tools in work and living environments.

=== Inequalities and vulnerability ===
Much attention was given to inequality and above all to the vulnerability that today remains a topic of great concern. He described health-related problems in ethnic minorities of that time and women. Women were usually employed in different occupations entailing exposure to dangerous materials and ergonomically challenging works, in agriculture and transport of stones and bricks, although they were committed to the production of commodities such as pasta, bread and clothing items.

=== Risk prevention and health protection ===
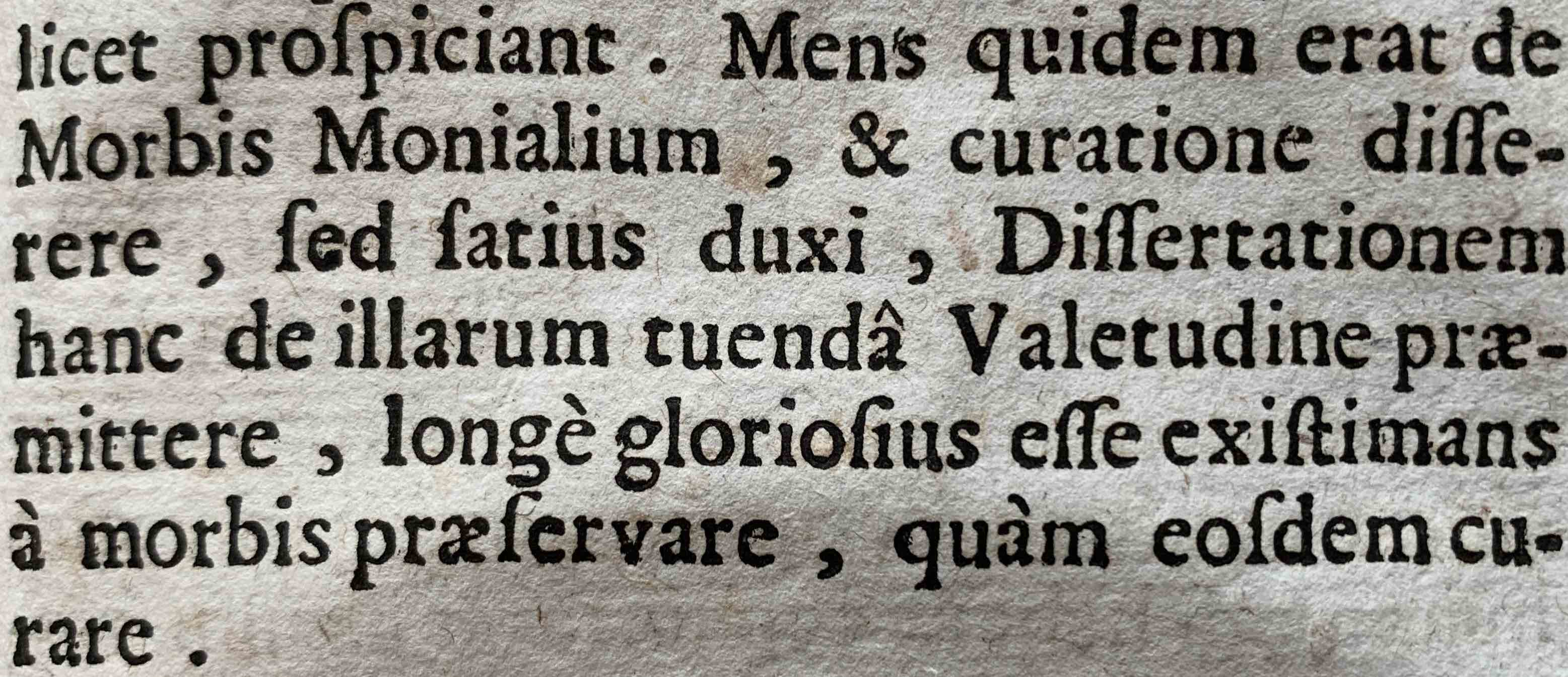
Ramazzini argued "it is more convenient to prevent diseases than to treat them". (Note: Mens quidem erat de Morbis Monialium, & curatione differere; sed satius duxi, Dissertationem hanc de illarum tuenda Valetudine præmittere, longe gloriosius esse existimans a morbis præservare, quam eosdem curare. (The intention was undoubtedly to take into account the illnesses and the care of the nuns, but I thought it would be preferable to include an essay on the protection of their health, believing that it is more convenient to prevent diseases than to treat them.) (2nd ed., 1713.))

The Diatriba goes well beyond the identification of health risks in workplaces and description of the work-related diseases and also deals with risk communication, risk prevention and health promotion. It foreshadowed many interventions that are well established today: removing the polluted air emitted from the minerals and carrying out the work in spacious places, interrupting the prolonged posture, reducing the working time to limit the exposure to hazards, using personal protective tools.

His main precept was given in 1711 in his Oratio xiii. De contagiosa epidemia. On that occasion, he pronounced the well-known precept "far better to prevent than to cure". This expression evokes the phrase he used some years later in the dissertation on nuns' health that appeared in the 1713 edition of the Diatriba. He explained, with other words, the idea already expressed earlier, preaching this new message fully and with courageous perseverance.

== Editions and translations ==
Several editions and translations of the Diatriba have been published since its first edition in 1700 and its second in 1713. It was translated into Italian, English, French, Dutch, and German in the 18th century, and further translations in Italian, French, and German were published in the 19th century. It was published in Japanese, Russian, and Swedish in the 20th century. The Japanese translation was published as an eleven-part series from January 1962 through February 1963, with the final version coming out in 1979. The Swedish translation appeared in 1991, its publication supported by the Swedish Work Environment Fund.

Wilmer Cave Wright's 1940 English translation of the 1713 edition, published by the University of Chicago Press, helped rekindle interest in the book. During her tenure at Bryn Mawr College, she was induced to produce the translation by Haven Emerson; it was the second book for the New York Academy of Medicine's History of Medicine Series, the first being Wright's translation of one of Girolamo Fracastoro's works.

Just 300 copies of this edition were produced, and it was out of print by 1942. Despite Emerson having implored them to do so in 1949, the New York Academy of Medicine would not reprint it until 1964, with some of its extant copies, of which 3,000 were produced in total, still being held by them as of 1996.

Arguably the greatest edition of the book was published in 1983 by Gryphon Editions as part of their Classics of Medicine Library series, putting Ramazzini in the company of others such as William Osler, William Harvey, Rudolf Virchow, Thomas Sydenham, Joseph Lister, Harvey Cushing, and Ignaz Semmelweis.

A 1993 edition, based on Wright's translation, was published in Thunder Bay, Canada, by OH&S Press.

== Legacy ==
While introducing a resolution (Note: H.R. 4973) to amend the U.S. Code in 1979 during the 96th United States Congress, George Miller began with a quote from the book: "Tis a sordid profit that's accompanied by the destruction of health."

A rare copy of the first edition can be found on display in Ramazzini Hall, a section of the University of Occupational and Environmental Health in Kitakyushu, Japan.

== Bibliography ==
- Araujo-Alvarez, J. M.; Trujillo-Ferrara, J. G. (2002). "De Morbis Artificum Diatriba 1700–2000" (PDF). Salud Pública de Mexico (in Spanish). 44 (4): 362–370. doi:10.1590/S0036-36342002000400010. eISSN 1606-7916. ISSN 0036-3634. PMID 12216524. Archived (PDF) from the original on 20 June 2023.
- Bisetti, A. (1985). "La pneumopatia dell'agricoltore o malattia di Ramazzini" [Farmer's lung or Ramazzini's disease]. La Medicina del Lavoro. 76 (3): 192–200. PMID 3900662.
- Bode, A.M.; Dong, Z. (2009). "Cancer prevention research - then and now". Nature Reviews Cancer. 76 (9): 508–16. doi:10.1038/nrc2646. PMC 2838238. PMID 19536108.
- Ramazzini, Bernardino (31 January 2010). Carnevale, Francesco; Mendini, M.; Moriani, G. (eds.). Opere mediche e fisiologiche [Medical and physiological works] (in Italian). Verona: Cierre Edizioni. ISBN 978-8883145407.
- Carnevale, F.; Iavicoli, S. (2015). "Bernardino Ramazzini (1633-1714): a visionary physician, scientist and communicator". Occupational and Environmental Medicine. 72 (1): 2–3. doi:10.1136/oemed-2014-102744. PMID 25504887.
- Carnevale, Francesco (3 February 2017). Annotazioni al 'Trattato delle malattie dei lavoratori' di Bernardino Ramazzini [Notes on Bernardino Ramazzini's 'Treatise on Workers' Diseases'] (in Italian). Florence: Edizioni Polistampa. ISBN 978-8859616337.
- Cockayne, Emily (2007). Hubbub: Filth, Noise, and Stench in England, 1600–1770. London: Yale University Press. ISBN 9780300137569.
- Di Pietro, P. (1999). "Bernardino Ramazzini. Biography and bibliography". European Journal of Oncology. 4: 255–317.
- Felton, J. S. (1997). "The Heritage of Bernardino Ramazzini". Occupational Medicine. 47 (3): 167–179. doi:10.1093/occmed/47.3.167. ISSN 0962-7480. PMID 9156474.
- Franco, Giuliano (1999). "Ramazzini and workers' health". The Lancet. 354 (9181): 858–861. doi:10.1016/S0140-6736(99)80042-7. hdl:11380/305091. PMID 10485743.
- Franco, Giuliano (2000). "Ramazzini's "De Morbis Artificum Diatriba" and Society, Culture, and the Human Condition in the Seventeenth Century". International Journal of Occupational and Environmental Health. 6 (2): 80–85. doi:10.1179/oeh.2000.6.2.80. hdl:11380/310385. PMID 10828134.
- Franco, Giuliano; Fusetti, L. (2004). "Bernardino Ramazzini's early observations of the link between musculoskeletal disorders and ergonomic factors". Applied Ergonomics. 34 (1): 67–70. doi:10.1016/j.apergo.2003.08.001. hdl:11380/4642. PMID 14985142.
- Franco, Giuliano (2008). "Ramazzini and workers' voice disorders". Otolaryngology–Head and Neck Surgery. 139 (2): 329. doi:10.1016/j.otohns.2008.05.022. hdl:11380/591531. PMID 18656745.
- Franco, Giuliano (2010). "Work-related musculoskeletal disorders. A lesson from the past". Epidemiology. 21 (4): 577–9. doi:10.1097/EDE.0b013e3181e0c6f4. hdl:11380/645131. PMID 20539112.
- Franco, Giuliano (2011). "Health disorders and ergonomic concerns from the use of microscope: A voice from the past". American Journal of Clinical Pathology. 135 (1): 170–1. doi:10.1309/AJCPUYF00YHFHTHJ. hdl:11380/647790. PMID 21173140.
- Franco, Giuliano (2012). "Bernardino Ramazzini and women workers' health in the second half of the seventeenth century". Journal of Public Health. 34 (2): 305–8. doi:10.1093/pubmed/fds029. hdl:11380/734847. PMID 22467901.
- Franco, Giuliano (2020a). Prevention is Far Better Than Cure. Revisiting the Past to Strengthen the Present: the Lesson of Bernardino Ramazzini (1633-1714) in Public Health. Italy: Youcanprint. ISBN 9788831663021.
- Franco, Giuliano (2020b). "Revisiting the past strengthens the present: Bernardino Ramazzini and the new occupational health". Public Health. 181: 180–1. doi:10.1016/j.puhe.2019.12.016. PMID 32087420.
- Franco, Giuliano (2020c). "The 1711 rinderpest in Bernardino Ramazzini's XIII Oration and the COVID-19 public health emergency: facts and common aspects". La Medicina del Lavoro. 111 (4): 321–325. doi:10.23749/mdl.v111i4.9672. PMC 7809953. PMID 32869768.
- Franco, G. (2021). "Bernardino Ramazzini's De Morbis Artificum Diatriba on Workers' Health-the Birth of a New Discipline". Journal of UOEH. 43 (3): 341–348. doi:10.7888/juoeh.43.341. PMID 34483193.
- Gochfeld, Michael (2005). "Chronologic History of Occupational Medicine" (PDF). Journal of Occupational and Environmental Medicine. 47 (2): 96–114. Bibcode:2005JOEM...47...96G. doi:10.1097/01.jom.0000152917.03649.0e. ISSN 1076-2752. JSTOR 44997408. PMID 15706170. S2CID 35548035. Archived from the original (PDF) on 13 September 2006.
- Galimberti, E.; Manzini, F.; Riva, M. A. (2014). "Bernardino Ramazzini (1633-1714): an often forgotten pioneer in maritime health". International Maritime Health. 65 (1): 41. doi:10.5603/MH.2014.0009. hdl:10281/172016. PMID 24677127.
- Garrison, F. H. (1934). "Life as an Occupational Disease". Bulletin of the New York Academy of Medicine. 10 (12): 679–94. PMC 1965705. PMID 19311939.
- Pagel, J. L. (1891). "Über Bernardino Ramazzini und seine Bedeutung in der Geschichte der Gewerbehygiene". Deutsche Medizinische Wochenschrift (in German). 17: 224–6.
- Pope, Malcolm H. (2004). "Bernardino Ramazzini: The Father of Occupational Medicine". Spine. 29 (20): 2335–2338. doi:10.1097/01.brs.0000142437.70429.a8. ISSN 0362-2436. PMID 15480150.
- Zanchin, G.; Mainardi, F.; Dainese, F.; Maggioni, F. (2004). "Headache among the educated in the century of enlightment" (PDF). The Journal of Headache and Pain. 5 (2): 153–159. doi:10.1007/s10194-004-0086-5.
- Maggioni, F.; Rossi, P.; Zanchin, G. (1995). "Headache Associated with Exogenous Substances - An Idea First Considered in the 18th Century". Confinia Celphalalgica. 4 (2): 67–71.
- Paladino, M. E.; Belingheri, M.; Mazzagatti, M.; Riva, M. A. (2024). "Noise-induced hearing loss in pre-industrial era. Early contributions in "De Morbis Artificum" by Bernardino Ramazzini (1633-1714)". The Journal of Laryngology & Otology. 138 (1): 7–9. doi:10.1017/S0022215123001457. PMC 10772019. PMID 37646190.
- Riva, M. A.; Belingheri, M.; De Vito, G.; Lucchini, R. (2018). "Bernardino Ramazzini (1633-1714)". Journal of Neurology. 265 (9): 2164–5. doi:10.1007/s00415-018-8733-y. PMC 6057829. PMID 29327285.
- Zanchin, G.; Rossi, P.; Maggioni, F.; Isler, H. (1996). "Headache as an Occupational Illness in the Treatise "De Morbis Artificum Diatriba" of Bernardino Ramazzini". Cephalalgia. 16 (2): 79–86. doi:10.1046/j.1468-2982.1996.1602079.x. PMID 8665586. S2CID 8308129.
- Zocchetti, C. (2000). "Bernardino Ramazzini epidemiologo ante litteram" [Bernardino Ramazzini. Ante litteram epidemiologist]. Epidemiologia e Prevenzione. 24 (6): 276–81. PMID 11219205.
