= Occupational medicine =

Medical specialty concerned with the maintenance of health in the workplace

Occupational Medicine
- MeSH: D009787

Occupational Medicine Physician
Occupation
- Names: Physician
- Occupation type: Specialty
- Activity sectors: Medicine

Description
- Education required: Doctor of Medicine (M.D.); Doctor of Osteopathic Medicine (D.O.); Bachelor of Medicine, Bachelor of Surgery (M.B.B.S., MBChB)
- Fields of employment: Hospitals, Clinics, Government Agencies, Corporations,

Occupational and Environmental Medicine (OEM), previously called industrial medicine, (Note: It can be confusing that British English also uses industrial medicine to refer to occupational health and safety and also uses occupational health to refer to occupational medicine. See the Collins Dictionary's entries for industrial medicine and occupational medicine and occupational health.) is a board certified medical specialty under the American Board of Preventative Medicine that specializes in the prevention and treatment of work-related illnesses and injuries.

OEM physicians are trained in both clinical medicine and public health. They may work in a clinical capacity providing direct patient care to workers through worker's compensation programs or employee health programs and performing medical screening services for employers. Corporate medical directors are typically occupational medicine physicians who often have specialized training in the hazards relevant to their industry. OEM physicians are employed by the US military in light of the significant and unique exposures faced by this population of workers. Public health departments, the Occupational Safety and Health Administration (OSHA) and the National Institute of Occupational Safety and Health (NIOSH) commonly employ physicians specialized in occupational medicine. They often advise international bodies, governmental and state agencies, organizations, and trade unions.

The specialty of Occupational Medicine rose in prominence following the industrial revolution. Factory workers and laborers in a broad host of emergent industries at the time were becoming profoundly ill and often dying due to work exposures which prompted formal efforts to better understand, recognize, treat and prevent occupational injury and disease.

More recently occupational medicine gained visibility during the COVID-19 pandemic as spread of the illness was intricately linked to the workplace necessitating dramatic adjustments in workplace health, safety and surveillance practices.

In the United States, the American College of Preventive Medicine oversees board certification of physicians in Occupational and Environmental Medicine

== Mission ==
Occupational medicine aims to prevent diseases and promote wellness among workers. Occupational health physicians must:

- Have knowledge of potential hazards in the workplace including toxic properties of materials used.
- Be able to evaluate employee fitness for work.
- Be able to diagnose and treat occupational disease and injury.
- Know about rehabilitation methods, health education, and government laws and regulations concerning workplace and environmental health.
- Be able to manage health service delivery.

OM can be described as:

work that combines clinical medicine, research, and advocacy for people who need the assistance of health professionals to obtain some measure of justice and health care for illnesses they suffer as a result of companies pursuing the biggest profits they can make, no matter what the effect on workers or the communities they operate in.

== History ==
The first textbook of occupational medicine, De Morbis Artificum Diatriba (Diseases of Workers), was written by Italian physician Bernardino Ramazzini in 1700.

== Notable Occupational Medicine Physicians ==
- Dr. Alice Hamilton
- Dr. Stephen M Levin
- Dr. Archibald Cochrane (Preventative Medicine)

== Governmental bodies ==
=== United States ===
- National Institute for Occupational Safety and Health (NIOSH)
- Occupational Safety and Health Administration (OSHA)

=== Russian Federation ===
Research Institute of Occupational Medicine of the Russian Academy of Sciences (Moscow)

== Non-governmental organizations ==
=== International ===
- International Commission on Occupational Health (ICOH)
- Institute of Occupational Medicine (IOM)

=== Japan ===
- Japan Society of Occupational Health

=== United Kingdom ===
- Faculty of Occupational Medicine

=== United States ===
- American College of Occupational and Environmental Medicine (ACOEM)
- American Osteopathic College of Occupational & Preventive Medicine (AOCOPM)

=== Europe ===
- European Society for Environmental and Occupational Medicine (EOM)

Australasia

- ANZSOM Australia https://www.anzsom.org.au/
- ANZSOM New Zealand https://anzsom.org.nz/

== See also ==
- American Board of Preventive Medicine
- American Osteopathic Board of Preventive Medicine
- Human Intervention Motivation Study
- Industrial and organizational psychology
- National Occupational Research Agenda
- Occupational disease
- Occupational Health and Safety
- Occupational health nursing
- Occupational health psychology
- Occupational Health Science (journal)
- Occupational hygiene
- Occupational Medicine (journal)
- Trauma und Berufskrankheit
