= Norbert Bischof =

Swiss market researcher and politician (1926–2003)

- Born: 21 April 1926; Lucerne, Switzerland
- Died: 2003 (aged 76–77)
- Occupations: Market researcher; educator; politician
- Known for: Pioneer of modern market research in Switzerland
- Spouse: Marlis Bernet

Norbert Bischof (21 April 1926 – 2003) was a Swiss market researcher, educator, and politician, counted among the founders of modern market research in Switzerland.

== Biography ==
Bischof was born on 21 April 1926 in Lucerne, the son of Valentin Bischof, an official at Suva. He married Marlis Bernet, daughter of the dentist Hans Bernet. After attending the gymnasium in St. Gallen, he studied at the University of Fribourg, earning a doctorate in economics in 1950.

From 1950 to 1955 Bischof worked in the accounting department of the Dürsteler company in Wetzikon, and from 1955 to 1959 in market research at A. C. Nielsen in Lucerne. In 1960 he was a co-founder of the Institut für Haushaltanalysen (IHA) in Hergiswil. He held a teaching post in market research and marketing at the University of Fribourg from 1965 to 1972 and served as its administrator from 1972 to 1975. From 1975 to 1978 he was engaged by the Nidwalden Cantonal Bank as a mediator in financially endangered industrial firms, including Schilter AG and Norm AMC, and from 1980 to 1988 he was rector of the vocational school of Nidwalden.

Bischof was a justice of the peace from 1964 to 1972 and a member of the Nidwalden cantonal parliament (Landrat) for the Christian Democratic People's Party (CVP) from 1966 to 1980.

== Bibliography ==
- Bockshorn, no. 52, 1983
