= Matthew Boulton (disambiguation) =

Matthew Boulton (1728–1809) was an English manufacturer and business partner of Scottish engineer James Watt.

Matthew Boulton may also refer to:

== People ==
- Matthew Robinson Boulton (1770–1842), English manufacturer, a pioneer of management and the son of the above
  - Matthew Piers Watt Boulton (1820–1894), British classicist, amateur scientist and inventor, son of Matthew Robinson Boulton
- Matthew Boulton (actor) (1893–1962), British actor
- Matthew Boulton (epidemiologist) (born 1957), American 20th and 21st century epidemiologist

== Schools ==
- Matthew Boulton College, amalgamated into Birmingham Metropolitan College

== See also ==
- Matthew Bolton (born 1979), Australian snooker player
