= American College of Preventive Medicine =

US heatlh organization

The American College of Preventive Medicine
- Formation: 1954
- Headquarters: Washington, D.C.
- President: M. "Tonette" Krousel-Wood, MD, MSPH

The American College of Preventive Medicine (ACPM) is an American non-profit organization focused on practice, research, publication, and teaching of evidence-based preventive medicine. It publishes the American Journal of Preventive Medicine, which is their official journal.

ACPM is a member of the Adult Vaccine Access Coalition (AVAC), the CDC Coalition and the Coalition for Health Funding, and a partner of the National Foundation for Infectious Diseases (NFID).

== Background ==
In 1954, ACPM was established to provide a supportive home for the increasing number of preventive medicine board-certified physicians. Two years later, it became chartered as a non-profit organization.

ACPM has more than 2,700 members who are working worldwide in science research, government and healthcare services. ACPM provides a vibrant platform for knowledge sharing among specialists in preventive medicine, and offers training programs for research, information, and opportunities for ongoing professional growth.

Preventive Medicine is a distinct medical specialty recognized by the American Board of Medical Specialties. A specialist in Preventive Medicine focuses on the health of individuals and defined populations in order to protect, promote and maintain health and well-being, and to prevent disease, disability and premature death. They may be a specialist in Aerospace Medicine, Occupational Medicine, or Public Health & General Preventive Medicine.

=== COVID-19 ===
In the first quarter of 2021, ACPM received an $8,000 grant from Pfizer for a "vaccine confidence PSA".

== See also ==
- American Board of Preventive Medicine
- American Osteopathic Board of Preventive Medicine
