= Bernardino Ramazzini =

Italian physician (1633–1714)

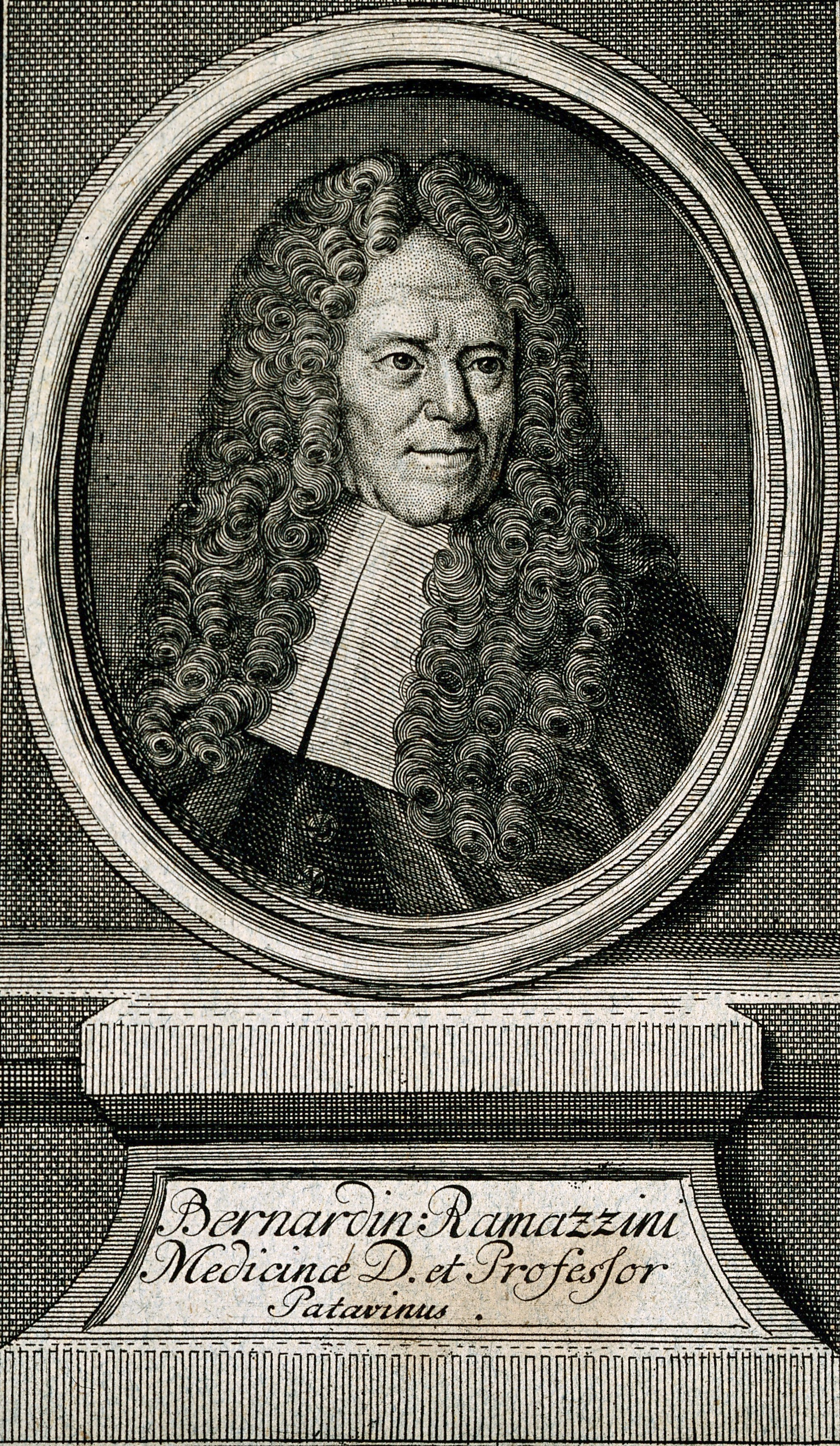
- Bernardino Ramazzini
- Born: 4 October 1633; Carpi, Duchy of Modena and Reggio
- Died: 5 November 1714 (aged 81); Padua, Venetian Republic
- Education: University of Parma
- Known for: cinchona, occupational medicine
- Scientific career
- Fields: medicine
- Workplaces: University of Modena, University of Padua

Bernardino Ramazzini (Italian pronunciation: [bernarˈdino ramat'tsini]; 4 October 1633 – 5 November 1714) was an Italian physician. He has been considered as a founder of occupational medicine with his book on occupational diseases, De Morbis Artificum Diatriba ("Diseases of Workers") published in 1700. Ramazzini, along with Francesco Torti, was an early proponent of the use of cinchona bark (from which quinine is derived) in the treatment of malaria.

== Life ==
Ramazzini was born in Carpi on 4 October 1633 according to his birth certificate. His parents were Bartolomeo Ramazzini and Caterina Federzoni. He studied medicine from the age of 19 at the University of Parma, where his interest in occupational diseases began. He then moved to Rome and attended the lectures of Antonio Maria de Rossi. He practiced medicine in Viterbo. where he suffered from malaria.

== Career ==
He was invited by Marquis Alfonso Molza as court physician to Duke Francis II in 1671. He was made chair of theory of medicine at University of Modena in 1682 alongside Francesco Torti. Here he became interested in the relationships between climate and epidemics. In 1693 he was elected to Caesarean-Leopoldine Academy with the title of Terzo Ippocrate ["Third Hippocrates"]. He then served as professor of medicine at the University of Padua from 1700 until his death. He is often called "the father of occupational medicine".

=== Occupational medicine ===
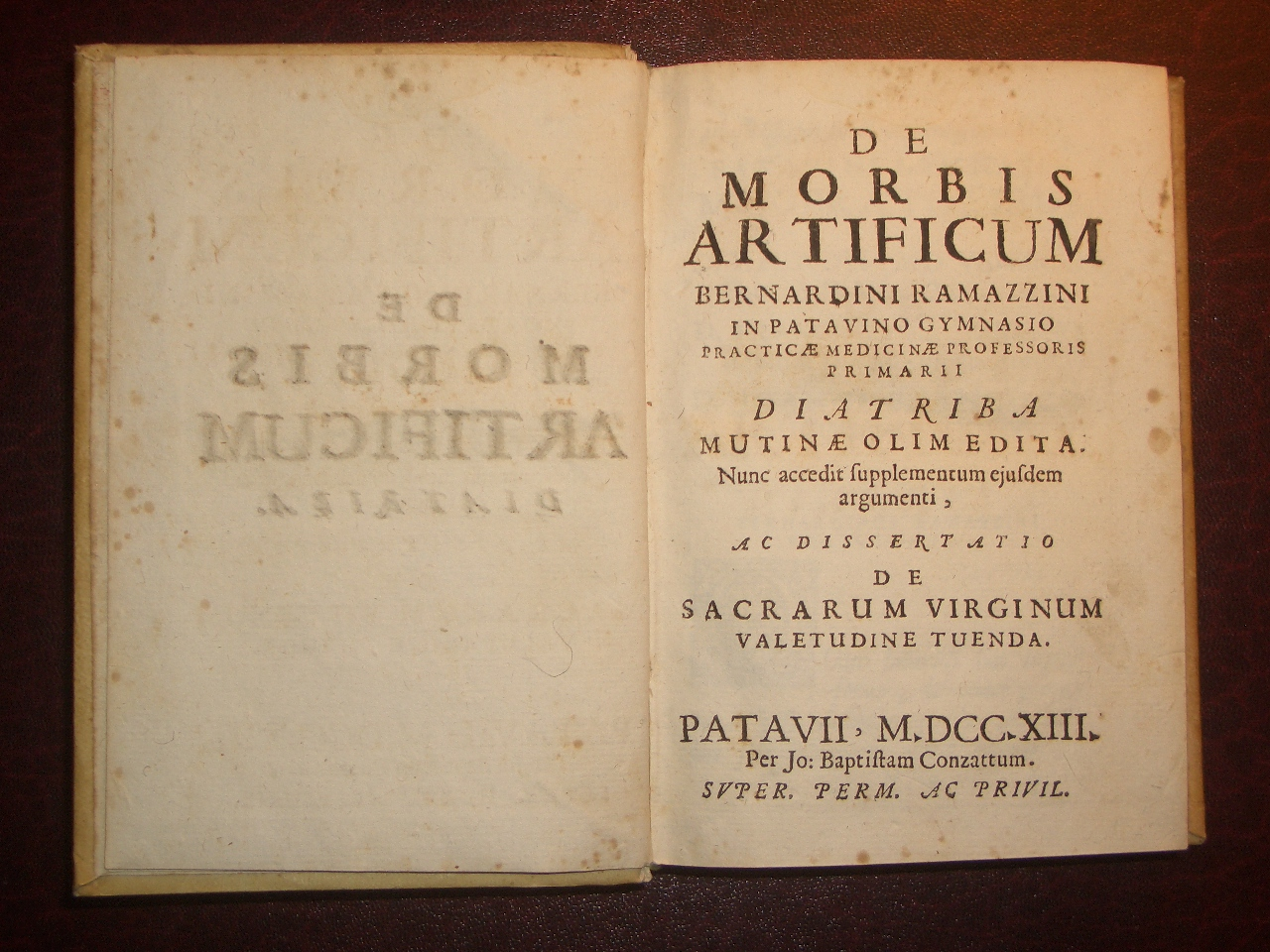
Frontpage of the definitive 1713 edition of the Diatriba

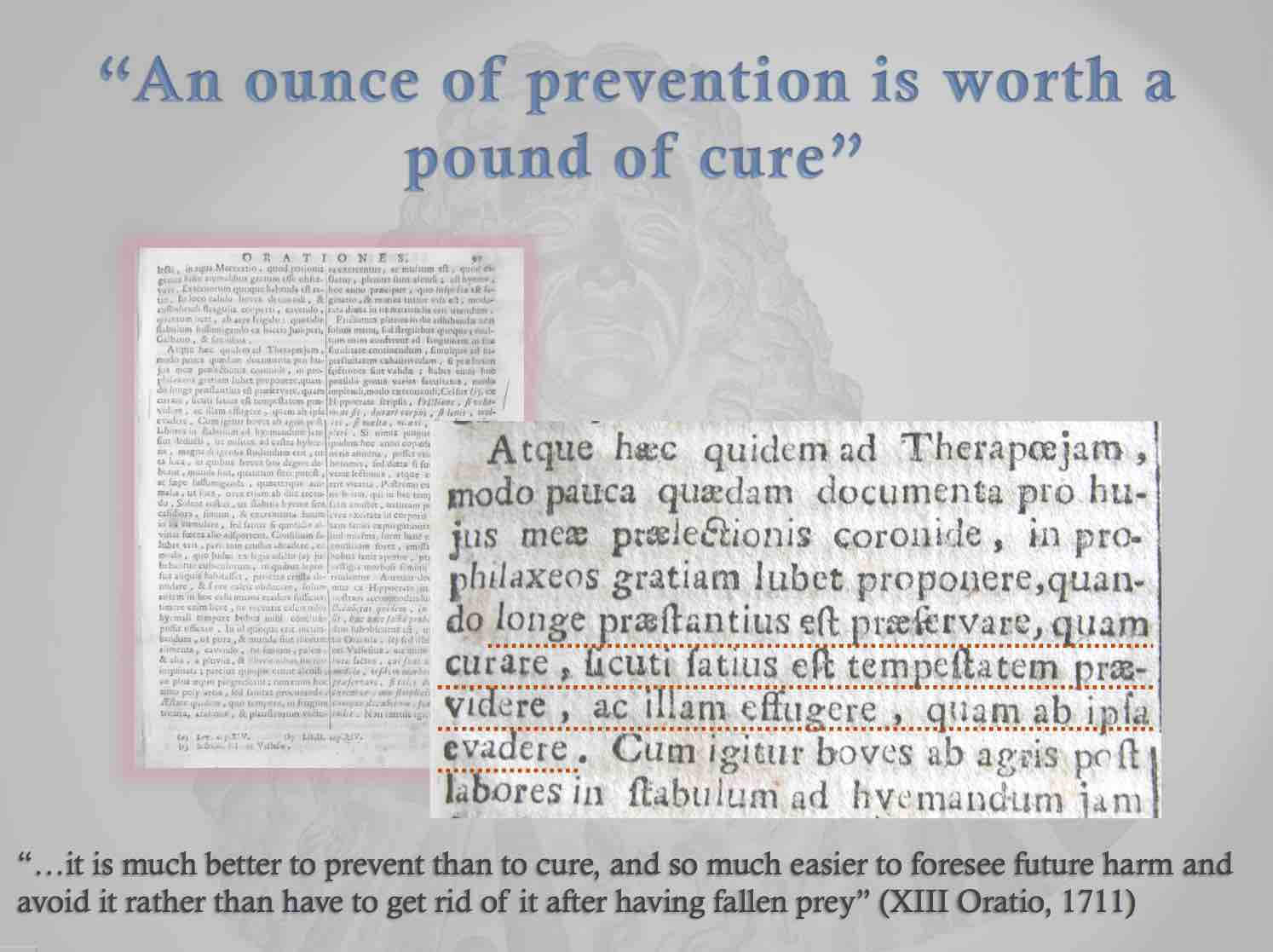
From the presentation given on occasion of the tercentenary of Ramazzini's death – Padua and São Paulo, 2015

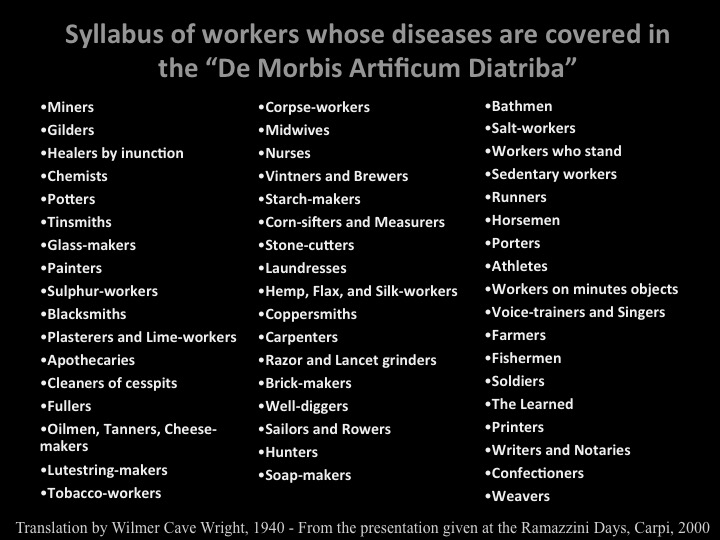
List of occupations - From the presentation given at the Ramazzini Days, Carpi, 2000

His book on occupational diseases, De Morbis Artificum Diatriba (Diseases of Workers) outlined the health hazards of chemicals, dust, metals, repetitive or violent motions, odd postures, and other disease-causative agents encountered by workers in more than fifty occupations. This was one of the founding and seminal works of occupational medicine and played a substantial role in its development.

He proposed that physicians should extend the list of questions that Hippocrates recommended they ask their patients by adding, "What is your occupation?".

Ramazzini saw prevention as being better than cure. In his Oratio given in 1711, he suggested that "it is much better to prevent than to cure, and so much easier to foresee future harm and avoid it rather than have to get rid of it after having fallen prey".

=== Malaria ===
In regards to malaria, Ramazzini was one of the first to support the use of the quinine-rich bark cinchona. Many falsely claimed that quinine was toxic and ineffective, but Ramazzini recognized its importance. He is quoted, "It [quinine] did for medicine what gun powder did for war."

=== Cancer ===
In 1713, Bernardino Ramazzini said that nuns developed breast cancer at a higher rate than married women, because they did not engage in sexual intercourse, and the "unnatural" lack of sexual activity caused instability of the breast tissues that sometimes developed into breast cancer.

== Death ==
Ramazzini died in Padua on 5 November 1714.

== Acknowledgement ==
In a lifestyle article "Sitting can lead to an early death", the writer acknowledged Ramazzini's pioneering study of this field in the 17th century.

The honor society Collegium Ramazzini is named after him.

== Works ==
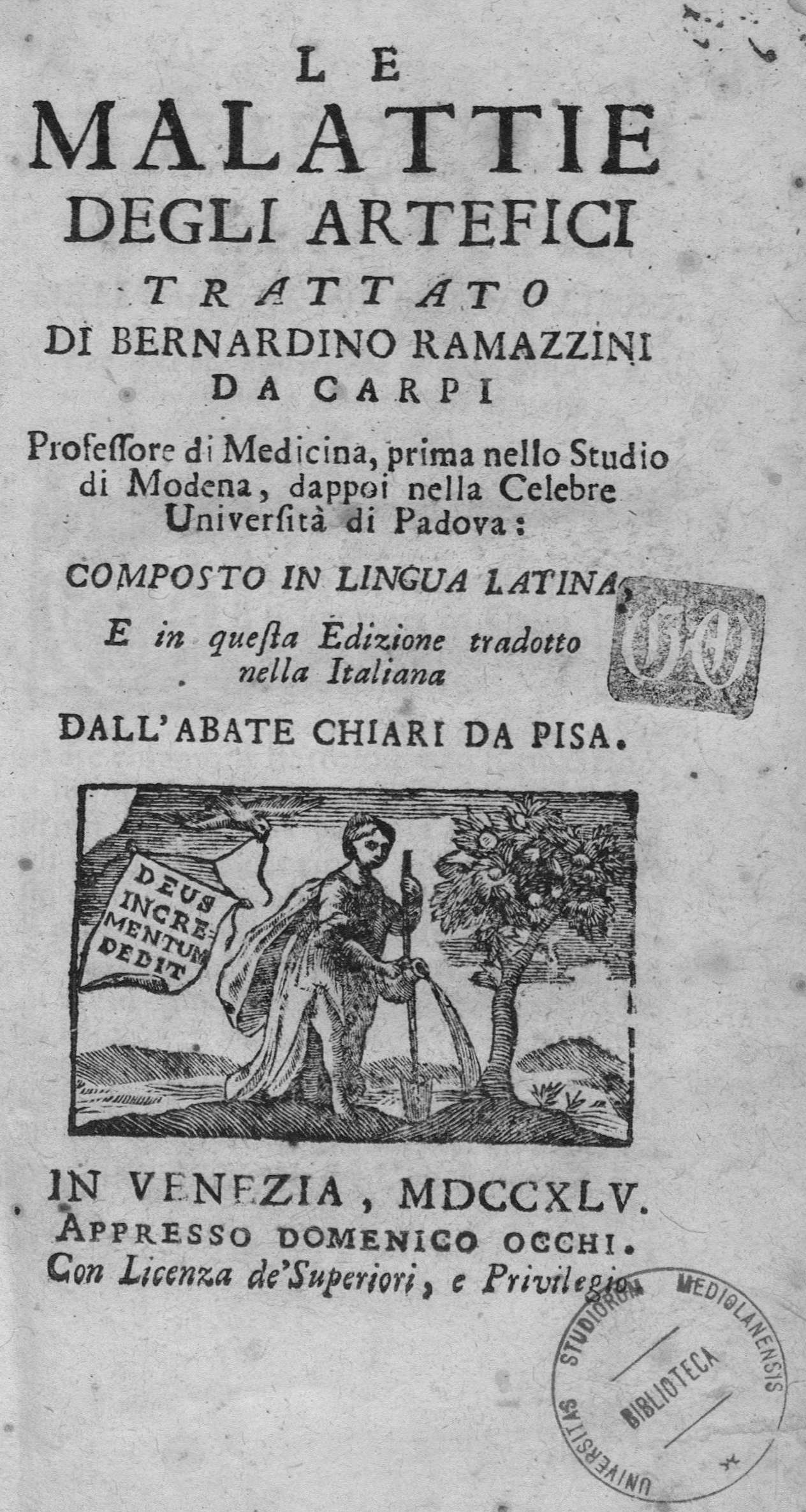
De morbis artificum diatriba, 1745

- Ephemerides barometricae Mutinenses anni 1694 (in Latin). Modena: Antonio Capponi. 1695.
- De principum valetudine tuenda (in Latin). Padova: Giovanni Battista Conzatti. 1710.
- De morbis artificum diatriba (in Italian). Venezia: Domenico Occhi. 1745.

== Bibliography ==
- Essai sur les Maladies de Disseus. Original translation from Latin in "De Mortis Artificum" by M. De Foureau
- Altschuler, Eric Lewin (2005). "Ramazzini and writer's cramp". The Lancet. 365 (9463): 938. doi:10.1016/S0140-6736(05)71080-1. PMID 15766994. S2CID 26226325.
- Marin, V Terribile Wiel; Bellinati C; Panetto M; Zanchin G (November 2003). "Bernardino Ramazzini lies in Padua". The Lancet. 362 (9396): 1680. doi:10.1016/S0140-6736(03)14817-9. PMID 14630462. S2CID 30133828.
- Franco, G (September 1999). "Ramazzini and workers' health". Lancet. 354 (9181): 858–861. doi:10.1016/S0140-6736(99)80042-7. hdl:11380/305091. PMID 10485743. S2CID 33545863.
- "Bernardini Ramazzini (1633–1714) physician of the tradesmen". JAMA. 210 (13): 2391–2392. December 1969. doi:10.1001/jama.210.13.2391. PMID 4902526.
- Bisetti, A A (1988). "Bernardino Ramazzini and occupational lung medicine". Ann. N. Y. Acad. Sci. 534 (1): 1029–1037. Bibcode:1988NYASA.534.1029B. doi:10.1111/j.1749-6632.1988.tb30193.x. PMID 3291704. S2CID 46624370.
- Zanchin, Giorgio; Capitanio Mariatonia; Panetto Monica; Visentin Guido; Marin Vito Terrbile Wiel (June 2005). "Bernardino Ramazzini rests in Padua". Vesalius: Acta Internationales Historiae Medicinae. 11 (1): 15–20. PMID 16208850.
- Hook, G E (November 1995). "Ramazzini: father of environmental health?". Environ. Health Perspect. 103 (11): 982–983. Bibcode:1995EnvHP.103..982H. doi:10.1289/ehp.95103982. JSTOR 3432616. PMC 1519185. PMID 8605856.
- Pope, Malcolm H (October 2004). "Bernardino Ramazzini: the father of occupational medicine". Spine. 29 (20): 2335–2338. doi:10.1097/01.brs.0000142437.70429.a8. PMID 15480150.
- Franco G, Franco F. Bernardino Ramazzini: The Father of Occupational Medicine. Am J Publ Health 2001;91:1380–1382
- Franco G, Fusetti L. A. Bernardino Ramazzini's early observations of the link between musculoskeletal disorders and ergonomic factors. Appl Ergonom 2004;34:67–70.
- Franco G. Ramazzini and workers’ voice disorders. Otolaryngol Head Neck Surg 2008;139:329
- Franco G. Work-related musculoskeletal disorders. A lesson from the past. Epidemiology 2010;21:577–579
- Franco G. Health disorders and ergonomic concerns from the use of microscope: A voice from the past. Am J Clin Pathol 2011; 135:170–171
- Franco, G. (2012). "Bernardino Ramazzini and women workers' health in the second half of the XVIIth century". Journal of Public Health. 34 (2): 305–8. doi:10.1093/pubmed/fds029. hdl:11380/734847. PMID 22467901.
- Franco G. A tribute to Bernardino Ramazzini (1633–1714) on the tercentenary of his death Occ Med 2014;64:2–4
- Carnevale F, Iavicoli S. Bernardino Ramazzini (1633–1714): a visionary physician, scientist and communicator. Occup Environ Med 2015;72:2–3.
- Franco G. La lezione di Bernardino Ramazzini, medico sociale e scienziato visionario. Acc. Naz. Sci Lett. Arti di Modena - Memorie Scientifiche 2015;18:49–62
- Franco G. Prevention is far better than cure - Revisiting the past to strengthen the present: the lesson of Bernardino Ramazzini (1633-1714) in public health. YCP Publisher (2020) (Contents, Preface, Overview)
