= Matthew Boulton (epidemiologist) =

American epidemiologist and physician

Matthew L. Boulton
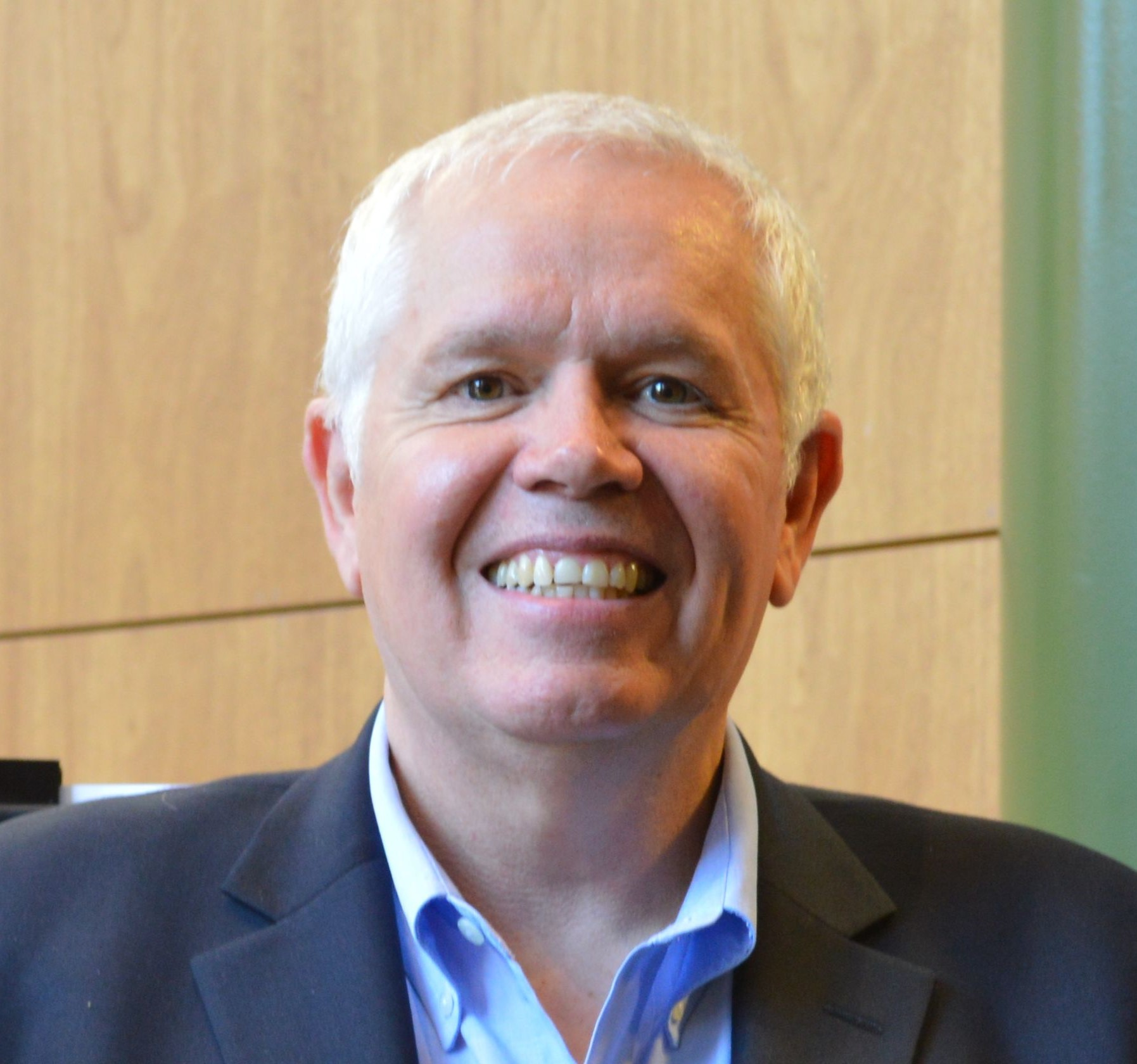
- Education: BS, zoology and BS, plant biology, 1980, University of Nevada; MD University of Nevada, 1987; MPH, Department of International Health and Population Planning, University of Michigan School of Public Health, 1991
- Occupations: Physician and epidemiologist; Editor-in-chief, American Journal of Preventive Medicine

Matthew L. Boulton is an American epidemiologist and physician. He currently serves as the Editor-in-Chief of the American Journal of Preventive Medicine, and is the former Chief Medical Executive, State Epidemiologist, and Director of the Bureau of Epidemiology for the State of Michigan. At the University of Michigan School of Public Health, Boulton is Senior Associate Dean for Global Public Health, the Pearl L. Kendrick Collegiate Professor of Global Health, and a Professor of Epidemiology, Professor of Preventive Medicine, and a Professor of Internal Medicine, Infectious Disease Division, at Michigan Medicine.

== Education ==
In 1980, Boulton received both a B.S. in plant biology with honors and a B.S. in zoology with honors from the University of Nevada. Then in 1987, he received his M.D. from the University of Nevada School of Medicine. Boulton received an M.P.H. in the Department of International Health and Population Planning at the University of Michigan School of Public Health in 1991, and also completed training in the Preventive Medicine Residency Program at the School of Public Health, University of Michigan from 1989 to 1991. Prior to that he held a Medical Internship in the Department of Family Practice, University of Michigan from 1988 to 1989.

== Public service ==
As a public servant, he served as a medical director for several local health departments in Michigan. Boulton was appointed by the Governor as the State Epidemiologist for the Michigan Department of Health, as the Director of its Bureau of Epidemiology, a position he held between 1998 and 2004. That year he was then appointed as the Chief Medical Executive for the Michigan Department of Community Health. His responsibilities included serving as the department's chief physician and as a clinical advisor. In 2004 he also became a commissioned officer in the U.S. Food and Drug Administration, with regional federal investigative authority in foodborne outbreak inquiries.

== Academic career ==
While working for the State of Michigan, Boulton was a clinical associate professor of epidemiology at the University of Michigan. As an academic, Boulton serves as Pearl L. Kendrick Collegiate Professor of Global Public Health, as Professor of Health Management & Policy, Professor of Epidemiology, and Professor of Preventive Medicine at the University of Michigan School of Public Health, as well as Professor of Internal Medicine, Infectious Diseases Division, at the University of Michigan Medical School. He is Director of the Minority Health & Health Disparities International Research Training Program. He previously served as Director of the Center of Excellence in Public Health Workforce Studies, Director of the Preventive Medicine Residency, and served six years as Associate Dean for Public Health Practice. He is now Senior Associate Dean for Global Public Health. Boulton became the Editor-in-Chief of the American Journal of Preventive Medicine in 2014. Boulton served as Senior Editor for the 16th (and 100th anniversary) edition of Maxcy-Rosenau-Last Public Health and Preventive Medicine which was published in November 2021. He revised and expanded the text to 186 chapters and added several new sections. He is also on the editorial boards of the US CDC's Morbidity and Mortality Weekly Report, and has served on the CDC's Board of Scientific Counselors for Infectious Diseases.

== Research ==
Boulton researches public health issues and preventive medicine in several different countries, including childhood vaccines, preventable disease such as measles, immunizations, and the health workforce. His research in 2015 led to a discovery of lack of children receiving timely vaccinations in India, leading to outbreaks of diseases like the measles. He has also studied the outbreaks of infectious diseases like Ebola in Africa. He has also researched the R&D and pharmaceutical development in mainland China. He has authored more than 175 peer-reviewed publications.

== Recognition ==
Boulton is a fellow of the American College of Preventive Medicine. He is a recipient of the 2012 Duncan Clark Award for lifetime achievement in preventive education and public health from the Association for Preventive Teaching and Research, as well as the associations’ F. Marian Bishop Outstanding Educator of the Year Award and Ronald Davis Special Recognition award from the American College of Preventive Medicine.
