= American Journal of Preventive Medicine =

- Discipline: Preventive medicine Public health
- Language: English
- Edited by: Matthew L. Boulton

Publication details
- History: 1985–present
- Publisher: Elsevier on behalf of the American College of Preventive Medicine and the Association for Prevention Teaching and Research (United States)
- Frequency: Monthly
- Impact factor: 6.604 (2021)

Standard abbreviations
- ISO 4: Am. J. Prev. Med.

Indexing
- CODEN: AJPMEA
- ISSN: 0749-3797 (print); 1873-2607 (web)
- LCCN: 86643981
- OCLC no.: 11120856

Links
- Journal homepage; Online access; Online archive

The American Journal of Preventive Medicine is a monthly peer-reviewed medical journal that publishes articles (in-print and online) in the areas of prevention research, teaching, practice and policy. Original research is published on interventions aimed at the prevention of chronic and acute disease and the promotion of individual and community health, as well as health services research pertinent to prevention and public health. Papers also address educational initiatives aimed at improving the ability of health professionals to provide effective clinical prevention and public health services. The journal periodically publishes supplements issues devoted to areas of current interest to the prevention community.

== History ==
The journal was established in 1985 as a bimonthly journal and is the official journal of the American College of Preventive Medicine and the Association for Prevention Teaching and Research. The journal receives oversight from a standing Governing Board composed of members appointed by APTR and ACPM. The current editor-in-chief is Matthew L. Boulton (University of Michigan). Previous editors-in-chief have been:

- Nemat O. Borhani (1985–1986)
- Joseph Stokes (1986–1989)
- Bob Lawrence (1989–1991)
- Charles Hennekens (1991–1994)
- Kevin Patrick (1995–2013)

The journal was originally published by Oxford University Press. The current publisher, Elsevier took over in 1998.

== Abstracting and indexing ==
The journal is abstracted and indexed in:

- BIOSIS
- Chemical Abstracts
- Current Contents
- EMBASE
- International Nursing Index
- MEDLINE/PubMed
- PsycINFO
- Scopus
- Sociological Abstracts
- Tropical Diseases Bulletin

According to the Journal Citation Reports, the journal has a 2021 impact factor of 6.604.
