= American Osteopathic College of Occupational & Preventive Medicine =

- Abbreviation: AOCOPM
- Formation: 1979
- Type: Professional association
- Headquarters: Edmond, Oklahoma
- Location: United States
- Official language: English
- President: Keith Proctor, DO, MSPH, FAOCOPM
- Key people: Jeffrey J. LeBoeuf, EdD, MBA, MHA, CAE, FAOCOPM (honorary) - Executive Director
- Website: www.aocopm.org

The American Osteopathic College of Occupational & Preventive Medicine (AOCOPM) is the national osteopathic medical specialty college for preventive medicine physicians, founded in 1979. AOCOPM consists of three divisions of population-based medicine: Aerospace & Hyperbaric medicine, Occupational & Environmental medicine and Public Health & General Preventive medicine. AOCOPM is an affiliate society of the American Osteopathic Association (AOA), AOCOPM is currently located in Edmond, Oklahoma.

Aerospace Medicine focuses on the clinical care, research, and operational support of the health, safety, and performance of crewmembers and passengers of air and space vehicles, together with the support personnel who assist operation of such vehicles. This population often works and lives in remote, isolated, extreme, or enclosed environments under conditions of physical and psychological stress. Practitioners strive for an optimal human-machine match in occupational settings rich with environmental hazards and engineering countermeasures.

Occupational & Environmental Medicine focuses on the health of workers, including the ability to perform work; the physical, chemical, biological, and social environments of the workplace; and the health outcomes of environmental exposures. Practitioners in this field address the promotion of health in the workplace, and the prevention and management of occupational and environmental injury, illness, and disability.

Public Health & General Preventive Medicine focuses on promoting health, preventing disease, and managing the health of communities and defined populations. These practitioners combine population-based public health skills with knowledge of primary, secondary, and tertiary prevention-oriented clinical practice in a wide variety of settings.

== History ==
AOCOPM was chartered in 1979 as the American Osteopathic Academy of Public Health & Preventive Medicine. The organization merged in 1984 with the American Osteopathic Occupational Medicine Association to form the American Osteopathic College of Preventive Medicine. In February, 1995, the current name was adopted to better reflect the membership.

== Continuing medical education ==
The College provides two major conferences each year: one in the spring and one in the fall. The fall conference is part of the AOA Annual Osteopathic Medical Conference and Exposition.

AOCOPM also provides a three-part Basic Course in Occupational & Environmental Medicine, designed to provide a basic understanding and expertise in the field, while preparing qualified participants to take the written examination for the AOA-approved Certificate of Added Qualifications (CAQ) offered by the American Osteopathic Board of Preventive Medicine (AOBPM) via the practice pathway. The purpose of a CAQ is to provide credentialing in the field of occupational/environmental medicine for those who already practice in this field and are certified by the AOA in another primary specialty.

== Publications ==
The College publishes a monthly newsletter.

== See also ==
- American Osteopathic Board of Preventive Medicine
