= Suva (insurer) =

Swiss insurance company

Swiss National Accident Insurance Fund (Suva)

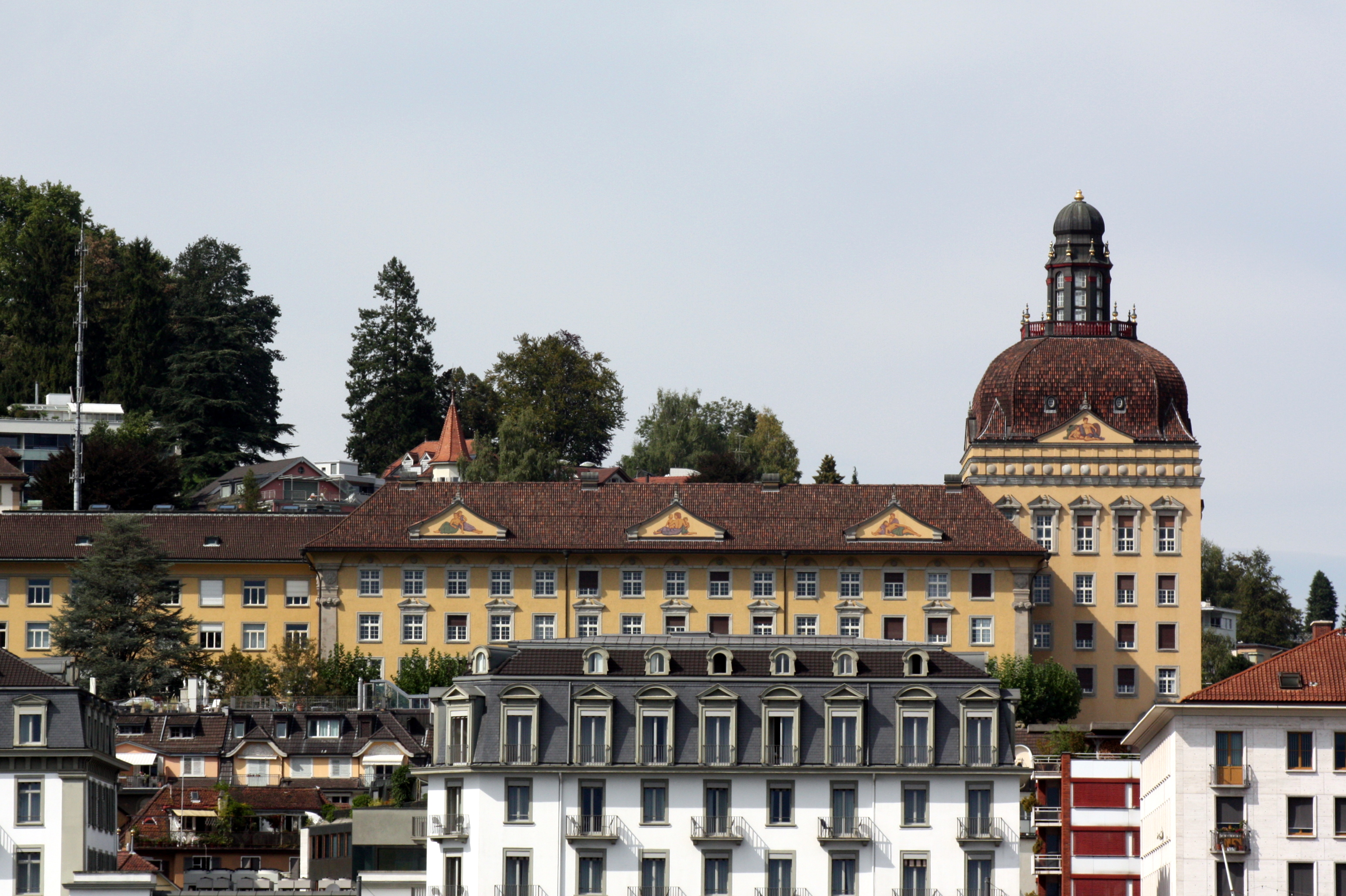
- Headquarters in Lucerne.
- Company type: State-owned enterprise
- Industry: Accident insurance
- Founded: 1918; 108 years ago
- Founder: Hermann Häberlin
- Headquarters: Lucerne, Switzerland
- Area served: Switzerland
- Number of employees: 4200 (2018)
- Divisions: Rehabilitation clinics of Bellikon and Sion
- Website: www.suva.ch

The Suva, headquartered in Lucerne, is the Swiss National Accident Insurance Fund. It is a public-sector insurer and leading provider of health care coverage for employees in case of accidents in Switzerland.

== Name ==
The name is the abbreviation of Schweizerische Unfallversicherungsanstalt (German for Swiss National Accident Insurance Fund, in French Caisse nationale suisse d'assurance en cas d'accidents or CNA; in Italian Istituto nazionale svizzero di assicurazione contro gli infortuni).

== History ==
It was founded 1912 and it's active since 1918. For a long time, it held a monopoly for compulsory coverage for employees in high-risk professions. Its surplus income is distributed to insureds in the form of premium reductions.

Its three missions are prevention, insurance and rehabilitation. About half of the people working in Switzerland are insured by the Suva in case of accidents (128,000 companies and 2,000,000 people insured).

Unemployed people are insured against accidents by the Suva. Since 2005, the Swiss Armed Forces are also insured against accidents by the Suva.

== See also ==
- Trauma und Berufskrankheit (journal)
