= Quaternary prevention =

- Purpose: identify patients at risk of overmedication

Quaternary prevention means avoiding unnecessary medical interventions. They are the actions taken to identify an individual at risk of overmedicalisation, to protect them from new medical invasion, and to suggest interventions which are ethically acceptable. The term was coined by the Belgian general practitioner Marc Jamoulle,

Quaternary prevention is the set of activities to mitigate or avoid the consequences of unnecessary or excessive intervention of the health system, i.e. iatrogenic damage.

== Definition ==
The Wonca International Dictionary for General/Family Practice defines it as "action taken to identify patient at risk of overmedicalisation, to protect him from new medical invasion, and to suggest to him interventions, which are ethically acceptable".

Alternatively, quaternary prevention has been defined as an "action taken to protect individuals from medical interventions that are likely to cause more harm than good."

== Per Jamoulle ==
Jamoulle divided medical situations into four quadrants based on if the patient was experiencing illness (i.e. if the patient experienced subjective poor health) and if a health care provider had identified disease (constructed based on diagnostic criteria), with a different type of prevention happening in each:

1. Primary prevention when both illness and disease are absent
2. Secondary prevention when illness is absent but disease is present
3. Tertiary prevention when both illness and disease are present
4. Quaternary prevention when the patient is experiencing illness but there is no identified disease

Jamoulle noted that when the patient was experiencing illness but no specific disease had been identified that patient was particularly vulnerable to their condition being made worse by invasive or harmful diagnostic medical intervention.

== See also ==
- Bioethics
- Cascade effect
- Defensive medicine
- Iatrogenesis
- Medical ethics
- Medicalization
- Medicine
- Patient safety
- Preventive medicine
