= University of Occupational and Environmental Health Japan =

Japanese private university

Coordinates: 33.878749°N 130.712345°E

University of Occupational and Environmental Health Japan (産業医科大学, Sangyō ika daigaku) is a private university in Kitakyushu City, Fukuoka Prefecture, Japan, established in 1978.
