= American Board of Preventive Medicine =

The American Board of Preventive Medicine (ABPM) is a member of the American Board of Medical Specialties that issues "certificates of special knowledge" in the specialty of preventive medicine. These certificates are known as "Board Certification" in the United States and is generally recognized as verification of a physician's professional capabilities in that area. The ABPM provides board certification services for physicians trained in addiction medicine, aerospace medicine, clinical informatics, occupational medicine, and public health and general preventive medicine and is one of two organizations to provide board certifications in these specialties with the American Osteopathic Board of Preventive Medicine serving as the other.

== See also ==
- American Osteopathic Board of Preventive Medicine
