= Trauma und Berufskrankheit =

- Discipline: Traumatology, occupational health
- Language: German
- Edited by: Christian Jürgens

Publication details
- History: 1999–2021
- Publisher: Springer Science+Business Media (Germany, Austria, Switzerland)
- Frequency: Quarterly
- Open access: Hybrid

Standard abbreviations
- ISO 4: Trauma Berufskrankh.

Indexing
- ISSN: 1436-6274 (print); 1436-6282 (web)
- OCLC no.: 472980524

Links
- Journal homepage

Trauma und Berufskrankheit was a peer-reviewed medical journal covering different aspects of traumatology and occupational health. It was published by Springer Science+Business Media and is edited by Christian Jürgens.

The journal published original research papers and systematic reviews, partly organised as research topics, from the areas trauma surgery, occupational medicine and sociomedical assessment.

== Abstracting and indexing ==
The journal was indexed in: Scopus, Google Scholar, EBSCO Academic Search, EBSCO Discovery Service, EBSCO STM Source, EBSCO TOC Premier, EMCare, Emerging Sources Citation Index, Gale, Gale Academic OneFile, Institute of Scientific and Technical Information of China (ISTIC), Naver, OCLC WorldCat Discovery Service, ProQuest-ExLibris Primo, ProQuest-ExLibris Summon, SCImago, Semantic Scholar and WTI Frankfurt eG.
