= American Osteopathic Board of Preventive Medicine =

- Abbreviation: AOBPM
- Formation: 1982
- Type: Professional association
- Headquarters: Chicago, IL
- Location: United States
- Coordinates: 41.8942°N 87.6190°W
- Members: 400
- Official language: English
- Chairman: Stanley H. Miller, DO, MPH
- Vice-Chair: Howard Teitelbaum, DO, PhD, MPH
- Executive Director: Ellen Woods, MSC
- Website: www.aobpm.org

The American Osteopathic Board of Preventive Medicine (AOBPM) is an organization that provides board certification to qualified Doctors of Osteopathic Medicine (D.O.) who specialize in aiding patients in the prevention of injury or disease (preventive medicine physicians). The board is one of 18 physician medical specialty boards of the American Osteopathic Association Bureau of Osteopathic Specialists of the American Osteopathic Association (AOA). The AOBPM was established in 1982 by approval of the Board of Trustees of the American Osteopathic Association. The AOBPM provides board certification for eligible physicians. Additionally, along with fellows of the American Board of Preventive Medicine, fellows of the American Osteopathic Board of Preventive Medicine are eligible to become fellows of the Undersea and Hyperbaric Medical Society. As of December 2011, 176 osteopathic physicians held active membership with the AOBPM.

== Board certification ==
The AOBPM is responsible for evaluation and recommendation for osteopathic medical board certification in the specialty areas of Aerospace Medicine/Undersea & Hyperbaric Medicine, Occupational & Environmental Medicine, and Public Health & General Preventive Medicine. Additionally, the AOBPM is responsible for the certificate of added qualifications (CAQ) in Occupational Medicine, and Undersea & Hyperbaric Medicine.

Osteopathic physicians may enter an AOA-accredited or ACGME-accredited Preventive Medicine residency program. Osteopathic physicians from both pathways are eligible for board certification through the AOBPM.

AOBPM General Certification, Recertification, and Certificate of Added Qualifications examinations are offered annually, every spring, in conjunction with the American Osteopathic College of Occupational & Preventive Medicine Mid-Year Educational Conference.

== See also ==
- American Board of Preventive Medicine
- American Osteopathic College of Occupational & Preventive Medicine
- American Osteopathic Association Bureau of Osteopathic Specialists
