= Occupational Medicine (Oxford University Press journal) =

- Discipline: Occupational medicine, industrial hygiene
- Language: English
- Edited by: Steven Nimmo

Publication details
- Former names: Journal of the Society of Occupational Medicine; Transactions of the Society of Occupational Medicine; Transactions of the Association of Industrial Medical Officers; Transactions of the Association of Industrial Medical Officers; Quarterly Bulletin of the Association of Industrial Medical Officers
- History: 1948–present
- Publisher: Oxford University Press (United Kingdom)
- Frequency: 8/year
- Open access: Hybrid
- Impact factor: 1.472 (2013)

Standard abbreviations
- ISO 4: Occup. Med. (Lond.)

Indexing
- ISSN: 0962-7480

Links
- Journal homepage; Online access; Online archive

Occupational Medicine is a peer-reviewed medical journal covering occupational medicine. It is published eight times per year by Oxford University Press. The journal covers "work-related injury and illness, accident and illness prevention, health promotion, occupational disease, health education, the establishment and implementation of health and safety standards, monitoring of the work environment, and the management of recognized hazards". It was established in 1948.

== History ==
The journal was initially established as The Quarterly Bulletin of the Association of Industrial Medical Officers in 1948, and became the Transactions of the Association of Industrial Medical Officers from 1951 to 1965. From 1966 to 1972, it was known as the Transactions of the Society of Occupational Medicine, and from 1973 to 1991 it was known as the Journal of the Society of Occupational Medicine. It took the current name of Occupational Medicine in 1992.

== Abstracting and indexing ==
The journal is covered by several major indexing services including:

- CAB Abstracts
- Current Contents/Clinical Medicine
- EMBASE
- Environmental Science and Pollution Management
- Ergonomics Abstracts
- Excerpta Medica
- PubMed
- Science Citation Index
