= The Journal of Headache and Pain =

Medical journal

- Subject: Headache
- Language: English
- Edited by: Paolo Martelletti

Publication details
- History: 2000–present
- Publisher: BioMed Central
- Frequency: Continuous
- Open access: Yes
- License: Creative Commons Attribution 4.0 International
- Impact factor: 7.4 (2022)

Standard abbreviations
- ISO 4: J. Headache Pain

Indexing
- CODEN: JHPOAT
- ISSN: 1129-2369 (print); 1129-2377 (web)
- LCCN: 2003255145
- OCLC no.: 639068356

Links
- Journal homepage; Online archive2

The Journal of Headache and Pain is a peer-reviewed open access medical journal covering research on headache and related types of pain. It was established in 2000 and is published by BioMed Central. It is the official journal of the European Headache Federation and Lifting The Burden and Asian Regional Consortium for Headache. The founding editor-in-chief is Paolo Martelletti (Sapienza University of Rome). According to the Journal Citation Reports, the journal has a 2023 impact factor of 7.3.
