= Spine (journal) =

- Discipline: Orthopaedics
- Language: English
- Edited by: Andrew J. Schoenfeld, M.D.

Publication details
- History: 1976-present
- Publisher: Lippincott Williams & Wilkins
- Frequency: Biweekly
- Impact factor: 3.0 (2022)

Standard abbreviations
- ISO 4: Spine
- NLM: Spine (Phila Pa 1976)

Indexing
- CODEN: SPINDD
- ISSN: 0362-2436 (print); 1528-1159 (web)
- LCCN: 76646361
- OCLC no.: 476172259

Links
- Journal homepage; Online access; Online archive

Spine is a biweekly peer-reviewed medical journal covering research in the field of orthopaedics, especially concerning the spine. It was established in 1976 and is published by Lippincott Williams & Wilkins. The current editor-in-chief is Andrew J. Schoenfeld, M.D.. Spine is considered the leading orthopaedic journal covering cutting-edge spine research. Spine is available in print and online. Spine is considered the most cited journal in orthopaedics.

== Affiliated societies ==
The following societies are affiliated with Spine:

- Argentine Society for the Study of Spine Pathology
- Asia Pacific Orthopaedic Association - Spinal Section
- Chinese Orthopaedic Association
- Finnish Spine Research Society
- International Society for the Study of the Lumbar Spine
- Japan Spine Research Society
- Korean Society of Spine Surgery
- Scoliosis Research Society
- Spine Section of the Hellenic Orthopaedic Association
- Spine Society of Australia
- Spine Society of Europe
