= Hinkley groundwater contamination =

Human-caused environmental event in the US

Coordinates: 34.903°N 117.160°W

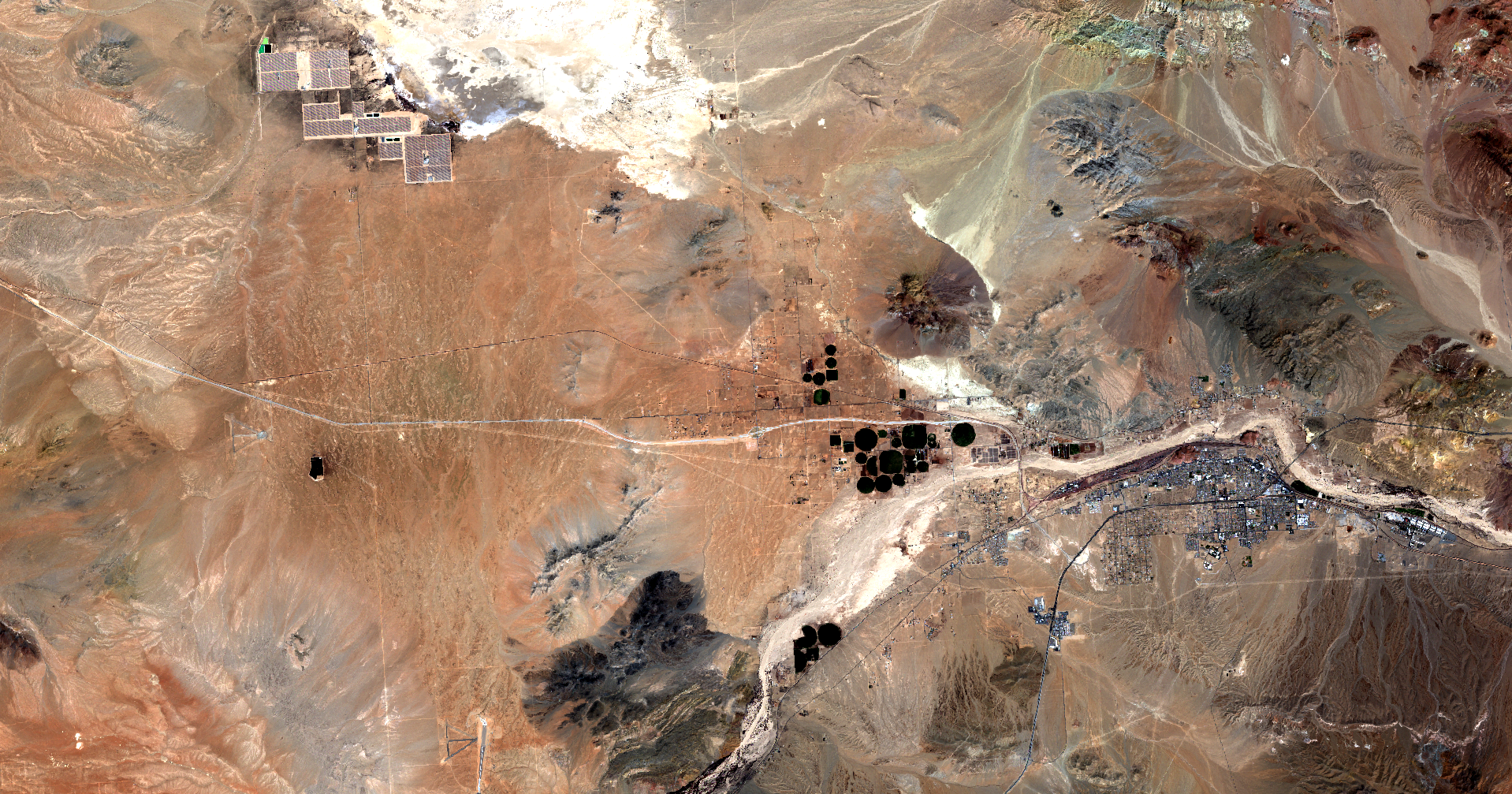
Satellite image of Hinkley, Barstow and Harper Lake, California

From 1952 to 1966, Pacific Gas and Electric Company (PG&E) dumped about 370 million U.S. gallons (1.4×10^{9} liters) of chromium-tainted wastewater into unlined wastewater spreading ponds around the town of Hinkley, California, located in the Mojave Desert about 120 miles (190 kilometers) north-northeast of Los Angeles.

PG&E used chromium 6, or hexavalent chromium (a cheap and efficient rust suppressor), in its compressor station for natural-gas transmission pipelines. Hexavalent-chromium compounds are genotoxic carcinogens.

In 1993, legal clerk Erin Brockovich began an investigation into the health impacts of the contamination. A class-action lawsuit about the contamination was settled on July 2, 1996 for $333 million (around $651 million in 2024). In 2008, PG&E settled the last of the cases involved with the Hinkley claims. Since then, the town's population has dwindled to the point that in 2016 The New York Times described Hinkley as having slowly become a ghost town.

== History ==
During the early 1950s, Pacific Gas & Electric built its first two compressor stations in Topock, Arizona, and Hinkley at the southern end of what became its trans-California natural-gas transmission system: a network of eight compressor stations linked with 40,000 miles (64,000 km) of distribution pipeline and 6,000 miles (9,700 km) of transport pipeline. From Bakersfield to the Oregon border, the network served 4.2 million customers. At the Topock and Hinkley compressor stations, a hexavalent chromium additive was used as a rust inhibitor in cooling towers. The water was then disposed adjacent to the compressor stations. Although the dumping took place from 1952 to 1966 (when Hinkley was a remote desert community with one school and a general store), PG&E did not inform the local water board about the contamination until December 7, 1987.

Residents of Hinkley filed a class action against PG&E, Anderson, et al. v. Pacific Gas and Electric (Superior Ct. for County of San Bernardino, Barstow Division, file BCV 00300). LeRoy A. Simmons was the judge. In 1993, Erin Brockovich (a legal clerk for lawyer Edward L. Masry) investigated an apparent cluster of illnesses in the community which were linked to hexavalent chromium. The case was referred to arbitration, with maximum damages of $400 million for more than 600 people. After arbitration for the first 40 people resulted in about $120 million, PG&E reassessed its position and decided to end arbitration and settle the case. It was settled in 1996 for $333 million, the largest settlement of a class action lawsuit in U.S. history at the time.

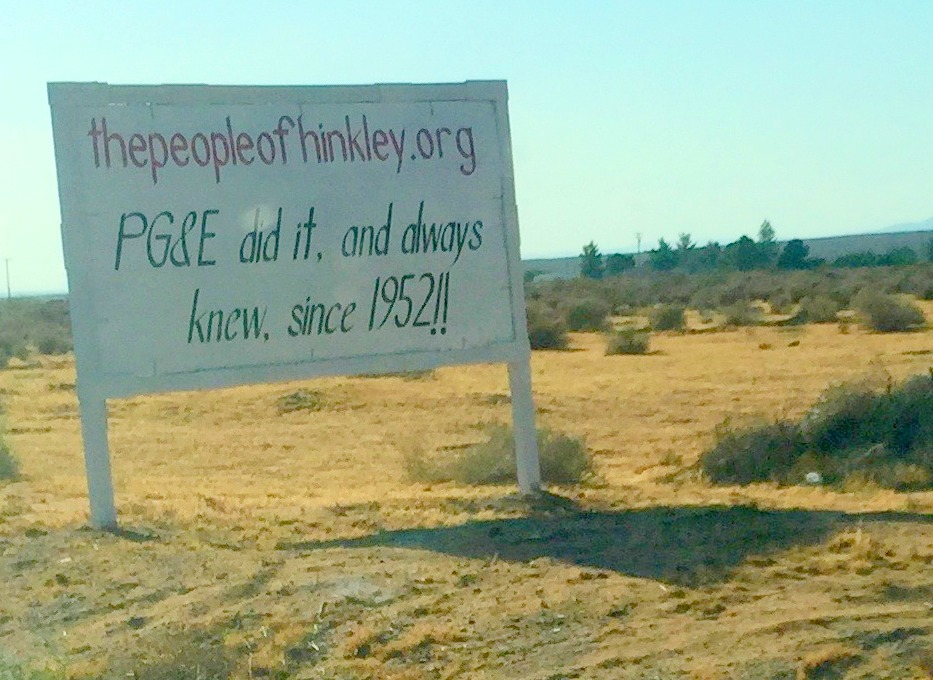
Protest sign outside Hinkley

During negotiations, the presiding judges told PG&E's lawyers that a 1987 study by Chinese scientist Jian Dong Zhang reporting a strong link between chromium 6 pollution and cancer in humans would be "influential" in their decision. In 1997, an article was published in which Zhang retracted his 1987 research. ChemRisk, a firm known to be working with PG&E since 1995, updated his analysis and published it in the April 1997 Journal of Occupational and Environmental Medicine (JOEM, the official publication of the American College of Occupational and Environmental Medicine) as a retraction of Zhang's 1987 paper. It was published under Zhang's name (then a retired Chinese government health officer, and despite his written objection) and that of a second Chinese scientist, Shu Kun Li. Peter Waldman, reporter for The Wall Street Journal, wrote that Zhang's son was "outraged" at "the idea that his father would willingly have invalidated his earlier award-winning work." According to the Center for Public Integrity, "In contrast to the earlier article, the new one concluded that chromium wasn't the likely culprit. The revised study—which did not reveal the involvement of PG&E or its scientists—helped persuade California health officials to delay new drinking water standards for chromium."

In March 2001, the California Environmental Protection Agency (CalEPA) asked the University of California, Berkeley to name a panel of experts to form the Chromate Toxicity Review Committee. The California Office of Environmental Health Hazard Assessment (OEHHA), established in 1991 with the creation of CalEPA, had been located across from UC Berkeley and had maintained academic ties with the school. A meeting was held on July 25, 2001, to obtain "public input on the review of scientific questions regarding the potential of chromium 6+ to cause cancer when ingested." The panel was selected by Jerold A. Last, with Dennis Paustenbach as vice-president, and included Mark Schrenker, Silvio De Flora and John Froines. Paustenbach, De Flora and Froines resigned from the committee and were replaced.

On August 31, 2001, the Chromate Toxicity Review Committee (which then included Russell Flegal, Jerold Last, Ernest E. McConnell of ToxPath, Marc Schenker and Hanspeter Witschi) submitted its report, entitled "Scientific Review of Toxicological and Human Health Issues Related to the Development of a Public Health Goal for Chromium(VI)". The committee recommended that reports of chromium concentrations (particularly in southern California) were alarmist and "spuriously high", and further evaluation should be handled by academics in laboratory settings—not by regulators. The report cited the 1987 Zhang article and its retracted 1997 version. Citing the 2001 Chromate Toxicity Review Committee review in November of that year, the Office of Environmental Health Hazard Assessment withdrew its 1999 public-health goal for total chromium in drinking water of 2.5 parts per billion.

In 2001, the law firm of Engstron, Lipscomb and Lack filed a follow-up lawsuit on behalf of 900 people alleging chromium contamination in Hinkley and Kettleman, California. Two years later, Senator Deborah Ortiz (who represented the Sacramento area and chaired the Senate Health and Human Services Committee) called a Senate hearing about "Possible Interference in the Scientific Review of Chromium VI Toxicity". At the hearing, Gary Praglin, a lawyer with Engstron, Lipscomb and Lack in Los Angeles, testified about how the flawed 2001 report by the Chromate Toxicity Review Committee adversely affected the firm's court case against PG&E:

After the blue-ribbon panel report came out, PG&E came into court, and they told the judge that everything had changed. They were waving the blue-ribbon report—the blue-ribbon panel report—like a flag. They said to the judge, the State of California has spoken. It has said that chromium VI does not cause cancer by ingestion, and they wanted to amend their paperwork, their motions, their declarations, and move to dismiss our case. And they got that permission to do that. They amended all their paperwork, and we were given permission to take discovery—to take depositions, issue subpoenas—and we have obtained thousands of pages of documents in connection with the blue-ribbon panel process.

Since the Hinkley groundwater contamination lawsuit, a group of California-based scientists with organizations such as the Desert Sierra Cancer Surveillance Program (DSCSP) and ChemRisk have argued against the claim that chromium 6 is genotoxic, downplaying the number of cancer cases and challenging a "cancer cluster in the Hinkley area".

According to the lawsuit, PG&E was also required to discontinue its use of chromium 6 and clean up the contaminated groundwater. By 2008 the chromium plume was spreading, however, and it attracted media attention by 2011. In November 2010, PG&E began offering to purchase threatened houses and property in Hinkley and to provide bottled water. By 2013, the plume was over six miles long, two miles wide, and slowly growing.

In 2006, PG&E agreed to pay $295 million to settle cases involving another 1,100 people statewide for hexavalent chromium-related claims. Two years later, it settled the last of the Hinkley claims for $20 million. That year, the United States Environmental Protection Agency (EPA) responded to research by the National Toxicology Program on the development of cancerous tumors in mice and rats who had consumed heavy doses of chromium 6.

California became the first state to acknowledge a link between ingested hexavalent chromium and cancer in July 2014, establishing a maximum contaminant level (MCL) for hexavalent chromium of 10 parts per billion (ppb). Hexavalent chromium is measured in μg/L (micrograms per liter). The EPA does not have an MCL for hexavalent chromium in drinking water, but the agency has an MCL of 100 parts per billion for all forms of chromium.

== Groundwater pollution ==
PG&E operates a compressor station in Hinkley for its natural-gas transmission pipelines. The gas must be re-compressed about every 350 miles (560 km), and the station uses cooling towers to cool the gas after compression.

Between 1952 and 1966, the water in the cooling towers contained hexavalent chromium—now recognized as a carcinogen—to prevent rust in the machinery. The water was stored between uses in unlined ponds, which allowed it to percolate into the groundwater. This led to groundwater pollution, affecting soil and contaminating water wells near the compressor station with a plume originally about two miles (three kilometers) long and nearly one mile (1.6 kilometers) wide. By 2013, the plume was six miles (ten kilometers) long and nearly two miles (three kilometers) wide.

Average hexavalent chromium levels in Hinkley were recorded as 1.19 parts-per-billion (ppb), with an estimated peak of 20 ppb. Based on the PG&E Background Study, the PG&E Topock Compressor Station averaged 7.8 ppb and peaked at 31.8 ppb. The proposed California health goal for hexavalent chromium was 0.02 ppb in 2011. In 1991, when the EPA raised the federal MCL for total chromium to 100 ppb, California remained at 50 ppb. According to CalEPA in 2015, "At the time Total Chromium MCLs were established, ingested Hexavalent Chromium associated with consumption of drinking water was not considered to pose a cancer risk, as is now the case."

== Plume ==
Samples taken in August 2010 showed that the plume of contaminated water had begun to migrate to the lower aquifer. In September 2013, CalEPA reported that the plume had expanded to 6 miles (9.7 km) long and 4 miles (6.4 km) wide. In 2015, the California Regional Water Quality Control Board, Lahontan Region served PG&E with an order to clean up the effects of the chromium discharge. At the time of the report, the plume was "8 miles (13 km) in length and approximately 2 miles (3.2 km) in width, throughout the Hinkley Valley and into Harper Dry Lake Valley."

== Cleanup ==
By 2013, PG&E had spent over $750 million on remediation. Sheryl Bilbrey, in charge of PG&E remediation efforts, explained why remediation was taking a long time. "It's a very complex project. We are highly regulated. There are a lot of interested parties. The other thing is it is very important that we get it right."

For their 2013 series Science for Sale, PBS NewsHour journalist Miles O'Brien interviewed PG&E director of chromium remediation Kevin Sullivan. According to Sullivan, PG&E cleaned up 54 acres (22 ha); however, it would take another 40 years before they were done. PG&E built a concrete barrier about a half-mile long to contain the plume, pumped ethanol into the ground to convert chromium 6 to chromium 3, and planted acres of alfalfa. O'Brien interviewed Erin Brockovich, who was surprised that PG&E had not completed the cleanup it promised over a decade earlier. In correspondence with Sullivan, the Water Board noted that by 2014 "chromium from PG&E's historical releases at the Hinkley Compressor Station has migrated from the upper aquifer to the lower aquifer causing hexavalent chromium concentrations in the lower aquifer to exceed drinking water standards." Cleanup documentation about Hinkley is maintained on the CalEPA webpage.

== Debates ==
A 2007 toxicity report for the National Toxicology Program provided evidence that high doses of chromium 6 caused cancers of the gastrointestinal tract in rats and mice at levels higher than 5 mg/L of water, (5 ppm, or 5,000 ppb).

Average hexavalent chromium levels in Hinkley were recorded at 1.19 ppb, with an estimated peak of 20 ppb. The PG&E Topock Compressor Station averaged 7.8 ppb, peaking at 31.8 ppb (based on the PG&E Background Study). In 2013, PG&E's Sheryl Bilbery told a PBS journalist: "There's a lot of scientists that are still debating that question [hexavalent chromium toxicity]. I think that's why the process has taken so long, from what I have read, both at EPA and at the state level. So, I think they're still trying to figure out exactly what is the right answer there." In July 2014, CalEPA established a maximum chromium-6 MCL of 10 ppb as a result of new research which linked ingestion of hexavalent chromium with cancer.

=== CalEPA ===
California was the first state to put into effect an MCL for hexavalent chromium (chromium 6) in drinking water in July 2014, setting a limit of 10 ppb. A 2015 United States Geological Survey (USGS) report, based on the EPA's 2010 review of the health effects of chromium 6 in drinking water, re-examined related federal regulations. Following California's 2014 limit, Illinois began research in collaboration with the USGS which was published in 2015. According to the USGS report, the EPA proposed in 2010 to "classify Cr(VI) as likely to cause cancer in humans when ingested over a lifetime." Concentrations of chromium 6 in water are given in micrograms and milligrams per liter (μg/L and mg/L), with 50 μg/L equal to 50 ppb and 50 mg/L equal to 50 ppm.

=== John Morgan ===
Since January 1, 1988, all cancers in California have been reported to California Cancer Registry (CCR) regional registries. Hinkley, in San Bernardino County, is covered by the Desert Sierra Cancer Surveillance Program (DSCSP) with the California Department of Public Health. Epidemiologist John Morgan began working with the DSCSP in 1995.

Morgan has published over 100 abstracts, presentations and reports, some of which have been peer-reviewed. Many of his PowerPoint presentations and online posts attempt to debunk allegations that chromium pollution caused the cancer cluster in the Hinkley area and downplay the number of cancer cases there. In his often-cited 2010 California Cancer Registry study, Morgan wrote that cancer rates in Hinkley "remained unremarkable from 1988 to 2008". In a study co-authored with M. E. Reeves, he wrote that "the 196 cases of cancer reported during the most recent survey of 1996 through 2008 were less than what he would expect based on demographics and the regional rate of cancer."

Morgan used cartoon characters in his 2012 PowerPoint presentation at the Proceedings of the North American Association of Central Cancer Registries (NAACCR) Conference, saying: "Inhaled Cr[VI] powder is accepted as a carcinogen, while the role of aqueous Cr[VI] as a human carcinogen has been challenged." He wrote a letter to The Connection to publicize a poster of his. In 2013, the Center for Public Integrity found weaknesses in Morgan's 2010 analysis which challenge the validity of his findings: "In his first study, he dismisses what others see as a genuine cancer cluster in Hinkley. In his latest analysis, he excludes people who were exposed to the worst contamination."

=== Dennis Paustenbach ===
Dennis Paustenbach has been an expert witness and consultant for a number of companies facing lawsuits over products, environmental practices or product safety. Paustenbach was the founder and director of ChemRisk, and Brent Kerger was one of his senior scientists. Their clients included PG&E and BP.

Paustenbach was at the center of a publishing scandal involving the research of Chinese scientist Jian Dong Zhang, who published a paper in 1987 reporting an association between chromium pollution of drinking water and higher rates of stomach cancer in residents of three villages in Liaoning Province (in rural northeastern China) who lived near a chromium-ore smelter and drank tainted water for years.

According to Allan Hirsch, CalEPA's 2008 review of Zhang's 1987 paper agreed with his findings that the rates of stomach cancer in the three villages were significantly higher than those in the province. PG&E hired ChemRisk, a for-profit scientific consulting firm.

According to the Center for Public Integrity, "[Zhang's] revised [1997] study—which did not reveal the involvement of PG&E or its scientists—helped persuade California health officials to delay new drinking water standards for chromium." The EPA cited the article when it allowed the continued use of chromium in a wood preservative, and the Agency for Toxic Substances and Disease Registry discounted chromium 6 as an oral carcinogen because of the revised study.

In 2006, the Journal of Occupational and Environmental Medicine conducted a six-month internal review of the 1997 retraction. Although Zhang had died by the time the JOEM made its investigation, his co-author agreed that the revised paper should be retracted. The retraction, written by JOEM editor Paul Brandt-Rauf, said:

It has been brought to our attention that an article published in JOEM in the April 1997 issue by Zhang and Li failed to meet the journal's published editorial policy in effect at that time ... Specifically, financial and intellectual input to the paper by outside parties was not disclosed.

According to a 2005 article by Peter Waldman in The Wall Street Journal, ChemRisk had authored the article as consultants for PG&E (who were "being sued for alleged chromium pollution"). In addition to ChemRisk, Paustenbach later worked with Exponent; he and ChemRisk have "drawn the scrutiny of investigative journalists."

=== Steven Patierno ===
In September 2010, EPA scientists concluded that "even a small amount of a chemical compound commonly found in tap water may cause cancer." Steven Patierno, who had been an expert defense witness in seven chromium-6 lawsuits, was named by the EPA to the peer-review panel critiquing the agency's chromium-6 findings in a potential conflict of interest. A team of investigative journalists from the Center for Public Integrity made the disclosure in a series entitled Toxic Clout.

Patierno, an expert witness for PG&E, was deputy director of the Duke Cancer Institute and a former professor of pharmacology at the George Washington University School of Medicine and Health Sciences who had conducted a number of studies on chromium and said that "drinking low doses of chromium (VI) does not cause cancer." Patierno has co-authored papers with ChemRisk's Paustenbach, another expert witness for PG&E. In 1996, Paustenbach and Patierno co-authored an article saying that chromium 6 is not genotoxic.

== Film ==
The contamination and lawsuit became the subject of Erin Brockovich, a 2000 biographical film which starred Julia Roberts as Brockovich. The film was a critical success, with Roberts winning a Golden Globe Award for Best Actress in a Motion Picture – Drama and an Academy Award for Best Actress. Brockovich, who said that the film was about 98 percent accurate, made a cameo appearance.

== See also ==
- Environmental issues in the United States
- Toxic hotspot
- Flint water crisis
- Water pollution
- Merchants of Doubt
- Love Canal
