= Zahm =

Zahm is a surname. Notable people with the surname include:

- Albert Francis Zahm (1862–1954), aeronautical experimenter, professor, and aeronautical division chief of U.S. Library of Congress
- Charlie Zahm, American singer and player of Celtic, maritime and traditional American music
- John Augustine Zahm (1851–1921), Holy Cross priest, author, scientist, and South American explorer
- Lewis Zahm, Union Civil War officer from Ohio who was commissioned a colonel on August 6, 1861, for organizing the 3rd Ohio Cavalry
- Olivier Zahm (born 1964), French art critic, curator, fashion editor, art director and photographer
- Shelia Hoar Zahm, American cancer epidemiologist specialized in pesticides and cancer

== See also ==
- Zahm Andrist, mountain in the Bernese Alps in Switzerland
- Zahm Hall (University of Notre Dame), hall of residence on the campus of the University of Notre Dame
