= ChemRisk =

American scientific consulting firm

- Company type: Limited Liability Company
- Industry: Scientific consulting, Environmental and occupational health
- Founded: 1985; 41 years ago
- Founder: Dennis Paustenbach
- Fate: Acquired by Cardno (2012), became Cardno ChemRisk; Cardno later acquired by Stantec (2021)
- Headquarters: San Francisco, California
- Services: Toxicology, risk assessment, environmental consulting, expert witness services, litigation support
- Number of employees: 95 (2012)
- Parent: Cardno (2012–2021); Stantec (2021–present)

ChemRisk was a Delaware Limited Liability Company, a for-profit scientific consulting firm headquartered in San Francisco, California, that was part of Cardno (as Cardno ChemRisk) until Cardno was acquired by Stantec in 2021. ChemRisk founder and former president, Dennis Paustenbach, "has long been an expert witness and top consultant" to "scores of companies in the chemical, energy and medical products industries" facing lawsuits over products or environmental practices or product safety. Historical clients of ChemRisk included San Francisco-based utility Pacific Gas & Electric (PG&E) and BP. ChemRisk uses toxicology and risk assessment to measure the hazards of chemicals in soil, air, water, food, sediments and consumer products.

== Background ==
Paustenbach, who earned his PhD in environmental toxicology from Purdue University in 1982, created ChemRisk in 1985, with its headquarters in San Francisco, as an environmental consulting firm. Using assessments models regarding health risk, ChemRisk quantified risks of chemicals in "foods, water, air, sediment, soil, and consumer products". He worked at Eli Lilly in Indianapolis for two years before taking a masters in industrial hygiene. The new field of risk assessment was emerging in 1982, which integrated environmental toxicology and industrial hygiene. While working for Stauffer Chemical in Connecticut in the early 1980s, he "gained expertise in how chemicals were regulated" as he interacted with federal agencies through his job. He then worked for Syntex Pharmaceuticals in California's Silicon Valley. For three years Paustenbach worked on a project related to hexachlorophene, and dioxin which is its toxic byproduct. Hexachlorophene had previously been manufactured at a production facility in Times Beach, Missouri. "Large amounts of dioxin, a toxic byproduct of hexachlorophene, had been accidentally mixed with motor oil and sprayed on roads and land throughout the town, creating a huge liability as it became the country's most visible toxic waste site and forcing the town's entire population to re-settle elsewhere."

His 1986 Regulatory Toxicology and Pharmacology co-authored article, "A Critical Examination of Assumptions Used in Risk Assessments of Dioxin Contaminated Soil" (Note: According to the February 18, 2016 article "Brokers of junk science?" which is part of their 2016 series entitled Science for Sale the Center for Public Integrity (CPI), critics also claim that Critical Reviews in Toxicology and Regulatory Toxicology and Pharmacology are "purveyors of junk science. CPI said they published "misleading, industry-backed articles that threaten public health by playing down the dangers of well-known toxic substances such as lead and asbestos. The articles often are used to stall regulatory efforts and defend court cases.") was written in response to the Times Beach, Missouri crisis. In it the authors concluded that there were "flaws and shortcomings" in the original Times Beach risk assessment. Paustenbach noted that since 1984 studies had replaced previously held assumptions with new "quantitative evidence" about the estimation of exposures to 2,3,7,8-tetrachlorodibenzodioxin, more commonly known as dioxin. The article found flaws in the EPA studies and concluded that much higher levels of dioxins were "acceptable for residential and nonresidential areas." ChemRisk cited this article in their September 5, 1990 report commissioned by Hercules Inc.

In the early 1990s, ChemRisk operated as a division of the environmental engineering and consulting firm Rancho Cordova-based McLaren/Hart Environmental Engineering. Paustenbach was appointed as McLaren/Hart President and CEO in 1993. By 1998, McLaren/Hart—which operated from 1977 to 2000—had become the 11th largest environmental engineering firm in the area.

Paustenbach moved ChemRisk to Exponent from 1998 to 2003. In "mid-to-late 2003", he re-established ChemRisk. At that time some of operations that had been handled by Exponent were moved to the newly re-formed ChemRisk.

In his August 1, 2018 article in New Solutions: A Journal of Environmental and Occupational Health Policy, David Egilman said that the role of scientific consulting firms such as ChemRisk and Exponent, was litigation. These firms use "dose-reconstruction studies and policy arguments" in legal defenses using "multidisciplinary" teams that they include "scientists, physicians, engineers, and regulatory consultants". ChemRisk has described its role as one in which its "scientists and engineers" served as "technical advisors to lawyers in all aspects of environmental, occupational, toxic tort, and product liability litigation, including technical strategy development, providing scientific advice, expert testimony, selection and preparation of expert witnesses, assistance in cross-examining opponent's expert witnesses."

In his presentation to the March 1, 2007 Senate Subcommittee on Employment and Workplace Safety of the Committee on Health, Education, Labor, and Pensions hearing Examining Asbestos, Focusing on Efforts to Better Protect the Health of American Workers and their Families entitled "Asbestos: Still Lethal/Still Legal", veteran environmental consultant Barry Castleman, whose PhD was on asbestos, described how ChemRisk "seeded literature" on asbestos. He drew attention to the $120 million a year worth of asbestos brake linings and brake shoes" imported into the United States from "countries such as Brazil, China, Colombia, and Mexico, that use a lot of asbestos. Castleman said that by 2007, annually there were 10,000 Americans that died from the way asbestos was used in the past. Since 1972 Occupational Safety & Health Administration (OSHA) standards have required warning labels on brake and clutch parts made with asbestos. Ford Motor Company began to use them in 1980; Chrysler in 1984. General Motors had not documented when it started to use labels warning consumers of their brake parts about asbestos. OSHA never cited "any seller of these unlabeled products for violation of the standard." On July 26, 2006 OSHA posted a factsheet by industrial hygienist Ira Wainless on its website which explained the "mandatory appendix" of the 1994 OSHA "asbestos standard applicable to mechanics doing brake and clutch repair. Former OSHA chief John Henshaw, whose daughter Shannon Henshaw Gaffney had been hired by ChemRisk after she "obtained her doctorate in environmental science in 2004" was also listed as a "teaming partner" at ChemRisk in early 2005. John Henshaw had acted as an expert witness for a leading defendant, Honeywell International in their Bendix brakes lawsuit in 2004. Soon after Wainless' factsheet was posted, Henshaw contacted his former subordinates at OSHA urged his "former subordinates at OSHA to retract the factsheet and possibly redo it with additional references". On November 6, 2006, OSHA threatened to suspend Wainless for not including articles that had been "commissioned jointly by General Motors, Ford, and DaimlerChrysler, starting in 2001". Castleman said that "Shannon Henshaw Gaffney's services [had] appeared 21 times on Chemrisk asbestos litigation bills to the Big Three in 2004, totaling around $10,000." The Baltimore Sun reported that the OSHA brakes warning "survived the challenge." Castleman described how ChemRisk and Exponent provided litigation services as a "key" part of the defense strategy used by General Motors, Ford, and DaimlerChrysler. Castleman said that Exponent and Chemrisk authors' work has "technical shortcomings, such as selectivity in what was included in these reviews and what was not." He said their work was "solicited for the purpose of fighting personal injury claims brought by mechanics and their family members" as part of a "strategy of corporate defense lawyers, approaching and generously supporting the scientist-authors, most of whom had previously published little or nothing on asbestos. These publications were created to provide evidence that mechanics' asbestos exposures do not cause asbestos diseases. They were to be published by the best scientists money could buy."

== Merger with Cardno ==
By 2012, when Cardno, an "Australian infrastructure services group" acquired ChemRisk for US$33 million, the firm had a staff of 95 with expertise "across toxicology, industrial hygiene, epidemiology, ecotoxicology, environmental sciences, medicine, engineering, statistical analysis and risk assessment." Their client base then included "Johnson & Johnson, John Crane Group, Ford Motor Company and Union Carbide. Cardno would expand their consulting services to include "occupational health and safety, product sustainability, consumer product safety and contaminated site evaluations."

== Core expertise ==
By 2014, over two-thirds of Cadrno ChemRisk LLC contracts involved litigation while the rest were related to general consulting. Focus areas of expertise included "dioxin, asbestos, lead, Polychlorinated biphenyl (PCBs), chromium, benzene, methyl tert-butyl ether (MTBE), beryllium, cobalt, diacetyl, rubber particles, nanoparticles, pharmaceuticals and personal care products, Bis(2-ethylhexyl) phthalate (DEHP) and phthalates, Volatile organic compound (VOCs) & diesel exhaust, mercury, glycol ethers."

== Clients ==
When Cadrno merged with ChemRisk in 2012, clients included "Johnson & Johnson, John Crane Group, Ford Motor Company and Union Carbide. ChemRisk played a key role in the litigation defending their clients in cases that were followed extensively by the media. This included Pacific Gas and Electric Company in relation to 1993 lawsuit by the town of Hinkley regarding the Hexavalent chromium (Chromium-6) contamination of the groundwater, BP in relation to the 2010 Deepwater Horizon oil spill, and DuPont who hired ChemRick to evaluate environmental chemist Wilma Subra's findings that the 2005 flooding of the Dupont DeLisle Plant by 2005 Hurricane Katrina had released toxins that were harmful to human health.

== Hercules Incorporated ==
The contract with Hercules was the first major contract for Paustenbach and ChemRick. Paustenbach's 1986 paper had found flaws in the original Times Beach, Missouri risk assessment. Paustenbach noted that since 1984 studies had replaced previously held assumptions with new "quantitative evidence" about the estimation of exposures to 2,3,7,8-Tetrachlorodibenzodioxin, more commonly known as dioxins. ChemRisk cited this article in their September 5, 1990 report commissioned by Hercules Inc. Hercules was one of several chemical companies that had, from 1964 to 1968, manufactured and sold a "specific phenoxy herbicide, code named Agent Orange" at the request of the Department of Defense. Hercules was one of the nine manufacturers of Agent Orange that were sued by Vietnam veterans and their families starting in the 1970s. Litigation, which was consolidated into the 1980 "Agent Orange Product Liability Litigation said that the "veterans' exposure to dioxin, a toxic by product found in Agent Orange and believed by many to be hazardous, had caused various health problems." While the chemical companies involved said that based on recent scientific research, there was no link between Agent Orange and the veterans' medical problems. Seven of the chemical companies settled the class-action suit on May 7, 1984 out of court; they would compensate the veterans $180 million if they agreed to drop all claims against them.

== Colorado Department of Public Health and Environment ==
In 1990, ChemRisk was hired by the Colorado Department of Public Health and Environment to prepare Phase 1 (1990–1994) of the nine-year long Rocky Flats Historical Public Exposures Studies arising from the radioactive contamination from the Rocky Flats Plant. The Rocky Flats Plant located south of Boulder, Colorado was originally managed by Dow Chemical Company, then transferred to Rockwell in 1975. At that time, ChemRisk was a division of McLaren/Hart, a large environmental engineering and consulting firm.

== Pacific Gas & Electric chromium-6 pollution ==
In 1993, 650 residents of Hinkley, California, located 120 miles northeast of Los Angeles, filed a lawsuit against Pacific Gas and Electric Company (PG&E)—a San Francisco-based utility—accusing PG&E of contaminating the town's groundwater with chromium-6—causing a host of ailments, from various types of cancer to severe digestive disorders. From 1952 to 1966 PG&E dumped "roughly 370 million gallons of chromium-tainted wastewater" into unlined wastewater spreading pond around Hinkley. "Chromium 6 is one of the cheapest and most efficient commercially available corrosion inhibitors and was used by PG&E in their compressor stations." In 1996, "after arbitrators awarded $130.5 million in the first 39 cases, PG&E decided to settle for a whopping $333 million"— the largest settlement ever paid in a direct-action lawsuit in U.S. history. In 2000, the lawsuit became an international cause célèbre, when Erin Brockovich, the blockbuster movie was released. However the chromium remained and by 2013, the plume was "more than six miles long and two miles wide and gradually expanding."

In 1987 the Chinese scientist—Jian Dong Zhang published a paper reporting "significant association between chromium pollution of drinking water and higher rates of stomach cancer in villages in rural northeast China." PG&E hired ChemRisk as scientific consultants to disprove the allegations. ChemRisk purchased Zhang's original data, distorted the findings, rewrote the paper and published it in April 1997 Journal of Occupational and Environmental Medicine (JOEM)—the official publication of the American College of Occupational and Environmental Medicine—as a retraction of Zhang's 1987 paper. It was published under Zhang's name—who was then a retired Chinese government health officer, in spite of his written objection—and a second Chinese scientist, Shu Kun Li. Nonetheless, a subsequent publication corroborated the findings of the initial study.

The findings of the retracted 1997 JOEM article influenced drinking water regulation. The United States Environmental Protection Agency cited the article when it allowed continued use of chromium in a wood preservative. The Agency for Toxic Substances and Disease Registry discounted chromium-6 as an oral carcinogen because of this article.

In 1996 Paustenbach and Steven Patierno were co-authors of a highly-influential article arguing that chromium 6 is not genotoxic. "One of PG&E's key experts was Steven Patierno, a former professor of pharmacology at the George Washington University School of Medicine and Health Sciences who had conducted numerous studies on the metal. Patierno, now the deputy director of the Duke Cancer Institute, has been an expert defense witness in seven chromium lawsuits. He hasn't wavered in his view that drinking low doses of chromium (VI) does not cause cancer."

In 2006 JOEM undertook a six-month internal review of the 1997 retraction. By the time JOEM undertook their investigation, Zhang had already died but the second author agreed the paper should be retracted when JOEM. According to a 2005 article by Peter Waldman in The Wall Street Journal, ChemRisk had authored the article as consultants for PG&E who were "being sued for alleged chromium pollution."

"It has been brought to our attention that an article published in JOEM in the April 1997 issue by Zhang and Li failed to meet the journal's published editorial policy in effect at that time... Specifically, financial and intellectual input to the paper by outside parties was not disclosed."

— Paul Brandt-Rauf, Editor JOEM

In 2005, The Wall Street Journal reported on the influential role ChemRisk had played in changing the narrative about chromium by authoring the article as consultants for PG&E. In addition to ChemRisk, Paustenbach later worked with Exponent; Paustenbach and ChemRisk have "drawn the scrutiny of investigative journalists."

Since 1995 he Environmental Protection Agency and California's EPA concluded that drinking chromium causes cancer but they faced powerful opposition from the chemical industry in making its ruling official. Since 1995 John Morgan who works for the California Department of Public Health, has worked to debunk allegations that chromium pollution caused a cluster of cancer cluster in the Hinkley area. In 2013 the Center for Public Integrity (CPI) found glaring weaknesses in Morgan's analysis that challenge the validity of his findings. "In his first study, he dismisses what others see as a genuine cancer cluster in Hinkley. In his latest analysis, he excludes people who were exposed to the worst contamination." The year long investigation by CPI, Toxic Clout, produced in partnership with the PBS NewsHour, "unmasked the deep, sometimes hidden, connections entangling the chemical industry, scientists and regulators, revealing the industry's sway and the public's peril."

In 2013 California Environmental Protection Agency finally ruled that "drinking hexavalent chromium, the rust inhibitor that PG&E dumped in Hinkley, can cause cancer."

== GM, Ford, and DaimlerChrysler ==
Between 2001 and 2016, General Motors, Ford Motor Company, and DaimlerChrysler spent about $23 million for the "consulting and publishing services of Exponent and Chemrisk, and scientists including Dennis Paustenbach, Michael Goodman, David Garabrant, Mary Jane Teta, Patrick Hessel, Patrick Sheehan, Elizabeth Lu, Gregory Brorby, and Brent Finley.

== DuPont ==
Dupont hired ChemRisk—an "industry risk assessor"—to quantify the amount of C8 that had been released from Dupont's Parkersburg, West Virginia-based Washington Works plant between 1951 and 2003. ChemRisk's 2004 report said that the over 1.7 million pounds of perfluorooctanoic acid, also known as C8—which was used to produce Teflon—had been "dumped, poured and released" into the environment.

In 2005 DuPont hired ChemRisk's Houston, Texas branch of the "environment and health consulting firm" to review the work of environmental chemist Wilma Subra. They challenged Subra's findings, whose work showed that heavy metals and other pollutants that had accumulated over time at the DuPont DeLisle Plant were stirred up when the facility was flooded by Hurricane Katrina. ChemRisk researcher Mark Harris argued that the toxicants such as arsenic that Subra found in soil samples, did not pose a health risk. Subra found higher levels of dioxin and chromium levels in sediment samples from the facility. ATSDR found that in 2004, "DuPont DeLisle’s titanium dioxide plant reported the third highest amount of dioxin-like compounds in EPA’s Toxic Release Inventory (TRI). In 2005, the Hurricane Katrina storm surge flooded significant portions of the plant." However, there was no threat to human health. By 2005, almost 2000 people had sued DuPont claiming dioxin emissions from Dupont Delisle Plant in Mississippi, had caused cancers. In August 2005, Glen Strong, an oyster fisherman with the rare blood cancer multiple myeloma, was awarded $14 million from DuPont, but the ruling was overturned June 5, 2008, by a Mississippi jury who found DuPont's plant had no connection to Mr. Strong's disease. DuPont's DeLisle plant is one of three titanium dioxide facilities produce the most dioxins in the United States, according to the US EPA's Toxic Release Inventory. DuPont maintains its operations are safe and environmentally responsible.

== BP's Deepwater Horizon oil spill ==
In September 2011 ChemRisk published an article entitled "Study by Leading Scientific Consulting Firm Finds No Evidence of Health Dangers for Gulf Coast Cleanup Workers" in the journal Environmental Science and Technology concluding that off-shore workers who cleaned up BP's oil between April and October 2010 found that exposure to "airborne benzene, toluene, ethylbenzene and xylene (BTEX) fell well below the Permissible Exposure Limits (PELs) established by the U.S. Occupational Safety and Health Administration (OSHA)." In 2013 Cherri Foytlin and her colleague, Karen Savage authored article about ChemRisk in Huffington Post.

Faced with accusations that Paustenbacn and ChemRisk had "slanted scientific findings to suit its clients"—ChemRisk launched a libel suit against Cherri Foytlin and her colleague, Karen Savage who had co-authored an article about ChemRisk in Huffington Post. The case was thrown out of a New York court so ChemRisk launched another libel suit in Massachusetts. When ChemRisk attempted to withdraw the suit, Foytlin and Savage filed that ChemRisk "filing, Ms. Foytlin and Ms. Savage argued that ChemRisk, a unit of Cardno ChemRisk, should not be allowed simply to withdraw its lawsuit. Instead, they say the company should pay their lawyers, who have represented them on a pro bono basis, and issue an apology for dragging them through years of litigation."

In their article, Foytlin and Savage "raised questions about a 2011 ChemRisk study that found no link between chemicals released during the 2010 explosion of the Deepwater Horizon oil rig in the Gulf of Mexico, and health problems reported by cleanup workers." They claimed that "ChemRisk has a long, and on at least one occasion fraudulent, history of defending big polluters, using questionable ethics to help their clients avoid legal responsibility for their actions."

ChemRisk filed a lawsuit against Cherri Foytlin and Karen Savage, the two environmental activists whose article "ChemRisk, BP and Purple Strategies: A Tangled Web of Not-So-Independent Science" was posted on the Huffington Post site. ChemRisk lost the case based on Massachusetts Anti-SLAPP Statute—"legislation that provides a special motion to dismiss lawsuits designed to chill public participation in government."

== Johnson & Johnson ==
As reported by the St. Louis Record, in the lawsuit before the St. Louis City Circuit Court, 22 women sued Johnson & Johnson saying that J&J baby powder had caused their ovarian cancers. Mark Lanier, the attorney for the plaintiffs challenged a witness for Johnson & Johnson—ChemRisk's Dana Hollins, a "board certified industrial hygienist". Hollins said that studies by an expert witness for the plaintiffs—Dr. David Egilman—were "flawed". Egilman said that "960 studies showed the presence of asbestos in J&J talc powder out of 1,400 studies conducted." Morton Dubin, J&J's attorney said that Egilman had "inflated his exposure calculations". Hollins said that Egilman had not performed "his analysis scientifically on sound data." Lanier said that Hollins who has a master's degree in public health and who was introduced as a scientist—an "industrial hygienist as in epidemiologist" was much less qualified to speak on the issue of asbestos exposure than witnesses for the plaintiffs such as Egilman and Jacqueline Moline, who is the director of the World Trade Center Medical Monitoring Committee. According to the American Association for the Advancement of Science (AAAS) Science Magazine, Egilman's contribution to the trial was "decisive". He interviewed the women regarding how often they applied the talc. With his student researchers, they also thoroughly examined "thousands of pages of internal J&J documents unearthed during the litigation" revealing that "J&J found no asbestos in the talc because its tests were not sensitive enough". Egilman compared this to "trying to weigh a needle on a bathroom scale." The jury awarded the "16 surviving women and the families of the six who had died" with $4.69 billion—the "largest award in Missouri's history." By 2019, John & Jonson faced over 14,000 lawsuits "alleging their talc products contained asbestos and caused cancer in women." Johnson & Johnson deny the claims.
