= Debra T. Silverman =

American biostatistician and cancer epidemiologist

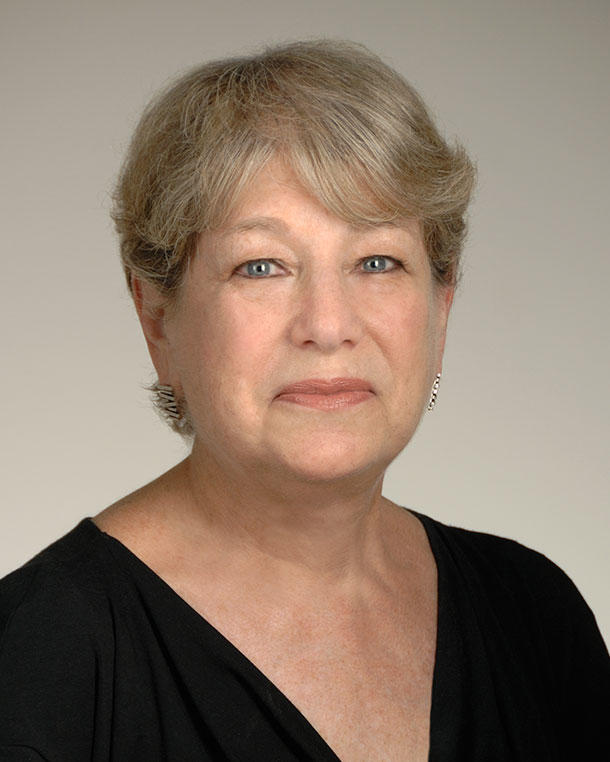
- Born: December 31, 1948 (age 77)
- Education: Brooklyn College; Johns Hopkins Bloomberg School of Public Health; Harvard T.H. Chan School of Public Health
- Scientific career
- Fields: Biostatistics, cancer epidemiology
- Workplaces: National Cancer Institute
- Academic advisors: James Tonascia

Debra Toby Silverman (born December 31, 1948) is an American biostatistician and epidemiologist specialized in bladder cancer epidemiology and the carcinogenicity of diesel exhaust. Silverman is the chief of the occupational and environmental epidemiology branch at the National Cancer Institute.

== Life ==
Silverman was born December 31, 1948. She completed a B.A. in Mathematics at Brooklyn College in June 1970. Silverman earned a Sc.M. in health statistics from the Johns Hopkins Bloomberg School of Public Health. Her master's degree was funded by a U.S. Public Health Service traineeship. Her 1972 thesis was titled Maternal smoking and birth weight. Her advisor was James Tonascia. Professor George W. Comstock had suggested the idea for her thesis and allowed Silverman to use data collected during the 1963 Washington County, Maryland census. When Silverman completed her training in Baltimore, she interviewed for a number of positions at the National Institutes of Health (NIH) and was not sure which institute to join. Silverman asked Abraham Lilienfeld, who was chair of epidemiology at Johns Hopkins University, what he thought. And he said, "Oh, go to cancer. That’s where all the money was." This was in 1972; the National Cancer Act was passed in 1971 and the field was growing tremendously. Silverman joined the National Cancer Institute (NCI) as a biostatistician in 1972.

After three years at NCI, Silverman decided to go back to school to get her doctorate. NCI paid her tuition and full salary. In 1981, she completed a Sc.D. in epidemiology from the Harvard T.H. Chan School of Public Health. Her doctoral studies built on previous bladder cancer epidemiologic research conducted by her professor Philip Cole and her mentor Robert N. Hoover. Her dissertation was titled, A case-control study of lower-urinary-tract cancer in Detroit. Silverman returned to NCI and has worked as a cancer epidemiologist since 1983. During the mid-1980s into the 1990s, her supervisor, Joseph F. Fraumeni Jr. allowed Silverman, and her colleagues Shelia Hoar Zahm and Patricia Hartge to all work part-time so they could raise families. She was part-time for 16 years, having her first daughter in 1986. Alan S. Morrison served as an additional mentor of Silverman.

Silverman is chief of the NCI Occupational and Environmental Epidemiology Branch (OEEB) within the Division of Cancer Epidemiology and Genetics (DCEG). In November 2024, Silverman will retire from the NCI after 16 years as Director of the OEEB.

She specializes in bladder cancer epidemiology and the carcinogenicity of diesel exhaust.

== Awards ==
Silverman has received awards, including the Harvard School of Public Health Alumni Award of Merit for the scientific importance and public health impact of her research; the PHS Special Recognition Award for research on environmental determinants of bladder and other cancers; the American Occupational Medical Association Merit in Authorship Award for her contributions to a paper on a job/exposure linkage system; the NIH Director’s Award, the NCI Special Act Award, the NIOSH Alice Hamilton Science Award for Occupational Safety and Health, and the British Occupational Hygiene Society Award in recognition of her work on the Diesel Exhaust in Miners Study; the NIH Merit Award for her contributions to pancreatic cancer research; and the DCEG Exemplary Service and Investigator Award. Silverman is an elected member of the American Epidemiological Society and a Fellow of the American College of Epidemiology.
