= Dennis Paustenbach =

Dennis J. Paustenbach PhD, CIH, DABT, (born Oct 29, 1952) is an American scientist, businessman, researcher, and author. Dennis is the senior scientist and head of the risk assessment group at TRC Companies, which is an international consulting, engineering, and construction management firm. He is the founder and former president of ChemRisk, a consulting firm specializing in the use of toxicology, exposure science, epidemiology, and health physics to characterize the hazards of chemicals in soil, air, water, food, sediments and consumer products. For about 4 years, Paustenbach was a Group Vice-President at Exponent, a publicly traded consulting firm.

Paustenbach has published approximately 320 peer-reviewed papers in scientific journals, about 55 book chapters, and has presented nearly 350 papers at various scientific conferences during his career. His widely read textbook on health risk assessment is in its third edition (issued June 2024). He has given expert testimony in many courts, often on behalf of corporations being sued, regarding the health hazards posed by dioxins, talc, asbestos, benzene, lead, chromium, beryllium, formaldehyde, carbon monoxide, cobalt, chlorinated solvents, kratom (and other herbals), PFAS chemicals, food additives, and other chemicals.

== Early life, education, and work ==
Paustenbach was born in Tarentum, Pennsylvania (a Pittsburgh suburb) in 1952. He left his hometown after first grade and moved to Akron, Ohio, where he attended St. Matthews. His family later moved to Strasburg, Ohio, which was in a rural setting adjacent to many Amish communities, where he graduated from high school.

In 1974, Paustenbach graduated from the Rose Polytechnic Institute with a BS in Chemical Engineering (now Rose-Hulman Institute) where he was a Kemper Scholar.

Paustenbach worked at Eli Lilly and Company, a pharmaceutical firm, as a process engineer for two years. Paustenbach earned a master's degree in Industrial Hygiene and Toxicology from University of Michigan in 1977. He then worked at Eli Lilly for another 3 years. Meanwhile, Paustenbach earned a master's degree in counseling psychology from Indiana State University in 1978. Paustenbach then earned his PhD in environmental toxicology from Purdue University in 1982. While studying for his PhD, he founded the undergraduate/graduate programs in industrial hygiene at Purdue where he taught industrial hygiene, environmental epidemiology, and industrial toxicology.

== Career ==
After completing his PhD, Paustenbach became the head of risk assessment at Stauffer Chemical in Westport, Connecticut. He also worked at Syntex Pharmaceuticals.

=== Consulting ===
Paustenbach twice started the environmental consulting firm, ChemRisk. The firm applied the principles of health risk assessment to quantitatively characterize the risk to humans of chemicals in foods, water, air, sediment, soil, and consumer products. In 1987, ChemRisk became a joint venture with McLaren Engineering. ChemRisk grew to have about 125 persons in 10 locations in the U.S. and Australia between 1987-1995. In 1993, Paustenbach was selected to be the president and CEO of McLaren-Hart Environmental Engineering, a national firm with 15 offices and 600 employees. He was the youngest CEO of a major engineering firm in this industry.

In the 1980s and 1990s, Paustenbach conducted research into the dioxins and furans. Among his first major undertakings was characterizing the health hazards posed by dioxin contaminated soil including the site in Times Beach, Missouri and 37 other related sites. In the 1990s, he conducted research evaluating the hazards posed by occupational exposure to pharmaceuticals, benzene, nitrosamines, beryllium, and formaldehyde. Also, in the 1990s, he published many studies which evaluated the exposure and health hazards associated with exposure to hexavalent chromium which were pertinent to Hinkley, CA and Hudson County, NJ. He was the lead scientist in conducting dose-reconstructions at several nuclear arsenals: Rocky Flats, Los Alamos, Oak Ridge, and Hanford (the largest assessments ever conducted). From about 2000 to 2024, he performed more than 1,000 risk assessments on many different topics including asbestos exposure of auto mechanics and tradesmen, benzene exposure in refineries, lead in consumer products, arsenic in wine, perfluorinated chemicals in groundwater, MCHM in drinking water, hydrocarbons in drinking water, and PFAS in drinking water. Paustenbach and colleagues developed many of the earliest guidelines for identifying safe levels of exposure in the workplace and multi-pathway exposure assessment methods. Later, he conducted research involving the release of cobalt and chromium from medical devices. ChemRisk was sold to Cardno Engineering of Australia in 2014.

In April 2019, Dennis founded and became president of Paustenbach and Associates. The consulting firm had 3 offices, 19 full-time professionals, and several “at will” professionals. In August 2024, the firm was purchased by TRC, an engineering firm, and Paustenbach became a risk assessment group leader and chief scientist.

=== Teaching ===
Paustenbach has worked as an adjunct professor at seven universities: the University of Texas (Houston), Purdue University, University of Bridgeport, University of Massachusetts (Amherst), University of California at Irvine School of Medicine (clinical professor of Occupational Medicine), University of Michigan (Ann Arbor) and, currently, the University of Kansas Medical School (Kansas City).

He was awarded an honorary Doctor of Science degree from Purdue University in 2006 and a Doctor of Engineering from the Rose-Hulman Institute of Technology in 2007.

=== Books ===
- The Risk Assessment of Environmental and Human Health Hazards: A Textbook of Case Studies (1989)
- Human and Ecological Risk Assessment: Theory and Practice (2002).

=== Awards and honors ===
- 1992 - Howard Kusnetz Award
- 1997 - Outstanding Risk Practitioner by the Society for Risk Analysis
- 2002 - Arnold Lehman Award by Society of Toxicology
- 2009 - Fellow of the American Industrial Hygiene Association
- 2010 - Henry Smyth Award for Contributions in Toxicology by American Conference of Governmental Industrial Hygienists
- 2010 - Ed Baier Award by the American Industrial Hygiene Association
- 2011 - Fellow of the Society for Risk Analysis
- 2015 - Outstanding graduate of the School of Health Sciences.
- 2016 – Best Published Paper on Medical Devices by Society of Toxicology
- 2024 – Shubik Award for outstanding contribution to toxicology by the Toxicology Forum

== Industry consulting ==
=== Chromium ===
Paustenbach and his consulting firms have "drawn the scrutiny of investigative journalists." Paustenbach has been hired as an expert witness and consultant for a number of companies facing lawsuits over products, environmental practices, and/or product safety. While Paustenbach was the director of for-profit scientific consulting firm ChemRisk, its clients included PG&E and BP. Paustenbach testified that PG&E paid ChemRick about $1.5 million for litigation support.

In 1996, Paustenbach suggested that the Chrome Coalition, the chromium industry's trade group at the time, should fill a "data gap" to forestall rulemaking so that OSHA does not reduce the allowable amount of chromium dust in workplaces. That same year, Paustenbach and Steven Patierno co-authored an article claiming that chromium 6 is not genotoxic.

Paustenbach was at the center of a publishing scandal involving the research of Chinese scientist Jian Dong Zhang. In 2005, the Wall Street Journal ran a front-page story questioning the role of Paustenbach and his company ChemRisk amidst litigation regarding Hinkley groundwater contamination, on which the movie Erin Brockovich was based.

Zhang's 1987 study reported an association between chromium pollution of drinking water and higher rates of stomach cancer in residents of three villages in Liaoning Province (in rural northeastern China) who lived near a chromium-ore smelter and drank tainted water for years. The study linked chromium-contaminated groundwater with a range of public-health illnesses.

ChemRisk was hired to reanalyze data from the study; the reanalysis was then published in a new study in 1997 under the names of two Chinese researchers without any mention of ChemRisk’s involvement. The revised study was then promoted for the next decade in court cases and regulatory filings. According to the Center for Public Integrity, "[Zhang's] revised [1997] study—which did not reveal the involvement of PG&E or [ChemRisk] scientists—helped persuade California health officials to delay new drinking water standards for chromium." The EPA cited the article when it allowed the continued use of chromium in a wood preservative, and the Agency for Toxic Substances and Disease Registry discounted chromium 6 as an oral carcinogen because of the revised study.

In 2006, after the Wall Street Journal article, the Zhang study was retracted by the Journal of Occupational and Environmental Medicine. The Journal conducted a six-month internal review of the previous 1997 retraction, starting that:

"It has been brought to our attention that an article published in JOEM in the April 1997 issue by Zhang and Li failed to meet the journal's published editorial policy in effect at that time ... Specifically, financial and intellectual input to the paper by outside parties was not disclosed."

The retraction was written by JOEM editor Paul Brandt-Rauf. Although Zhang had died by the time the JOEM made its investigation, his co-author agreed that the revised paper should be retracted. Environmental groups such as the Environmental Working Group have since sought to have Paustenbach censured by the Society of Toxicology.

According to Allan Hirsch, CalEPA's 2008 review of Zhang's original 1987 paper agreed with his findings that the rates of stomach cancer in the three villages were significantly higher than those in the province.

One of Paustenbach's textbooks claimed that he helped save industry hundreds of millions of dollars in cleanup costs for chromium pollution in New Jersey. Paustenbach testified that his firm was paid more than $7 million for such efforts.

=== Asbestos ===
Dr. Paustenbach has served as an expert witness in asbestos litigation, primarily on behalf of corporations being sued for allegedly causing asbestos-related disease, since 2000. From 2002 to 2012, he had published 18 papers on asbestos, was "frequently retained as an expert by automotive manufacturers," and had testified on their behalf.

In 2006, Paustenbach spoke at a Canadian Chrysotile Institute conference (formerly the Asbestos Institute) about "dose-reconstruction" studies and their utility in asbestos litigation, explaining that a corporation hiring a consulting firm to complete a $250,000 to $500,000 study was a "drop in the bucket" compared to the $4 million it costs to defend a case at trial.

In 2016, the Center for Public Integrity published an investigation that highlighted Paustenbach’s work for Ford Motor Company to downplay the dangers of asbestos in car brake pads. While vice president of Exponent, Paustenbach spoke with former Ford Motor Company attorney Darrell Grams, who explained that Ford had been losing lawsuits filed by former auto mechanics who alleged that asbestos-containing brakes gave them mesothelioma. Paustenbach agreed to study mesothelioma's association with brake work. As of 2015, Exponent had made $18.2 million from the endeavor, and Cardno ChemRisk had made $21 million. As of 2015, Ford had spent nearly $40 million on funding journal articles and expert testimony concluding that there is no evidence that brake mechanics are at increased risk of developing mesothelioma.

Paustenbach and Associates was first retained on behalf of U.S. Steel in March 2021; at least one of his resulting publications was based on industrial hygiene reports provided by the company's lawyers.

The Asbestos Disease Awareness Organization (ADAO) opposed Paustenbach's nomination as a potential peer reviewer for the 2023 White Paper on the Quantitative Human Health Approach to be Applied in the Risk Evaluation for Asbestos Part 2 under the Toxic Substances Control Act (TSCA). Among other concerns, ADAO noted that:

"Dr. Paustenbach has a long history of involvement with industries that have a vested interest in the continued use of asbestos. His prior affiliations and consulting work for chemical and environmental risk assessment firms, as well as his association with the Essential Minerals Association, American Chemistry Council, and other industry groups, raise concerns about potential conflicts of interest that could compromise the integrity of the peer review process."

=== Benzene ===
Paustenbach and his consulting companies have been accused of conducting "research [that] starts with the desired conclusions." One such example occurred in 1990 when Paustenbach was hired by the American Petroleum Institute (API) to investigate benzene's carcinogenic potential:

"McLaren/ChemRisk is pleased to provide this proposal to develop an alternative cancer potency estimate for benzene. It is our understanding that API would like us to develop a succinct, yet scientifically compelling, integrated position statement to be used in comments to the state of North Carolina and as a possible springboard for future analyses that could be presented to US EPA and the State of California. . . .

EPA and OSHA considered benzene to cause all types of leukemia in their development of cancer potency estimates for benzene. . . .The objective of this task is to develop a succinct, compelling position that presents evidence that AML is the only type of leukemia induced by benzene exposure (task 4.1). A meeting with Dr. Richard Irons will be needed in order to discuss the molecular basis for benzene-induced AML (task 4.2).

Deliverable to the API benzene task force: Draft manuscript, suitable for publication in Fundamental and Applied Toxicology. Comments from the Task Force and Dr. Irons will be incorporated into a final document."

=== Flame retardants ===
In 2012, the Chicago Tribune published an investigative story critical of Paustenbach’s work on the health risks of flame retardants, describing him as industry's "go-to person" when "chemicals receive bad publicity." The article also noted Paustenbach's work on behalf of tobacco industry lawyers.

== Philanthropy ==
In recent years, Paustenbach was involved in fundraising for Bellarmine College Preparatory, The Sacred Heart Schools, Purdue University, The University of Michigan, The Jackson Laboratory for Genomic Medicine, Peninsula Bridge of Menlo Park (California), The Roux Institute for AI and Genomic Medicine (Maine), The Alan Alda Center for Communicating Science at Stony Brook University, Indiana Landmarks, the Mayo Clinic, the Enfield Shaker Village/Museum (New Hampshire) and The Shakers of Sabbathday Lake (Maine).

== See also ==
- Hinkley groundwater contamination
- Industry funding of academic research
- Conflicts of interest in academic publishing
