= Hartge (surname) =

Hartge is a surname. Notable people with the name include:

- Charles E. Hartge (1865–1918), American architect
- Ethaline Hartge Cortelyou (1909–1997), American chemist and scientific technical writer
- Patricia Hartge, American cancer epidemiologist

== See also ==
- Hartge, German car tuning company
