= Joem =

Joem may refer to:

- Joem Bascon (born 1986), Filipino actor
- Journal of Occupational and Environmental Medicine, peer-reviewed monthly journal
- Joem, the only survivor of the British NER Class E1 steam locomotives
