= Toxic hotspot =

Location heavily affected by pollution

Toxic hotspots are locations where emissions from specific sources such as water or air pollution may expose local populations to elevated health risks, such as cancer. These emissions contribute to cumulative health risks of emissions from other sources nearby. Urban, highly populated areas around pollutant emitters such as old factories and waste storage sites are often toxic hotspots.

== Soil contamination hotspots ==
The 1984 Bhopal disaster in India, the world's worst chemical disaster, is a prime example of a significant toxic hotspot. The toxic gas leaked from the understaffed Union Carbide plant killed up to 20,000 people and left 120,000 others chronically ill. Bhopal continues to face pollution problems from the abandoned factory today.

== Air pollution hotspots ==
Air pollution hotspots are areas where air pollution emissions expose individuals to increased negative health effects. Hotspots denote areas in which a population's exposure to pollution and estimated health risks are high. Air pollution hotspots are particularly common in highly populated, urban areas, where there may a combination of stationary sources (e.g. industrial facilities) and mobile sources (e.g. cars and trucks) of pollution. Emissions from these sources can cause respiratory disease, childhood asthma, cancer, and other health problems. A fine particulate matter such as diesel soot, which contributes to more than 3.2 million premature deaths around the world each year, is a significant problem. It is very small and can lodge itself within the lungs and enter the bloodstream. Diesel soot is concentrated in densely populated areas, and one in six people in the U.S. live near a diesel pollution hot spot.

While air pollution hotspots affect a variety of populations, some groups are more likely to be located in hotspots. Previous studies have shown disparities in exposure to pollution by race and/or income (cite one of the early readings from our syllabus, e.g. Mohai & Pellow, or Saha). For example, the production of PM 2.5 air pollution mainly comes from the consumption of good by white people while this pollution is disproportionally inhaled by communities of color. Hazardous land uses (toxic storage and disposal facilities, manufacturing facilities, major roadways) tend to be located where property values and income levels are low. Low socioeconomic status can be a proxy for other kinds of social vulnerability, including race, a lack of ability to influence regulatory permitting and a lack of ability to move to neighborhoods with less environmental pollution. For example, the production of PM 2.5 air pollution mainly comes from the production of goods consumed by white people while this pollution is disproportionally inhaled by communities of color. Therefore, these communities bear a disproportionate burden of environmental pollution known as pollution inequity and are more likely to face health risks such as cancer or asthma.

Studies show that patterns in race and income disparities not only indicate a higher exposure to pollution but also higher risk of adverse health outcomes. Communities characterized by low socioeconomic status and racial minorities can be more vulnerable to cumulative adverse health impacts resulting from elevated exposure to pollutants than more privileged communities. Blacks and Latinos generally face more pollution than whites and Asians, and low-income communities bear a higher burden of risk than affluent ones. Racial discrepancies are particularly distinct in suburban areas of the South and metropolitan areas of the West. Residents in public housing, who are generally low-income with poor access to health care and cannot move to healthier neighborhoods, are highly affected by nearby refineries and chemical plants.

Community groups and academic researchers have argued the unequal distribution of pollution on the poor and communities of color is an "environmental justice".

Policy makers and researchers concerned with improving environmental justice for communities situated next to major sources of air pollution have developed a number of regulatory tools to identify air pollution hotspots. The EPA, for example, utilizes their Risk-Screening Environmental Indicators (RSEI) model to identify hotspots from a score of 3 to 15, with higher scores indicating closer proximity to hazards. Individual states have also taken steps to improve identification and surveillance. California's AB 2588 Air Toxics "Hot Spots" Program, enacted in 1987, seeks to collect emission data, determine health risks, and notify local residents of major risks. By identifying hotspots regulators hope these tools will help them reduce pollution and inform nearby populations through the health risk assessments of individual pollutants and facilities that are summed in each zone to develop a total lifetime cancer risk. Air pollution hot spots are also at issue in pollution-trading programs, such as cap-and-trade systems designed to control pollution. These programs can potentially exacerbate effects from air pollution hotspots if the differences in chemical hazards are ignored. These programs also cause pollution to be mitigated towards where credit-buying firms are located. Factories can purchase emissions reduction credits from other firms, which leads to concentrated areas of pollution since facilities that sell their credits are "exporting" their pollution to firms more likely to buy credits. However, some studies have noted that these claims have not materialized. Evan Ringquist, a professor at Indiana University of Public and Environmental Affairs, states that there is little empirical evidence to suggest the emergence of hotspots. A Cedars-Sinai study found that prolonged exposure to particulate matter in air pollution in the Los Angeles Basin triggered inflammation and the appearance of cancer-related genes in the brains of rats.

=== West Oakland, California ===
Located in the East San Francisco Bay, the neighborhood of West Oakland is home to mainly low-income African American and Latino residents who are exposed to a disproportionate amount of airborne toxins as compared to the rest of the surrounding Alameda County. West Oakland's close proximity to highways and the Port of Oakland leave residents highly exposed to pollutants caused by moving and stationary sources of diesel pollution, thus leaving them at higher risk for health complications such as asthma and even shorter life expectancy than surrounding neighborhoods averages.

High emissions of toxic chemicals and airborne particulate matter in West Oakland that cause health issues are due to diesel fuels used for transportation in the Port of Oakland and surrounding highways. Traffic and transportation-related air pollutants include carbon monoxide, nitrogen dioxide, black carbon, and diesel particulate matter. Residents are more exposed to harmful pollutants compared to other areas of the Bay Area and Oakland and therefore more at risk for harmful health effects. Compared to the State of California, West Oakland produces 90 times more diesel emission particulates per square mile per day. These pollutants have detrimental health effects such as asthma and reduced life expectancy while putting children at higher susceptibility for health complications.

Inequitable economic, residential, and environmental conditions in this low-income community of color leave residents of West Oakland with poor and inequitable health outcomes. African-American and Latino children of 10–18 years in West Oakland are more susceptible to onset lung defects such as asthma. According to Alameda County Vital Statistics, an African American child born in West Oakland is expected to live 14 fewer years than a white child born in the more wealthy Oakland Hills. Children 5 and under in west Oakland visit the emergency room for asthma three times more often than children in the county as a whole.

There are multiple efforts and strategies to spur legislation for equitable environmental conditions in low-income communities. There are many environmental justice groups and organizations in the Bay Area that encourage community participation in pursuing environmental justice. For example, data is collected by a Community-based participatory research (CBPR) and collaborated with West Oakland Environmental Indicators Project (WOEIP) in order to find effective and accurate findings to prove injustice and eventually spur reform in environmental policy. These research efforts can be used to document and communicate trends in air quality in West Oakland to policymakers. Effectiveness of efforts by these groups are multiplied by and increasing availability of environmental poverty lawyers who empower legislation in the legal system.

=== Richmond, California ===
Richmond, located in the San Francisco Bay Area, is an evolving, multi-cultural community that has transformed itself from an over-polluted industrial town to a pioneer in an environmental justice movement. The city has been host to numerous oil refineries, including the Chevron Corporation refinery, which opened in 1901 under the ownership of Pacific Coast Oil. The Chevron Refinery is a leading source of air quality violations in the state of California. Richmond residents are also exposed to pollution from the Santa Fe train line and the presence of heavy traffic and diesel trucks along the Richmond Parkway. However, residents are most concerned with air pollution health impacts from the Chevron Refinery. In 1999, Richmond measure significantly higher on Air Quality Indices (AQI) (an indicator of how polluted is air is) compared to national level. Air pollution emission from the Chevron refinery includes benzene, ethylbenzene, toluene, xylene, nitrous dioxide, and sulfur dioxide, which are known to cause elevated cancer risks and respiratory illness. Rates of child and adult asthma are especially elevated among Richmond residents.

Richmond residents have struggled to improve local air quality. The city has a significant non-white, low-income population. According to 2010 U.S. Census, of Richmond's 103,701 person populations, "one in six residents lives below the federal poverty level, and more than eight in 10 are people of color. In North Richmond, next to one of the nation's largest refineries, 97 percent of residents are non-white and nearly one in four live in poverty". Low-income communities have differential access to political power, and their collective political voice is often less able to contest decisions impacting industrial operations. The combination of poverty, poor access to clean air, and poor political power can result in inequality in which communities of color bear a disproportionate burden of pollution and, therefore, suffer from greater environmental health risks.

Because Richmond is an air pollution hotspot, Richmond residents have applied different strategies since the 1980s to try to improve local air quality. The first EJ movement in the area started in the late 1980s, when the activist tried to stop construction of a garbage incinerator near North Richmond. Sixteen years later, local citizen utilizes "Bucket Brigades" to document a handful of criteria air pollutants such as sulfur dioxide (SO_{2}), carbon monoxide (CO), nitrogen dioxide (NO_{2}), and ozone (O_{3}).This study involves citizens to actively collecting the samples of emissions from Chevron's refineries, especially during accidents, fires, leaks, and explosions. The "sniffers" alert the "samplers" to collect the air samples when they notice a problem. The "samplers" then contact the Coordinator to check the bucket and perform the paperwork before submitting the samples to the Laboratory, in which the results will be reported to CBE, an environmental justice organization. The "Bucket Brigades" did not only raise the awareness local citizens to fight against the air pollution in their area but also their participation.

As the number of activists and participants grew in numbers, their position in the battle against environmental injustice was further fortified with the election Green-party mayor of Richmond, Gayle McLaughlin, as well as three new council members sympathetic to their cause in 2008. In July 2008, despite the council failing to halt the Chevron's plan to build more refineries in the area due to rising gasoline prices during that time, the council succeeded to acquire $61 million from the oil company for community programs.

Due to great forces from the local communities and fellow EJ activists in Richmond area, Chevron has been making progress to embrace cleaner environment. In 2005, local activists managed to convince Bay Area Air Quality Management District to tighten the air pollution regulations by increasing the frequency of fines of facility incidents. Since then, Chevron has been flaring 10 times less than before. On top of that, Chevron has invested $150 million for building gas turbine in order to reduce air emission, increase energy efficiency, as well as provide most electrical and steam power Chevron requires to operate.

=== Wilmington, Los Angeles ===
Bonnoris noted, "The environmental justice movement posits that the distribution of environmental harms and benefits should be fairly apportioned among all communities". As Bonnoris argued, the burden of air pollution is disproportionally distributed among communities based on their racial, social or economic status. Disproportion distribution of air pollution among communities can be a violation of the Equal Protection Clause of the Constitution because it violates equal protection of residents' public health.

Los Angeles is known for the nation's worst air quality and its "sharp inequalities in environmental exposures". Wilmington, Los Angeles is a neighborhood located on the southern part of Los Angeles, California. 54,512 people live in Wilmington, the median household income is $40,627, about 86% of them are Latino, and only 5.1% of Wilmington residents 25 or older have a four-year degree.

Wilmington may bear more environmental burden than other communities in Los Angeles because it is located next to several sources of air pollution. For example, Wilmington has "the highest concentration of refineries in the State". Emissions from refineries in Wilmington include carbon dioxide, sulfur dioxide, and benzene. Wilmington has higher concentration of diesel particulate matter due to emissions from diesel trucks from the ports of Los Angeles and Long Beach. The risks associated with diesel are often underestimated, since existing epidemiological studies cannot isolate exposure to diesel PM. However, exposure to diesel particulate matter can cause "irritation to the eyes, nose, throat and lungs", asthma, "exhaust immunological effects", and cancer.

Several NGOs have worked to improve the accuracy of Wilmington air-quality data and air quality in order to protect approximately 1400 children who live in or visit schools or childcare facilities at Wilmington. The environmental group "Coalition For a Safe Environment" installed a air-pollution monitoring devices on the residential buildings in Wilmington in order to prove that emissions from local oil refineries and diesel trucks to the ports pollute the air in Wilmington, disproportionately affecting Wilmington residents to suffer from health problems including lung diseases and respiratory diseases.

== Groundwater contamination ==
The town of Hinkley, California, located in the Mojave Desert, had its groundwater contaminated with hexavalent chromium starting in 1952, resulting in a legal case against Pacific Gas & Electric (PG&E) and a multimillion-dollar settlement in 1996. The legal case was dramatized in the film Erin Brockovich, released in 2000.

PG&E operates a compressor station in Hinkley for natural gas transmission pipelines. The natural gas has to be re-compressed approximately every 350 miles (560 km), and the station uses large cooling towers to cool the gas after it has been compressed. Between 1952 and 1966, the water used in these cooling towers contained hexavalent chromium – now recognized as a carcinogen – to prevent rust in the machinery. The water was stored between uses in unlined ponds, which allowed it to percolate into the groundwater. This severely contaminated the groundwater, affecting soil and contaminating water wells near the compressor station, with a plume approximately 2 miles (3.2 km) long and nearly 1 mile (1.6 km) wide.

== Radioactive contamination ==
=== Pacific Proving Grounds ===
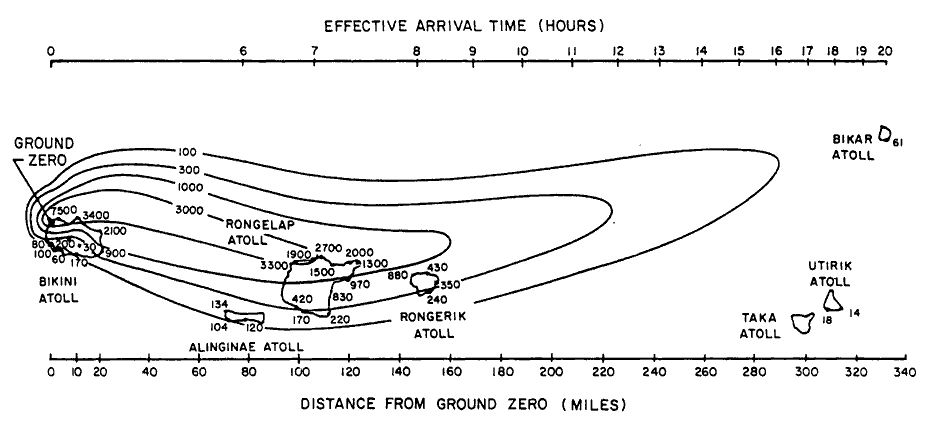
The Castle Bravo test of 1954 spread nuclear fallout across the Marshall Islands, parts of which were still inhabited.

The Pacific Proving Grounds were a number of sites in the Marshall Islands and elsewhere in the Pacific Ocean, used by the United States to conduct nuclear testing at various times between 1946 and 1962. In July 1947, after the first atomic weapons testing at Bikini Atoll, the United States entered into an agreement with the United Nations to govern the Trust Territory of the Pacific Islands as a strategic trusteeship territory. The Trust Territory is composed of 2,000 islands spread over 3,000,000 square miles (7,800,000 km^{2}) of the North Pacific Ocean. On July 23, 1947, the United States Atomic Energy Commission announced the establishment of the Pacific Proving Grounds.

105 atmospheric (i.e., not underground) nuclear tests were conducted there, many of which were of extremely high yield. While the Marshall Islands testing composed 14% of all US tests, it composed nearly 80% of the total yields of those detonated by the US, with an estimated total yield of around 210 megatons, with the largest being the 15 Mt Castle Bravo shot of 1954 which spread considerable nuclear fallout on many of the islands, including several which were inhabited, and some that had not been evacuated.

Many of the islands which were part of the Pacific Proving Grounds continue to be contaminated by nuclear fallout, and many of those who were living on the islands at the time of testing has suffered from an increased incidence of various health problems. Through the Radiation Exposure Compensation Act of 1990, at least US$759 million has been paid to Marshall Islanders as compensation for their exposure to U.S. nuclear testing. Following the Castle Bravo accident, $15.3 million was paid to Japan.

=== Nevada Test Site ===
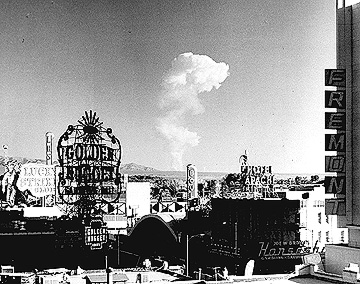
Mushroom cloud from the Nevada Test Site seen from downtown Las Vegas.

The Nevada Test Site (NTS), is a United States Department of Energy reservation located in southeastern Nye County, Nevada, about 65 miles (105 km) northwest of the city of Las Vegas. Formerly known as the Nevada Proving Grounds, the site was established on 11 January 1951 for the testing of nuclear devices, covering approximately 1,360 square miles (3,500 km^{2}) of desert and mountainous terrain. Nuclear testing at the Nevada Test Site began with a 1-kiloton-of-TNT (4.2 TJ) bomb dropped on Frenchman Flat on 27 January 1951. Many of the iconic images of the nuclear era come from the NTS.

During the 1950s, the mushroom clouds from atmospheric tests could be seen for almost 100 mi (160 km). The city of Las Vegas experienced noticeable seismic effects, and the distant mushroom clouds, which could be seen from the downtown hotels, became tourist attractions. St. George, Utah, received the brunt of the fallout of above-ground nuclear testing in the Yucca Flats/Nevada Test Site. Winds routinely carried the fallout of these tests directly through St. George and southern Utah. Marked increases in cancers, such as leukemia, lymphoma, thyroid cancer, breast cancer, melanoma, bone cancer, brain tumors, and gastrointestinal tract cancers, were reported from the mid-1950s through 1980.

From 1986 through 1994, two years after the United States put a hold on full-scale nuclear weapons testing, 536 anti-nuclear protests were held at the Nevada Test Site involving 37,488 participants and 15,740 arrests, according to government records. Those arrested included the astronomer Carl Sagan and the actors Kris Kristofferson, Martin Sheen, and Robert Blake.

The Nevada Test Site contains 28 areas, 1,100 buildings, 400 miles (640 km) of paved roads, 300 miles (480 km) of unpaved roads, ten heliports, and two airstrips. The most recent test was a sub-critical test of the properties of plutonium, conducted underground on December 7, 2012.

=== Semipalatinsk Test Site ===
The Semipalatinsk Test Site, also known as "The Polygon", was the primary testing venue for the Soviet Union's nuclear weapons. It is located on the steppe in northeast Kazakhstan (then the Kazakh SSR), south of the valley of the Irtysh River. The scientific buildings for the test site were located around 150 km west of the town of Semipalatinsk (later renamed Semey), near the border of East Kazakhstan Province and Pavlodar Province with most of the nuclear tests taking place at various sites further to the west and south, some as far as into Karagandy Province.

The Soviet Union conducted 456 nuclear tests at Semipalatinsk from 1949 until 1989 with little regard for their effect on the local people or environment. The full impact of radiation exposure was hidden for many years by Soviet authorities and has only come to light since the test site closed in 1991.

From 1996 to 2012, a secret joint operation of Kazakh, Russian, and American nuclear scientists and engineers secured the waste plutonium in the tunnels of the mountains.

== See also ==
- Health effects of pollution
- Superfund
- Japanese nuclear disaster, Fukushima
- Goiânia accident
- Chernobyl disaster and Chernobyl disaster effects
- List of most-polluted cities by particulate matter concentration
- Three Mile Island accident and Three Mile Island accident health effects
- Cuban Missile Crisis
- SL-1 nuclear meltdown
