= Andrist =

Family name

== Family name ==
Andrist is a Swiss family name with proof of family vital records at least back to the 16th century. Places of origins (rights of citizenship) are known from Simmental, Canton of Bern. Andrist is a folksy version of "Andreas" (Andrew in English). There is also a branch of the family name that may originate from the Lombardy region named Andrista, Cevo, Italy.

- Andy Andrist (born 1965), American stand-up comedian
- John M. Andrist (1931–2018), American politician
- Stephan Andrist (born 1987), Swiss footballer

== Mountains ==
There are two mountains called Andrist in Switzerland: Wild Andrist (means "wild Andrist") has an altitude of 2849 m asl; Zahm Andrist (refers to "tame Andrist") has an altitude of 2,648 m (8,688 ft) asl.
