= Shelia Hoar Zahm =

American epidemiologist

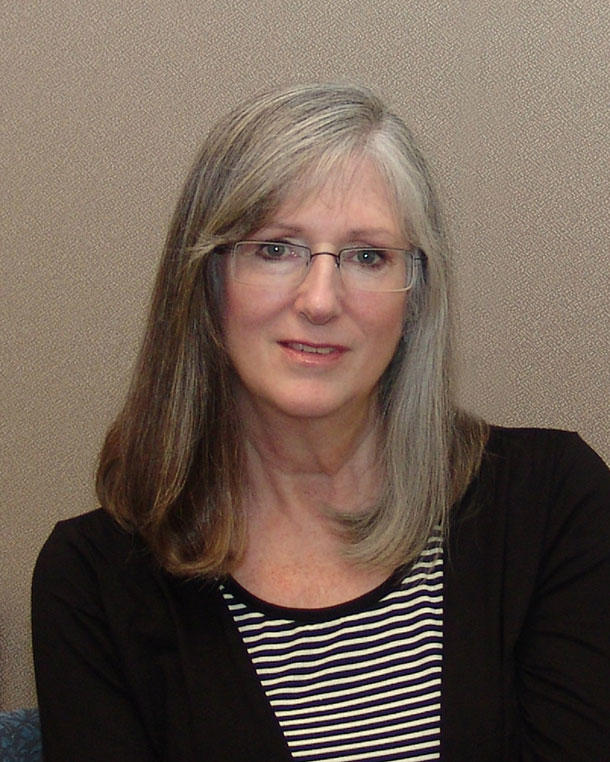
- Education: Harvard T.H. Chan School of Public Health
- Scientific career
- Fields: Cancer epidemiology
- Workplaces: National Cancer Institute

Shelia Hoar Zahm is an American cancer epidemiologist specialized in pesticides and cancer, the etiology of non-Hodgkin lymphoma, and occupational cancer among women. She was deputy director of the National Cancer Institute's division of cancer epidemiology and genetics from 1998 to 2011.

== Life ==
Zahm completed a S.M. (1977) and Sc.D. (1980) in epidemiology from the Harvard T.H. Chan School of Public Health. In 1980, she joined the National Cancer Institute (NCI) as a Staff Fellow in 1980. During the mid-1980s into the 1990s, her supervisor, Joseph F. Fraumeni Jr. allowed Zahm, and her colleagues Debra T. Silverman and Patricia Hartge to all work part-time so they could raise families. She was tenured in 1987 in the Occupational Studies Section, became Deputy Chief of the Occupational and Environmental Epidemiology Branch in 1996, and served as Deputy Director of the Division of Cancer Epidemiology and Genetics (DCEG) from 1998 to 2011. Zahm has received the American Occupational Medical Association's Merit in Authorship Award for a paper on job-exposure matrices, the Harvard School of Public Health Alumni Award of Merit, the U.S. DHHS Secretary's Award for Distinguished Service, the NIH Merit Award and the PHS Special Recognition Award for her work on the relationship between pesticides and the risk of non-Hodgkin lymphoma, the NIH Director's Award for her program of research on cancer among migrant and seasonal farm workers, the NIH Director’s Award for developing NIH biospecimen storage and tracking guidelines, the NIH Merit Award for implementation of the NIH Reform Act of 2006, two NIH Quality of Work Life Awards, the DCEG Mentoring Award, and the DCEG Exemplary Service Award. Zahm was elected to the American Epidemiological Society in 1995 and is an adjunct faculty member at George Washington University.

== Research interests ==
Her research interests include pesticides and cancer, the etiology of non-Hodgkin lymphoma, and occupational cancer among women.[2] Zahm retired in 2012.[4]
