= James Tonascia =

American biostatistician

James Tonascia is an American biostatistician. He is the Curtis L. Meinert Professor of Clinical Trials at Johns Hopkins Bloomberg School of Public Health. He joined the faculty in 1970 and was promoted to full professor in 1981.
