= Zahm Andrist =

Mountain in Switzerland

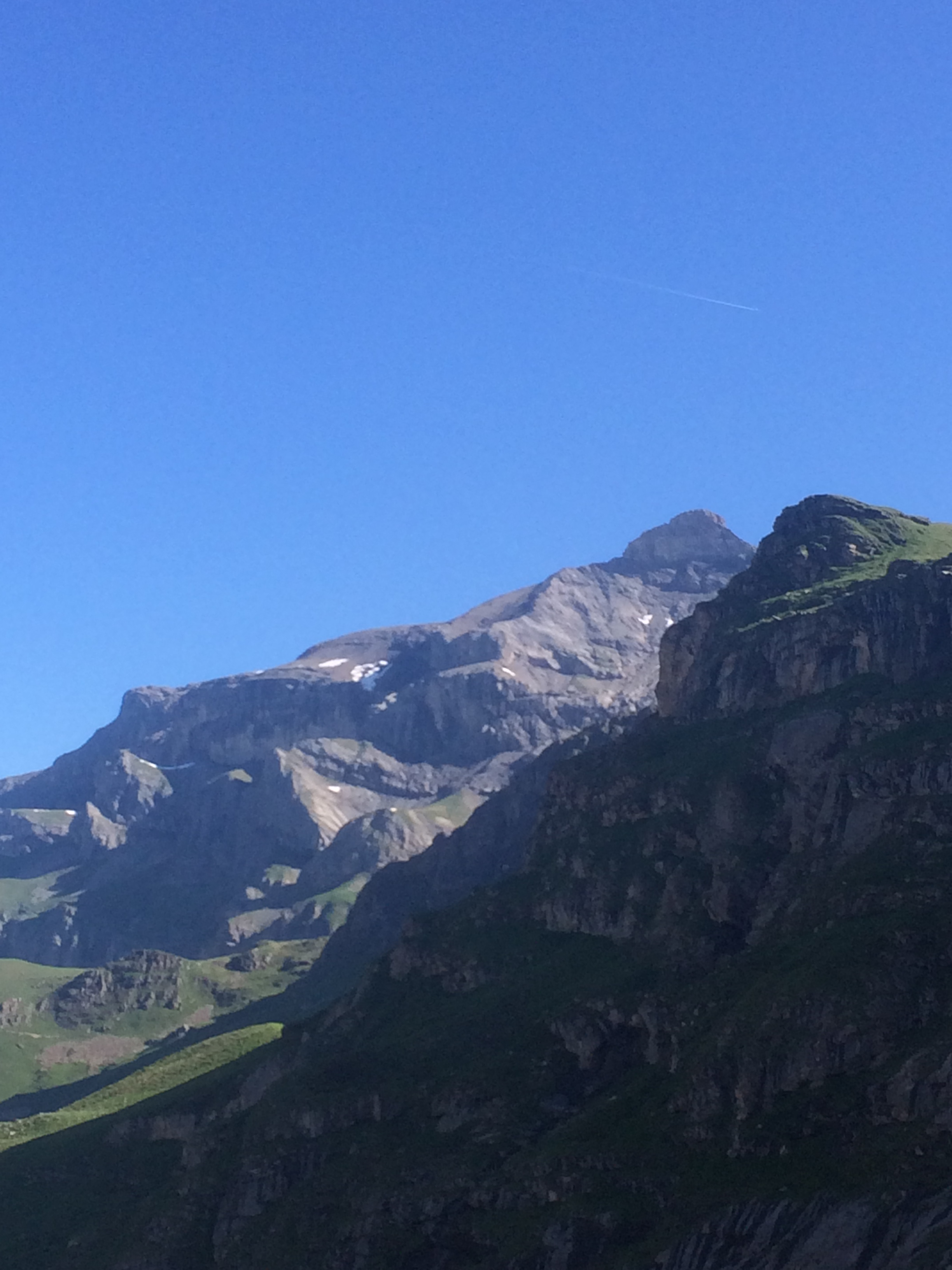
- Zahm Andrist on left.

Highest point
- Elevation: 2,681 m (8,796 ft)
- Prominence: 73 m (240 ft)
- Coordinates: 46°33′12.3″N 7°47′16.1″E

Geography
- Location within Switzerland
- Location: Bern, Switzerland
- Parent range: Bernese Alps

The Zahm Andrist is a mountain of the Bernese Alps, located south of Kiental in the Bernese Oberland. It lies west of the Hundshorn.

== See also ==
- Andrist
