= Patricia Hartge =

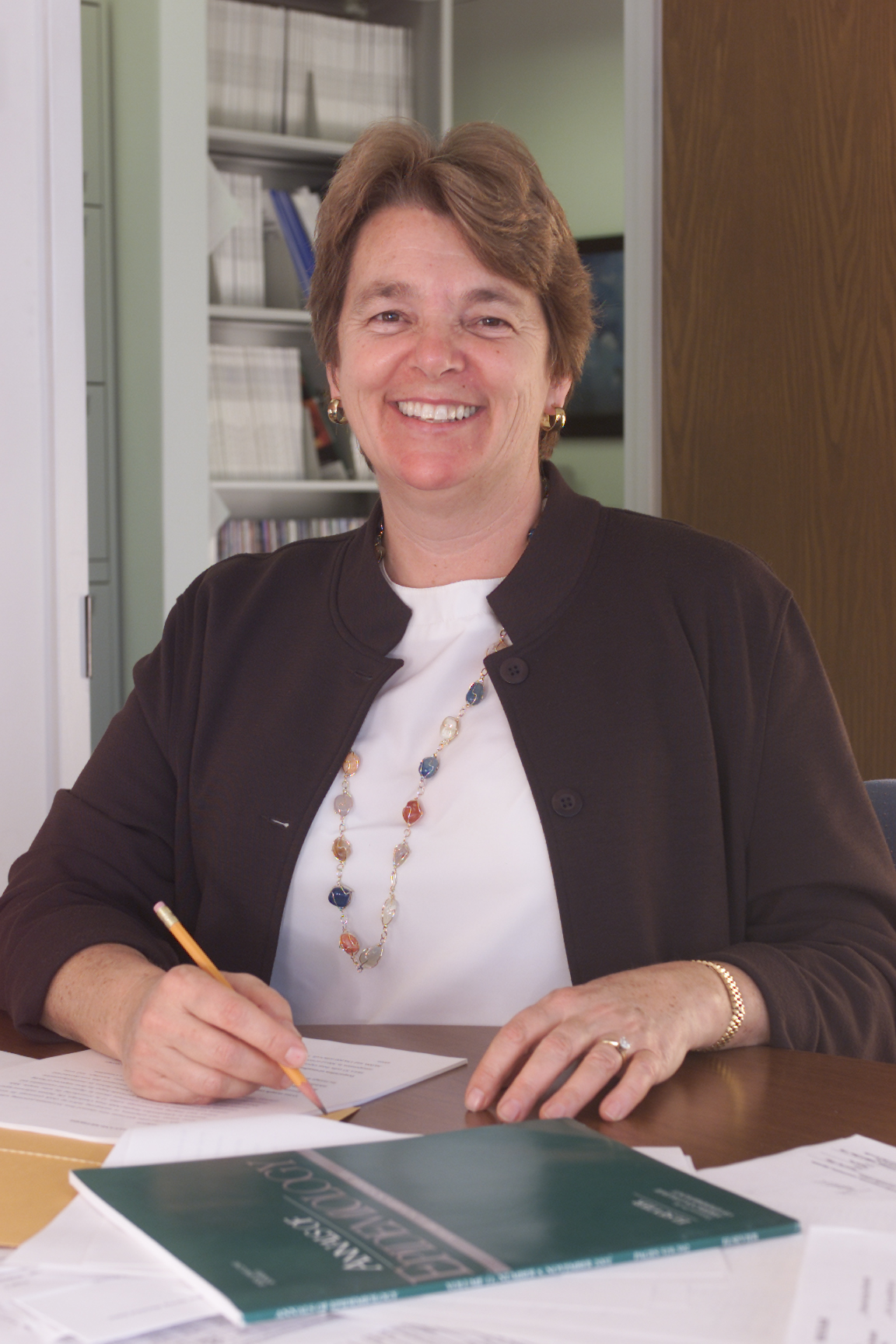
- Hartge in 2001
- Education: Radcliffe College; Yale University; Harvard T.H. Chan School of Public Health
- Scientific career
- Fields: Cancer epidemiology
- Workplaces: National Cancer Institute

Patricia A. Hartge is an American cancer epidemiologist who conducted genome-wide association studies on ovarian cancer, non-Hodgkin lymphoma, melanoma, and other malignancies. From 1996 to 2013, Hartge was deputy director of the epidemiology and biostatistics program in the division of cancer epidemiology and genetics at the National Cancer Institute.

== Life ==
Hartge completed a bachelor's degree at Radcliffe College and a M.A. in economics at Yale University. She was a research associate for two years at the Boston Children's Hospital. She was hired by Joseph F. Fraumeni Jr. and Robert Hoover to join the National Cancer Institute (NCI). She completed a Sc.M. (1976) and Sc.D. (1983) at the Harvard T.H. Chan School of Public Health. Her dissertation was titled A case-control study of bladder cancer. During the mid-1980s into the 1990s, her supervisor, Fraumeni Jr., allowed Hartge, and her colleagues Debra T. Silverman and Shelia Hoar Zahm to all work part-time so they could raise families.

Hartge made methodological contributions to epidemiology, from the first application of random digit dialing in the 1970s to conducting genome-wide association studies (GWAS) today. During her tenure at National Institutes of Health (NIH), she carried out research on ovarian cancer, non-Hodgkin lymphoma, melanoma and other malignancies. In 1996, she became deputy director of the NCI epidemiology and biostatistics program in the division of cancer epidemiology and genetics (DCEG) . She was an architect of international, interdisciplinary, multi-institutional consortia in cancer epidemiology, including InterLymph and the NCI Cohort Consortium. Hartge retired in 2013 after 36 years with NCI.
