= Wilma Subra =

American environmental scientist

- Born: 1943; Morgan City, Louisiana
- Education: Bachelor's (1965) and master's (1966), chemistry and microbiology, University of Southwestern Louisiana
- Occupation: Chemist
- Organization: Subra Company
- Known for: Environmental health

Wilma Subra (born 1943) is an American environmental and chemist scientist. Subra has dedicated her life to helping citizens concerned about the effects of the environment on their health. She is President of the Subra Company, an environmental consulting firm.

Subra was born in Morgan City, Louisiana, and was raised there and in a census-designated place called Bayou Vista. Her father was a chemist, and her grandfather an oyster fisherman. She obtained a bachelor's degree in microbiology and chemistry in 1965 from the University of Southwestern Louisiana in Lafayette, and her master's a year later.

From 1967 until 1981 Subra worked for the Gulf South Research Institute. She founded the Subra Company in May 1981 to help people facing problems because of environmental health issues.

Subra served for seven years as vice-chair of the Environmental Protection Agency's (EPA) National Advisory Council for Environmental Policy and Technology, for six years on the EPA's National Environmental Justice Advisory Council, and for five years on the National Advisory Committee of the US Representative to the Commission for Environmental Cooperation. She appeared in the 2010 documentary Gasland.

== Awards ==
- 1999 MacArthur Fellows Program
- 2004 Volvo for Life Award finalist
- 2011 Global Exchange Human Rights Awards Honoree
