= Journal of Occupational and Environmental Medicine =

- Discipline: Occupational and environmental medicine
- Language: English

Publication details
- Former name(s): Journal of Occupational Medicine
- History: 1959-present
- Publisher: Lippincott Williams & Wilkins on behalf of the American College of Occupational and Environmental Medicine (United States)
- Frequency: Monthly
- Impact factor: 1.355 (2017)

Standard abbreviations
- ISO 4: J. Occup. Environ. Med.

Indexing
- CODEN: JOEMFM
- ISSN: 0096-1736
- LCCN: 95660651
- OCLC no.: 454452660
- Journal of Occupational and Environmental Medicine
- ISSN: 1076-2752 (print); 1536-5948 (web)

Links
- Journal homepage; Online access; Online archive

The Journal of Occupational and Environmental Medicine is a monthly peer-reviewed medical journal published by Lippincott Williams & Wilkins on behalf of the American College of Occupational and Environmental Medicine (ACOEM).

Established in 1959 as the Journal of Occupational Medicine and obtaining its current name in 1995, it covers all aspects of occupational medicine and occupational health psychology.

As ACOEM's official publication, the journal publishes its guidance and position statements several times per year.
