= Compressor station =

Facility in gas transportation systems

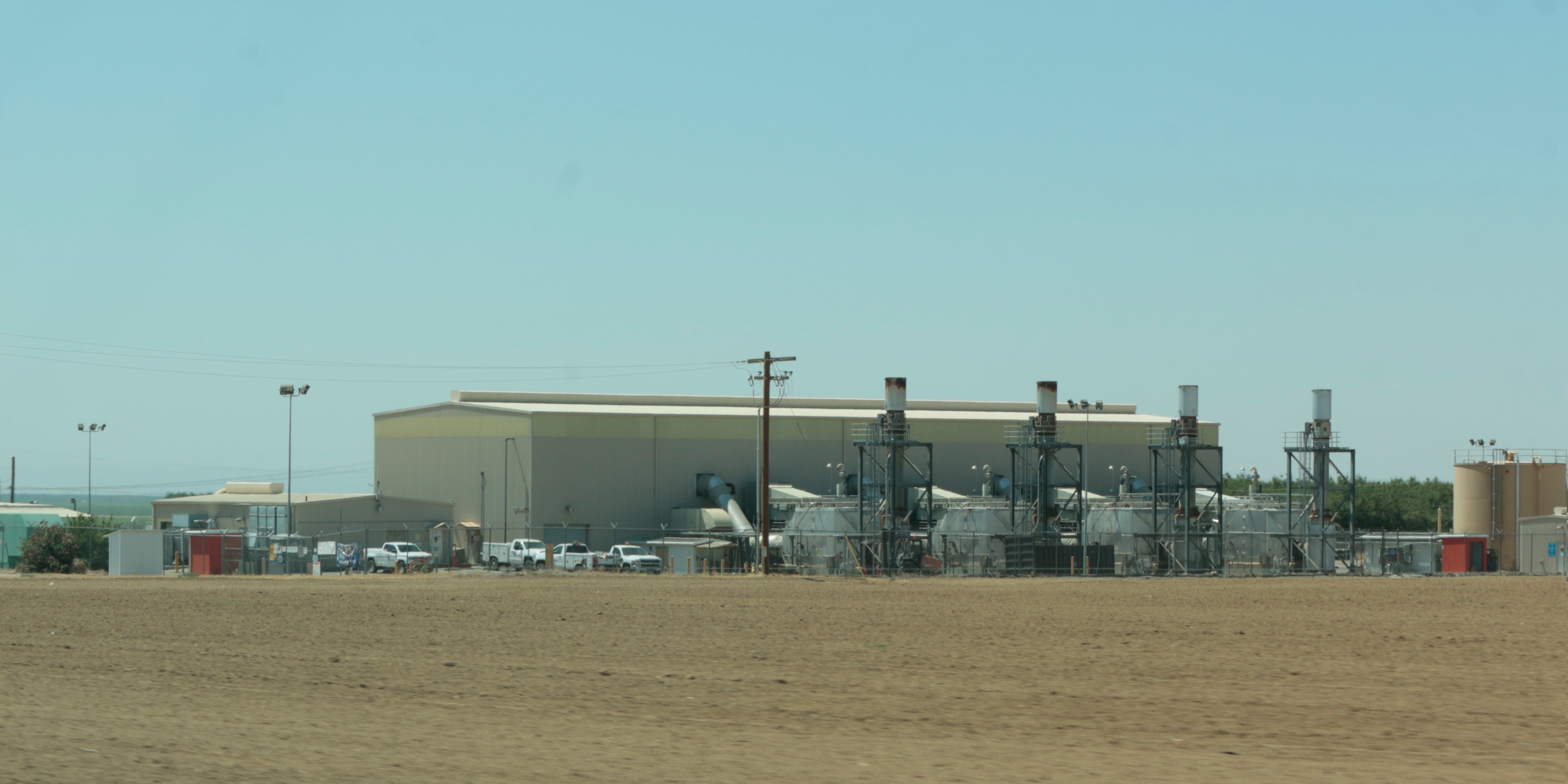
Wheeler Ridge Compressor Station, in Kern County, California

A compressor station is a facility which helps the movement of gas from one location to another in a pipeline system. Gases typically transported over long distances in this way include natural gas, methane, ethylene, hydrogen, ammonia and carbon dioxide. While being transported through a pipeline the gas pressure gradually decreases due to frictional effects and needs to be periodically repressurized at intervals of about 40 to 100 miles (64 to 161 km). Siting of compressor stations is dependent on terrain, accessibility and whether there are other tie-ins such as gas wells in the vicinity. Frequent elevation changes and a greater number of gas wells will require more compressor stations.

The compressor station, also called a pumping station, is the "engine" that powers a long-distance gas pipelines. As the name suggests, the station compresses the gas (increasing its pressure) thereby providing additional energy to move it through the pipeline. The compressor is driven by an electric motor or an engine fueled by some of the natural gas bled from the pipeline or liquid fuel such as diesel.

Companies install compressor stations along a pipeline route. The size of the station and the number of compressors (pumps) varies, based on the diameter of the pipe and the volume of gas to be moved. Nevertheless, the basic components of a station are similar.

Natural gas may move through a pipeline system typically at speeds of up to 25 mph (11.2 m/s), depending on pressures and pipeline diameters. For a pipeline system operating at a nominal pressure of 1000 psi (such as the UK National Transmission System) compressor stations compress the gas from about 48 bar (700 psi) to 65 bar (950 psi). Compressor stations generally operate at a pressure ratio of 1:1.4. During compression the gas may increase in temperature from 5 °C (41°F) to 45 °C (113°F). Limiting the pressure ratio ensures that the temperature rise across the compressors is not high enough to require after-coolers to prevent damage to the pipeline protective coatings.

== Liquid Separators ==
As the pipeline enters the compressor station the gas passes through scrubbers, strainers or filter separators. These are vessels designed to remove any free liquids or solid particles from the gas before it enters the compressors. Though the pipeline is carrying “dry gas,” some water and hydrocarbon liquids may condense out of the gas stream as the gas cools and moves through the pipeline.

Any liquids that may be produced are collected and stored for sale or disposal. A piping system directs the gas from the separators to the gas compressor for compression.

== Prime Movers ==
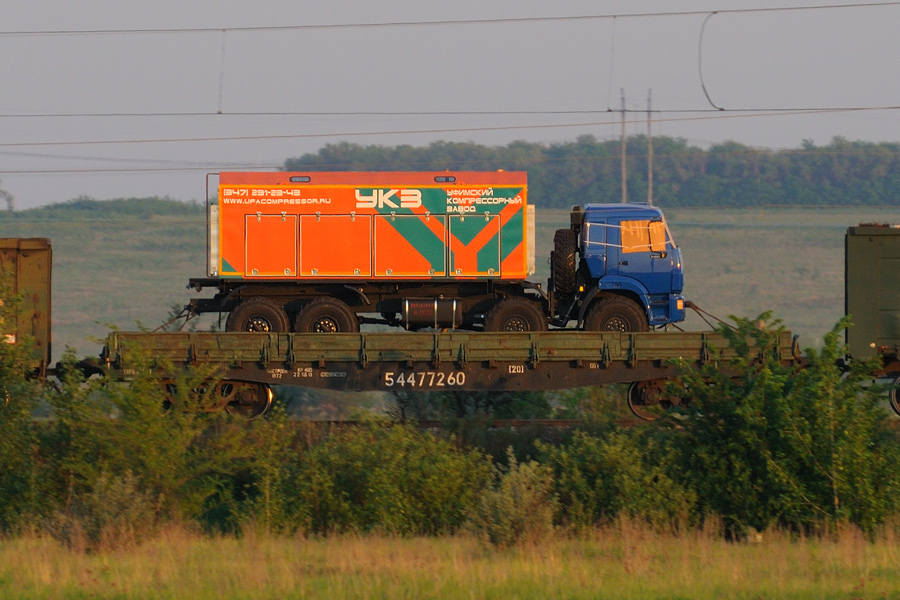
Mobile compressor station produced by the Ufa Compressor Factory on a KamAZ-63501 chassis

There are three commonly used types of engines that drive the compressors and are known as "prime movers":

- Gas turbine / Centrifugal Compressor uses a natural gas-fired turbine to turn a centrifugal compressor. The centrifugal compressor is similar to a large fan inside a case, which pumps the gas as the fan turns. A small portion of natural gas from the pipeline is burned to power the turbine.
- Electric Motor/Centrifugal Compressor uses a centrifugal compressor driven by a high voltage electric motor. An electrified compressor may still require an air permit, as regulations vary by location an applicability analysis should be conducted whenever a compressor station will be constructed. A reliable source of electric power must be available and near the station.
- Reciprocating Engine/Reciprocating Compressor uses a large piston engine resembling an automobile engine, but much larger. Commonly known as “recips,” these engines are fueled by natural gas from the pipeline. Reciprocating pistons, located in cylinder cases, compress the gas. The compressor pistons and the power pistons are connected to a common crankshaft. The advantage of reciprocating compressors is that the volume of gas flowing through the pipeline can be adjusted incrementally to meet changes in customer demand.

== Pigging facilities ==
As the pipeline enters the compressor station a pig receiver may be installed to receive pigs sent down the pipeline from an upstream facility. An intelligent pig, travelling at the prevailing gas velocity, measures the wall thickness of the pipeline and identifies areas of corrosion or defects. As the pipeline leaves the compressor station a pig launcher may be installed to send pigs down the pipeline to the next facility.

== See also ==
- Gas compressor
- Centrifugal fan
- Gas compression heat pump
- Pigging
