= American College of Occupational and Environmental Medicine =

- Formation: 1916
- Type: Professional association
- Legal status: 501(c)(3)
- Headquarters: Schaumburg, Illinois, U.S.
- Members: 3000
- President: Jill Rosenthal, MD, MPH, MA, MSQM, FACOEM
- CEO: Andrew Prazuch, CAE
- Website: www.acoem.org

American College of Occupational and Environmental Medicine (ACOEM) is a United States-based professional society for health care professionals in the field of occupational safety and health. ACOEM is a physician-led organization that champions the health of workers, safety of workplaces, and quality of environments.

== History ==
The American Occupational Medical Association was created in 1916. The American Academy of Occupational Medicine was created in 1946. In 1988, both organizations were merged to form the present day American College of Occupational and Environmental Medicine.

== OEM Mission ==
Occupational and Environmental Medicine (OEM) is the medicine specialty devoted to prevention and management of occupational and environmental injury, illness and disability, and promotion of health and productivity of workers, their families, and communities.

ACOEM, an international society of more than 3,000 occupational physicians and associated professionals, provides leadership to promote optimal health and safety of workers, workplaces, and environments. ACOEM's membership includes physicians, Advanced Practice Providers (such as Nurse Practitioners and Physician Associates), industrial hygienists, and other allied health professionals.

== Publications and Educational Offerings ==
ACOEM publishes the Journal of Occupational and Environmental Medicine (JOEM), a scientific, peer-reviewed monthly publication in the specialty of occupational and environmental medicine offering clinically oriented research articles and technical reports.

ACOEM has several electronic newsletters, including ACOEM in Motion, a monthly, member-focused newsletter, and Science in the News, which focuses on the latest advancements in occupational and environmental medicine.

In 2026, ACOEM introduced the Public Safety Medicine Course, an on-demand, interactive continuing medical education program designed to support physicians who conduct fitness-for-duty evaluations for public safety personnel, including firefighters, law enforcement officers, and other first responders.

ACOEM authors position papers providing guidance for a variety of topics such as spirometry, noise-induced hearing loss, obesity, workplace drug screening, confidentiality of medical information, depression screening, and reproductive hazards.

== Notable Members ==
Alice Hamilton (1869–1970) – Physician and pioneer of occupational health and industrial toxicology in the United States. First woman appointed to the faculty of Harvard University (1919). Her research on lead poisoning, industrial chemicals, and workplace hazards led to sweeping health and safety reforms and helped lay the groundwork for the Occupational Safety and Health Act of 1970. Recipient of the Albert Lasker Public Service Award (1947).

Clarence Olds Sappington (1889–1949) – Physician and early leader in industrial medicine. First American to receive the degree of Doctor of Public Health in Industrial Hygiene from the Harvard School of Public Health (1924). First recipient of the William S. Knudsen Award (1939) for outstanding contributions to industrial medicine. Served as director of the Division of Industrial Health at the National Safety Council and as editor of Industrial Medicine and Surgery. ACOEM's annual Sappington Lecture, delivered at AOHC, is given in his honor.

Erica Schwartz – Confirmed in 2026 as the 22nd director of the Centers for Disease Control and Prevention. Previously served as deputy surgeon general of the United States and held the rank of rear admiral in the U.S. Public Health Service Commissioned Corps.

== American Occupational Health Conference (AOHC) ==
The American Occupational Health Conference (AOHC) is the professional meeting for physicians and other health professionals who have an interest in the fields of occupational and environmental medicine (OEM). It is also the annual membership meeting for ACOEM's members. More than 1,000 people from around the globe convene to learn from each other, share knowledge, and connect through shared experience at AOHC, one of the largest gatherings of occupational and environmental health professionals in the world.

=== Past AOHC conferences ===
- 2020: Virtual – Impacted by the COVID-19 pandemic, originally planned for Washington, D.C.
- 2021: Virtual – Impacted by the COVID-19 pandemic
- 2022: Salt Lake City, UT
- 2023: Philadelphia, PA
- 2024: Orlando, Florida
- 2025: Austin, Texas
- 2026: Chicago, IL
