= Mary Amdur =

American toxicologist (1921–1998)

- Born: February 18, 1921; Pittsburgh, Pennsylvania, US
- Died: February 16, 1998 (aged 76)
- Education: Chemistry (BSc.) at University of Pittsburgh; Biochemistry (Ph.D.) at Cornell University
- Known for: Toxicology research into 1948 Donora smog
- Spouse: Benjamin Amdur
- Children: 1-David Amdur
- Scientific career
- Fields: Toxicology
- Institutions: Harvard University; MIT; New York University
- Thesis: Role of Manganese and Choline in Bone Formation in the Rat

Mary Ochsenhirt Amdur (February 18, 1921 – February 16, 1998) was an American toxicologist and public health researcher who worked primarily on pollution. She was charged with studying the effects of the 1948 Donora smog, specifically looking into the effects of inhaling sulfuric acid by experimenting on guinea pigs. Her findings on the respiratory effects related to sulfuric acid led to her being threatened, her funding being pulled, and her losing her job at the Harvard School of Public Health in 1953. Undeterred, she carried on her research in a different role at Harvard, and subsequently at MIT and New York University. Despite the early controversy related to her work, it was used in the creation of standards in air pollution, and towards the end of her life she received numerous awards and accolades.

== Early life ==
Mary Amdur was born in 1921 in Pittsburgh, Pennsylvania. She received a bachelor's degree in chemistry in 1943 from the University of Pittsburgh, moving to Cornell University to study biochemistry at the postgraduate level. She received her PhD in biochemistry in 1946, writing her thesis on the "Role of Manganese and Choline in Bone Formation in the Rat". She met her husband, Benjamin Amdur, while they were both undergraduates at the University of Pittsburgh. They were married in October 1944 in Rochester, New York. After achieving her PhD, she worked at the Massachusetts Eye and Ear Infirmary before joining Philip Drinker's team at Harvard School of Public Health in 1949. Mary and Benjamin Amdur had one son, David, who was born in 1961.

== Research ==
The American Smelting and Refining Company (ASARCO) funded Drinker to investigate the 1948 Donora smog, as the company had an interest in showing that its primary pollutants (sulfuric acid and sulfur dioxide) had not significantly contributed to the damage it caused. In the middle of 1953, Amdur and her husband, Benjamin, developed a method of spraying a combination mist of sulfuric acid and sulfur dioxide into humid chambers containing guinea pigs to investigate the damage that it would cause to their lungs. The Amdurs bought their own guinea pigs for the mini project, and spent the 4th of July weekend doing the investigation.

"The trouble with this branch of medical science is that it is always tied up more or less with somebody's pocketbook—Maybe the companies, maybe the insurance people, maybe the doctor in charge ... Looked at that way, realize that Philip Drinker has wife and children who are 'hostages ... to fortune, an impediment to all great enterprises, whether good or evil'"

— Personal note from Alice Hamilton to Mary Amdur after she was fired.

Amdur presented the results of the experiment, that inhaling the combination mist led to dramatic effects on breathing, loss of weight and lung disease, to the American Association for the Advancement of Science at their annual meeting in December 1953. She then wrote a damning paper on the effects of lower levels of sulfuric acid on human volunteers, levels similar to those of the 1948 smog. The paper, and her attempt to present the associated findings to the American Industrial Hygiene Association, caused her many difficulties. Amdur was accosted and threatened by two thugs in an elevator at the association's 1954 annual meeting. She presented the findings regardless. As Drinker received funding from ASARCO, the company's management assumed that they would hold sway over what was published. When Amdur returned from the meeting, Drinker demanded that Amdur remove her name from the paper and to withdraw it from The Lancet, despite the fact it had already been accepted. Amdur refused Drinker's demands, so her position on his staff was removed and she was left to find new work. The paper was never published.

She quickly found a new untenured research associate role under James Whittenberger, chair of physiology at Harvard School of Public Health, working with Dr. Jere Mead. She continued the research on air pollution, which she began under Drinker, until she left the school in 1977. Partly because of the difficulty in obtaining tenure at Harvard, both for herself and for her colleague Sheldon Murphy, and partly because she needed to work with engineers to produce suitable combustion products, she moved her research to the nearby Massachusetts Institute of Technology (MIT) and accepted a position as lecturer, securing funding for the next 12 years. When she moved, her new focus was the interaction of metals and gases in the inhalation of sulfuric acid. Dissatisfied with the attention the research received at MIT, she moved to the Institute of Environmental Medicine at New York University in 1989 as a senior research scientist, where she remained until her retirement in 1996.

== Awards ==
In 1953, Amdur was inducted as a member of Delta Omega Honorary Society in Public Health. In 1974, she received the Donald E. Cummings Memorial Award from the American Industrial Hygiene Association in recognition of her lifetime contributions and application of her knowledge in the field. The American Academy of Industrial Hygiene Council awarded her the Henry F. Smyth Jr. Award in 1984 for identifying and fulfilling research needs within the industrial hygiene profession. In 1986, she received the Inhalation Specialty Section's Career Achievement Award from the Society of Toxicology. She received the Herbert E. Stockinger Award from the American Conference of Governmental Industrial Hygienists in 1989. In 1988 she gained, the Mid-Atlantic Section, Society of Toxicology Ambassador Award. Then in 1997, she was awarded the Merit Award from the same society, in celebration of her achievements throughout her life and her contributions to Toxicology.

== Death and legacy ==
"At every step along the way, people tried to pull the rug out from under her. In fact, she got it right years before the rest of us. The world only caught up with her several decades later, by which time so many people had confirmed what she found that it could no longer be discounted."

— John Spengler

Amdur died on February 16, 1998, of a heart attack while returning from a holiday in Hawaii. At least three societies wrote obituaries and a toxicology book was dedicated to her memory. A Society of Toxicology Award was set up in her name by students and colleagues. The award, the Mary Amdur Student Award is presented annually at the meeting of the Inhalation and Respiratory Specialty Section. She is considered the "mother of smog research" and her work had "a major role in the development of air pollution standards."
