= Eula Bingham =

American scientist (1929–2020)

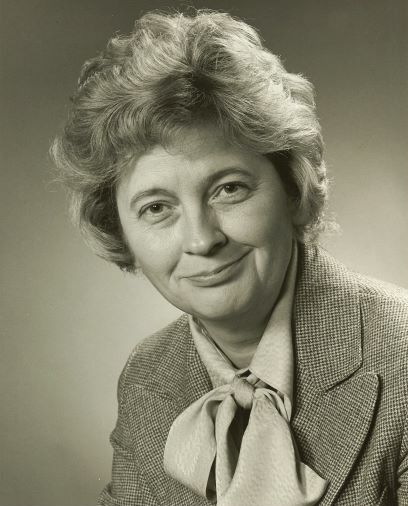

Assistant Secretary of Labor for Occupational Safety and Health Administration
- In office April 1977 – January 1981
- President: Jimmy Carter
- Preceded by: Bert Concklin (acting)
- Succeeded by: David Zeigler

Personal details
- Born: July 9, 1929; Covington, Kentucky, U.S.
- Died: June 13, 2020 (aged 90); Cincinnati, Ohio, U.S.
- Education: Eastern Kentucky University B.S. Chemistry and Biology; University of Cincinnati M.S., Ph.D.

Eula Bingham (July 9, 1929 – June 13, 2020) was an American scientist, best known as an Assistant Secretary of Labor for Occupational Safety and Health (OSHA) during the Presidency of Jimmy Carter. During her tenure as the head of OSHA, she eliminated more than 1,000 pedantic regulations and shifted the agency's focus to health and safety risks, establishing strict standards for workers' rights to know about their exposure to hazardous substances.

== Early life ==
Eula Bingham, an only child, was born in Covington, Kentucky, in 1929. Her mother, Frieda (Sperl) Bingham, worked as a nurse and telephone operator. Her father, Arthur Bingham, was a railroad worker who lost his job during the Depression. Following the loss of his job the family moved to a farm in nearby Burlington, Kentucky. After graduating from high school, Bingham was offered a job at Procter & Gamble Co., but her father insisted she should attend college instead and borrowed money to help pay for it.

== Education ==
Bingham earned a B.S. in 1951 in Chemistry and Biology from Eastern Kentucky University; a M.S. in 1954 in Physiology from the University of Cincinnati; and a Ph.D. in 1958 in Zoology, also from the University of Cincinnati.

== Career ==
Bingham began her career at the University of Cincinnati College of Medicine in 1961 as a researcher who did pioneering work on chemical carcinogens. She contributed more than one hundred peer-reviewed articles on occupational and environmental respiratory hazards; chemical carcinogenesis and related topics; and occupational and environmental health policy. As her research gained attention, she began working as a consultant and expert witness in lawsuits involving worker safety.

As her reputation in occupational health and safety grew, she began serving on government commissions. She served as a scientific and policy advisor for the National Institute for Occupational Safety and Health from 1972 to 1976, in the Department of Labor as an advisor on coke oven emissions and carcinogens (1973–75), in the National Academy of Sciences' Lead in Paint Commission (1974–75), in the Food and Drug Administration, and in the Environmental Protection Agency (1976–77).

President Jimmy Carter appointed her Director of OSHA, and she served through his administration, between 1977 and 1981. During her administration of OSHA notable regulatory activity included revised occupational lead exposure standard and promulgation of regulations on workers' "right to know" about workplace hazards. Her time as Director of OSHA was characterized by the removal of various regulations on miscellaneous items such as toilet seats and umbrellas. Instead, she strengthened safeguards on lead, benzene, cotton dust, and other chemical agents. She later served as Vice President and University Dean for Graduate Studies and Research at the University of Cincinnati (1982–1990), and as a distinguished professor of environmental health at the University of Cincinnati. After her time in the Carter administration, she continued working with state legislators, labor unions and consumer groups to implement safety regulations at the state and local levels, including consultation on the cleanup following the Exxon Valdez oil spill.

In recognition of her numerous accomplishments, she received honors and awards including:

- 2000 - David Platt Rall Award for Advocacy in Public Health, American Public Health Association
- 2000 - Ramazzini Award for Science and Policy, Collegium Ramazzini, Carpi, Italy
- 1999 - Mary O. Amdur Award, New York University.
- 1998 - Henry Smythe Jr., Toxicologist Award, American Academy of Industrial Hygiene.
- 1995 - American Industrial Hygiene Association's Hamilton Award.
- 1994 - William Steiger Award, American Conference of Governmental Industrial Hygienists.
- 1989 - Member, Institute of Medicine, National Academy of Sciences.
- 1989 - Jerry F. Stara Award, United States Environmental Protection Agency, Cincinnati, OH.
- 1984 - First Recipient of the William Lloyd Award for Occupational Safety, U.S. Steel Workers Union, Pittsburgh, PA.
- 1984 - Alice Hamilton Award, American Public Health Association.
- 1981 - Phil Hart Award, Urban Environment Conference, Washington, DC.
- 1981 - Doctor of Law (Honorary), College of Mount St. Joseph, Cincinnati, OH.
- 1980 - Rockefeller Foundation Public Service Award, Washington, D.C.
- 1980 - Julia Jones Award, New York Lung Association, American Lung Association, New York, NY
- 1980 - Homer N. Calver Award, American Public Health Association, Detroit, MI.
- 1979 - Doctor of Sciences (Honorary), Eastern Kentucky University, Richmond, KY.

== Personal life ==
She died on June 13, 2020, at the age of 90.
