= AVR =

AVR may refer to:

== Railroad ==
- Allegheny Valley Railroad (1995), shortline railroad in Pennsylvania, U.S.
- Aroostook Valley Railroad, a defunct railroad in Maine, U.S.
- Assiniboine Valley Railway, a minimum gauge railway in Winnipeg, Canada
- Avon Valley Railway, a heritage railway in the United Kingdom

== Radio ==
- Aboriginal Voices Radio, an Aboriginal Canadian national radio network
- Annapolis Valley Radio, a country station located in Kentville, Nova Scotia

== Electronics ==
- AVR microcontrollers, a family of microcontrollers originally developed by Atmel, now part of Microchip Technology
- Audio/video receiver, a home theater electronic component
- Acronym for augmented reality and virtual reality interactive experiences
- Automatic voltage regulator

== Other uses ==
- Armed violence reduction
- Aortic valve replacement
- Automatic voter registration
- Avacyn Restored
- AVR reactor (Arbeitsgemeinschaft Versuchsreaktor), a German prototype pebble bed reactor
- Avirulence gene, "Avr"
- Auxiliary Vessel, Rescue or Aircraft Vessel, Rescue
- Lead augmented vector right (aVR), a voltage difference in electrocardiography
