= Permissible exposure limit =

Workplace environmental standard

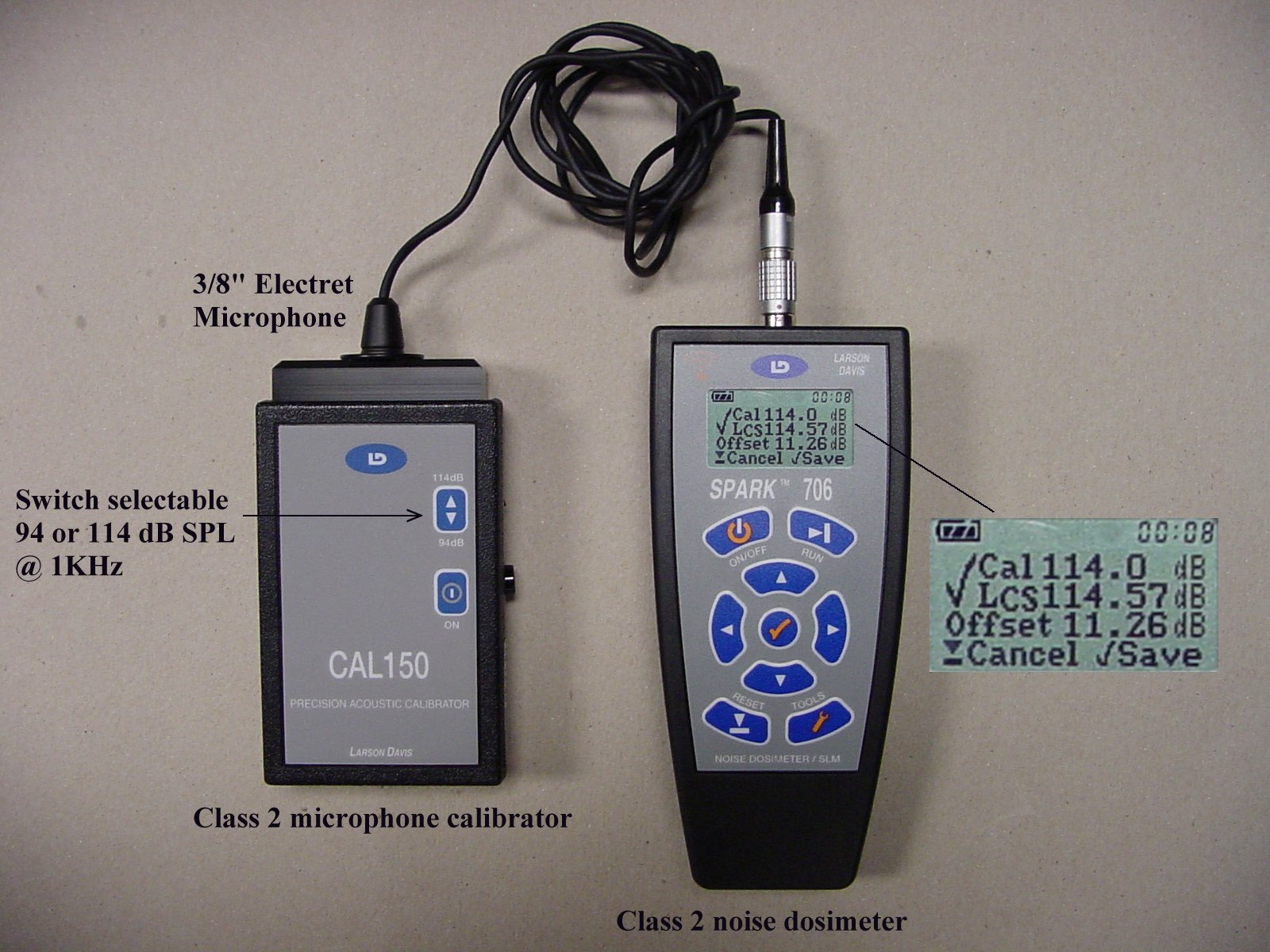
Noise dosimeter used to measure a worker's exposure to occupational noise

A permissible exposure limit (PEL) is a legal limit in the United States for a worker's exposure to a chemical substance or physical agent, such as noise. PELs are established and enforced by the Occupational Safety and Health Administration (OSHA). Most OSHA PELs were adopted shortly after passage of the Occupational Safety and Health Act of 1970.

For air contaminants, exposure limits are commonly expressed in parts per million (ppm) or milligrams per cubic meter (mg/m^{3}). Units for physical agents such as noise are specific to the hazard being measured. A PEL is usually expressed as an 8-hour-time-weighted average, although some standards also use short-term exposure limits or ceiling limits.

A PEL is usually given as a time-weighted average (TWA), although some are short-term exposure limits (STEL) or ceiling limits. A TWA is the average exposure over a specified period, usually a nominal eight hours. This means that for limited periods, a worker may be exposed to concentration excursions higher than the PEL as long as the TWA is not exceeded and any applicable excursion limit is not exceeded. An excursion limit typically means that "...worker exposure levels may exceed 3 times the PEL-TWA for no more than a total of 30 minutes during a workday, and under no circumstances should they exceed 5 times the PEL-TWA, provided that the PEL-TWA is not exceeded." Excursion limits are enforced in some states (for example Oregon) and on the federal level for certain contaminants such as asbestos.

A short-term exposure limit is one that addresses the average exposure over a 15-30 minute period of maximum exposure during a single work shift. A ceiling limit is one that may not be exceeded even for a moment, and is applied to irritants and other materials that have immediate effects.

== Regulatory agencies for occupational noise exposure ==
=== OSHA ===
The occupational noise standard established by OSHA states that the permissible exposure limit for noise is 90 decibels (dBA) on an 8-hour-time-weighted average. OSHA also uses an action level of 85 dBA, at which point employers must implement a hearing conservation program.

=== MSHA ===
Like OSHA, Mine Safety and Health Administration (MSHA) also uses the same 5 decibel exchange rate and 90 dBA for an 8-hour TWA for their PEL. Once a miner's noise exposure exceeds the PEL, feasible engineering AND administrative controls must be in place to try to limit the noise exposure of the employees. If a mine operator uses administrative controls, procedures for such controls must be posted on the bulletin board and a copy must be supplied to all affected employees.

=== NIOSH ===
The National Institute for Occupational Safety and Health (NIOSH) publishes recommended exposure limits (RELs), which are not legally enforceable. For occupational noise, NIOSH recommends an exposure limit of 85 dBA as an 8-hour-time-weighted average and uses a 3-decibel exchange rate.

== Chemical regulation for permissible exposure limits ==
Permissible Exposure Limits are regulatory limits for chemical hazards in a workplace set by OSHA. Organizations may implement stricter guidelines for chemical use and exposure, but OSHA guidelines must be followed at the minimum. Permissible Exposure Limits are time-weighted average, meaning that a worker may be exposed to higher concentrations of the chemical at different times of the work shift.

Many factors contribute in establishing Permissible Exposure Limits. Threshold Limit Values (TLVs), often determined by the American Conference of Governmental Industrial Hygienists (ACGIH), is a key component in determining the PEL. Other things that contribute to determining the PEL are toxicity and particle size.

PELs for chemicals are measured in mg/m^{3} (milligrams per cubic meter). mg/m^{3} is used to measure pollutant's mass in the air. PELs compliance is monitored through direct reading measurement tools, various sampling methods, and measuring biological markers in workers. Sampling for biological markers may include sampling urine and blood. Direct measurement tools, such as Q-Trak, and indirect measurement tools such as gas chromatography can be used for air sampling.

== Limitations and criticism ==
Many OSHA permissible exposure limits have been criticized as outdated because many were adopted shortly after the Occupational Safety and Health Act of 1970 and have not been fully updated.

A major limitation is that PELs are not based only on health effects. Regulatory agencies must also consider feasibility and cost, which can result in limits that are less protective than newer recommendations. Workers are often exposed to multiple hazards at the same time, while PELs are usually created for individual substances. This can make real-world exposure more complex than the limits suggest.

Despite these limitations, PELs remain an important part of workplace safety regulations in the United States and are used alongside updated guidance from OSHA and NIOSH.

== Noise Exposure ==
Occupational noise exposure is a major cause of hearing loss. OSHA states that exposure above 85 decibels (dBA) can damage hearing and requires employers to monitor noise levels and implement controls when necessary. Control methods include engineering controls, administrative controls, and personal protective equipment such as earplugs or earmuffs.

Currently, about 22 million Americans are subject to harmful workplace noise. There are many factors, besides in the workplace, to how noise exposure can affect individuals more or less. These factors can include, but are not limited to, ageing, heredity factors, recreational activities, and some illnesses.

While there are recommendations that exist for noise levels and noise control in communities, there is a lack of general agreement regarding acceptable exposure limits in non-occupational settings or the general environment. To limit noise exposure levels there are several approaches that can be used. One way to limit noise exposure is by wearing personal protective equipment (PPE) such as earplugs, or earmuffs. Another way to limit exposure should be reducing being in environments with heavy amounts of noise exposure. With this in mind it is important to keep individuals informed about prolonged noise exposure.

== See also ==
- Mine Safety and Health Administration
- National Institute for Occupational Safety and Health
- Recommended exposure limit
- Respirator assigned protection factors
- STEL
- Threshold limit value published by ACGIH
- Occupational exposure banding
