= Nanotoxicology (journal) =

- Discipline: Nanotechnology, toxicology
- Language: English
- Edited by: Håkan Wallin

Publication details
- History: 2007-present
- Publisher: Informa Healthcare
- Frequency: Quarterly
- Impact factor: 5.913 (2020)

Standard abbreviations
- ISO 4: Nanotoxicology

Indexing
- CODEN: NANOGK
- ISSN: 1743-5390 (print); 1743-5404 (web)
- LCCN: 2007254001
- OCLC no.: 123904595

Links
- Journal homepage

Nanotoxicology is a peer-reviewed, scientific journal that focuses on environmental exposure, hazard, and risk of applied nanostructured materials. It publishes research that addresses the potentially toxic interactions between nanostructured materials and living matter. The journal publishes the results of studies that enhance safety during the production, use, and disposal of nanomaterials. The editor-in-chief is Håkan Wallin (National Research Centre for the Working Environment, Denmark).

According to the Journal Citation Reports, its 2020 impact factor is 5.913.

== See also ==
- Toxicology
- Risk assessment
- Ecotoxicology
- Nanomedicine
