= Recommended exposure limit =

Limit for exposure to a chemical substance

A recommended exposure limit (REL) is an occupational exposure limit that has been recommended by the United States National Institute for Occupational Safety and Health. The REL is a level that NIOSH believes would be protective of worker safety and health over a working lifetime if used in combination with engineering and work practice controls, exposure and medical monitoring, posting and labeling of hazards, worker training and personal protective equipment. To formulate these recommendations, NIOSH evaluates all known and available medical, biological, engineering, chemical, trade, and other information. Although not legally enforceable limits, RELS are transmitted to the Occupational Safety and Health Administration (OSHA) or the Mine Safety and Health Administration (MSHA) of the U.S. Department of Labor for use in promulgating legal standards.

All RELs are located in the NIOSH Pocket Guide to Chemical Hazards, along with other key data for 677 chemical or substance groupings. The Pocket Guide is a source of general industrial hygiene information for workers, employers, and occupational health professionals.

NIOSH recommendations are also published in a variety of documents, including:

- Criteria documents – These recommend workplace exposure limits and appropriate preventive measures to reduce or eliminate adverse health effects and accidental injuries.
- Current Intelligence Bulletins (CIBs) – These share new scientific information about occupational hazards, highlighting a formerly unrecognized hazard, reporting new data on a known hazard, or presenting information on hazard control.
- Alerts, Special Hazard Reviews, Occupational Hazard Assessments, and Technical Guidelines - These assess the safety and health problems associated with a given agent or hazard and recommend appropriate control and surveillance methods. Although these documents are not intended to supplant the more comprehensive criteria documents, they are prepared to assist OSHA and MSHA in the formulation of regulation.

In addition to these publications, NIOSH periodically presents testimony before various Congressional committees and at OSHA and MSHA rulemaking hearings.

== Understanding and applying NIOSH recommended exposure limits ==
National Institute for Occupational Safety and Health (NIOSH) RELs are designed to protect the health and well-being of workers by recommending safe exposure levels. To really use these guidelines well, safety professionals need to understand the recommended exposure levels, how to measure them, and ways to make sure workers aren't exposed to harmful stuff. It's not just about knowing the numbers; it's also about checking regularly and making changes if needed to keep everyone safe.

RELs are written as time-weighted average (TWA) exposures. This TWA is calculated for a standard workday of up to 10 hours, over a 40-hour workweek. This is slightly different to permissible exposure limit (PELs), which are calculated for 8 hours over a 40-hour workweek instead. NIOSH recognizes that certain scenarios demand more immediate attention and has therefore introduced additional measures. Sometimes it's not always about the whole day and a worker might be around a lot of the stuff in a short burst. So, they set a short-term exposure limit (STEL), meaning the concentration of a substance that should never be exceeded within a specified 15-minute period. There is also a ceiling limit (C). This is a substance no one should be exposed to, even for a moment. These guidelines aim to strike a balance; it is to keep workers safe from harm without going overboard and making things inefficient in the workplace. The RELs, unlike permissible exposure limits or PELs set by OSHA, are merely guidelines -- they are not legally enforceable. An employer cannot be held liable, but they can try to implement these in the workplace. These guidelines are crucial for workplace safety. RELs undergo more frequent revisions and tend to be more stringent compared to PELs established by OSHA. The strictness inherent in RELs align with the latest scientific understanding and advancements in occupational health. This prioritizes knowledge in worker safety.
