= Threshold limit value =

Hazardous substance exposure threshold

The threshold limit value (TLV) is a level of occupational exposure to a hazardous substance where it is believed that nearly all healthy workers can repeatedly experience at or below this level of exposure without adverse effects. Strictly speaking, TLV is a reserved term of the American Conference of Governmental Industrial Hygienists (ACGIH), who determines and publishes TLVs annually. TLVs issued by the ACGIH are the most widely accepted occupational exposure limits both in the United States and most other countries. However, it is sometimes loosely used to refer to other similar concepts used in occupational health and toxicology, such as acceptable daily intake (ADI) and tolerable daily intake (TDI). Concepts such as TLV, ADI, and TDI can be compared to the no-observed-adverse-effect level (NOAEL) in animal testing, but whereas a NOAEL can be established experimentally during a short period, TLV, ADI, and TDI apply to human beings over a lifetime and thus are harder to test empirically and are usually set at lower levels. TLVs, along with biological exposure indices (BEIs), are published annually by the ACGIH.

The TLV is an estimate based on the known toxicity in humans or animals of a given chemical substance, and the reliability and accuracy of the latest sampling and analytical methods. TLVs do not take into account financial or technical feasibility for application in the workplace, instead solely focusing on health based recommendations to prevent adverse health effects. It is also not a static value, since new research can often modify the risk assessment of substances, and new laboratory or instrumental analysis methods can improve analytical detection limits.

The TLV is a recommendation by ACGIH, with only a guideline status. As such, it should not be confused with exposure limits having a regulatory status, like those published and enforced by the Occupational Safety and Health Administration(OSHA). However, many OSHA exposure limits are not considered by the industrial hygiene community to be sufficiently protective levels since the toxicological basis for most limits have not been updated since the 1960s. OSHA acknowledges this and recommends supplementing regulatory standards with alternative updated and stricter standards, "even when the exposure levels are in compliance with the relevant PELs", while specifically mentioning the TLV as one such standard.

== History ==
Many people accredit the idea of government responsibility for the protection of its workers in the workplace to Franklin D. Roosevelt in the Great Depression era. The formation of the National Conference of Governmental Industrial Hygienists (later to be renamed the American Conference of Governmental Industrial Hygienists) in 1938 was a direct response to this idea.

Although the first meeting of the ACGIH was held in 1938, the first exposure limits of the group were not published until 1946, then referred to as Maximum Allowable Concentrations. These standards were split into 4 categories: Gasses and Vapors, Toxic Dusts, Fumes, and Mists, Mineral Dusts, and Radiations.

In 1970, the US Occupational Health and Safety Act was signed into law, which created the Occupational Safety and Health Administration (OSHA) and the National Institute for Occupational Safety and Health. Shortly after this law passed, OSHA implemented its first Permissible Exposure Limits, which were adopted directly from the 1968 ACGIH TLVs.

In 2008, the Sustainable TLV/BEI fund was created to allow for the continued financial support of the development of TLVs and BEIs. This fund provides "additional opportunities for raising funds to support and sustain the core mission and value of developing and promoting occupational exposure guidelines." This fund ensures that TLVs and BEIs will continue to have the necessary financial support to be created and revised in order to provide up-to-date standards.

== Definitions of TLV ==
The TLV for chemical substances is defined as a concentration in air, typically for inhalation or skin exposure. Its units are in parts per million (ppm) for gases and in milligrams per cubic meter (mg/m^{3}) for particulates such as dust, smoke and mist. The basic formula for converting between ppm and mg/m^{3} for gases is ppm = (mg/m^3) * 24.45 / molecular weight. This formula is not applicable to airborne particles.

The four categories of TLVs for chemical substances are defined:

1. Threshold limit value − time-weighted average (TLV-TWA): The average exposure on the basis of a 8 hours per day, 40 hours per week work schedule.
2. Threshold limit value − short-term exposure limit (TLV-STEL): A 15-minute TWA exposure that should not be exceeded at any time during a workday, even if the 8-hour TWA is within the TLV-TWA.
3. Threshold limit value - surface limit (TLV-SL): Supplements airborne TLVs by establishing a concentration on a surface that is not likely to cause an adverse effect due to direct or indirect contact.
4. Threshold limit value − ceiling limit (TLV-C): An absolute exposure limit that should not be exceeded at any time.

There are TLVs for physical agents as well as chemical substances. TLVs for physical agents include those for noise exposure, vibration, ionizing and non-ionizing radiation exposure and heat and cold stress.

== Defining acceptable exposure ==
The TLV and most other occupational exposure limits are based on available toxicology and epidemiology data to protect nearly all workers over a working lifetime. Exposure assessments in occupational settings are most often performed by Occupational / Industrial Hygiene (OH/IH) professionals who gather "Basic Characterization" consisting of all relevant information and data related to workers, agents of concern, materials, equipment and available exposure controls. The exposure assessment is initiated by selecting the appropriate exposure limit averaging time and "decision statistic" for the agent. Typically the statistic for deciding acceptable exposure is chosen to be the majority (90%, 95% or 99%) of all exposures to be below the selected occupational exposure limit. For retrospective exposure assessments performed in occupational environments, the "decision statistic" is typically a central tendency such as the mean or geometric mean or median for each worker or group of workers. Methods for performing occupational exposure assessments can be found in "A Strategy for Assessing and Managing Occupational Exposures, Third Edition Edited by Joselito S. Ignacio and William H. Bullock".

== TLV Development Process ==
The process for developing a new or updated TLVs follows a specific process that allows for adequate analysis of available research and feedback from exposure scientists around the world. The process also allows for opportunities at each step for the TLV to be withdrawn from consideration due to lack of available data or other reasons. The process adheres to the following steps:

1. Substance Under Study: When a substance or agent has been proposed for a new or updated TLV or BEI, it is placed under a list of possible candidates in this step. These substances can be submitted for review by the public to the several committees in ACGIH, who then determine if they are eligible to be placed on the "under study" list. This list is available to the public.
2. Draft Documentation: Once a substance has been accepted to the Under Study list, the process of collecting relevant studies and research is collected. This allows for the designated committee to develop a draft with these studies and a proposed TLV or BEI. This is then reviewed by other committee and eventually the full committee. If passed, the proposed TLV moves to step 3.
3. Notice of Intended Changes and Notice of Intent to Establish: After the full committee has approved a potential TLV or BEI with its relevant research, it is presented to the ACGIH Board of Directors for ratification. If approved, it is published as a Notice of Intended Changes or Notice of Intent to Establish, where other parties are invited to submit relevant feedback. If data is introduced that may impact the proposed TLV/BEI, the proposal may be revised or withdrawn.
4. Adoption: If there is no data or feedback presented that indicates a necessary change in the proposed TLV or BEI, it is adopted and published in the annual TLV/BEI documentation.

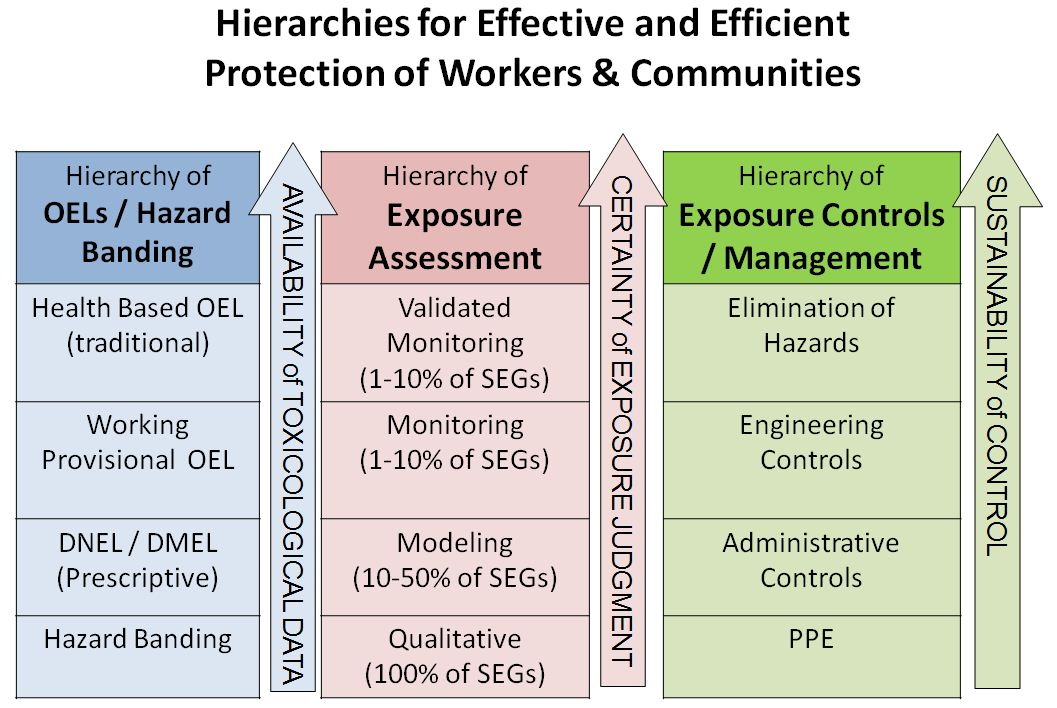
Simple representation of exposure risk assessment and management hierarchy based on available information

== Similar concepts ==
The TLV is equivalent in spirit to various occupational exposure limits developed by organizations around the world; however, the materials covered, values recommended, and definitions used can differ amongst organizations. These occupational exposure limits include:

=== United States ===
- WEEL (Workplace Environmental Exposure Level), formerly created by a committee of the American Industrial Hygiene Association; as of January 1, 2012, new WEELs are created by a committee of volunteers that is supported by the Occupational Alliance for Risk Science.

=== Other countries ===
- Australia
  - OES Occupational exposure standard
- Austria
  - TRK (Technische Richtkonzentration trans. Technical Approximate Concentration )
  - MAK (Maximale Arbeitsplatz-Konzentration trans. Maximum Workplace Concentration)
- Brazil
  - LT (Limite de tolerância)
- France
  - VME (Valeur Moyenne d'Exposition)
  - VLE (Valeur Limite d'Exposition)
- Germany
  - AGW (Arbeitsplatzgrenzwert trans. Workplace Limit Value)
  - MAK (Maximale Arbeitsplatz-Konzentration trans. Maximum Workplace Concentration)
- Indonesia
  - NAB (Nilai ambang batas)
- Malaysia
  - PEL (Permissible exposure limit)
- Netherlands
  - MAC (Maximaal Aanvaardbare Concentratie trans. Maximum Acceptable Concentration)
- New Zealand
  - WES (Workplace Exposure Standards)
- Poland
  - NDS (Najwyższe dopuszczalne stężenie)
- Russia
  - ПДК (предельно допустимая концентрация)
- Spain
  - VLA (Valor Límite Ambiental)
- UK
  - WEL (Workplace Exposure Limit)
- Ukrainian
  - ГДК (Гранично допустима концентрація)

== Antonymic concepts ==
The opposite of "safe enough for any length of time" is "not safe for any length of time", and IDLH values are defined for concentrations of substances that are immediately dangerous to life or health.

== See also ==
- Exposure Assessment
