= Anna Baetjer =

American physiologist

Anna M. Baetjer
- Born: July 7, 1899; Baltimore, Maryland
- Died: February 21, 1984 (aged 84)
- Education: Wellesley College; Johns Hopkins University
- Awards: Kehoe Award of the American Academy of Occupational Medicine (1974); Stokinger Award of the American Conference of Governmental Industrial Hygienists (1980)
- Scientific career
- Fields: Physiology, toxicology
- Workplaces: Johns Hopkins School of Hygiene and Public Health

Anna Medora Baetjer (July 7, 1899 – February 21, 1984) was an American physiologist and toxicologist, known for her research into the health effects of industrial work on women and for her discovery of the carcinogenic properties of chromium.

== Early life ==
Anna Baetjer was born in Baltimore, Maryland on July 7, 1899. In 1920, she graduated from Wellesley College, receiving a B.A. in English literature and zoology. Following her graduation, she returned to Baltimore to study at Johns Hopkins University, receiving her Sc.D. from the university's Johns Hopkins School of Hygiene and Public Health in 1924.

In 1924, Baetjer joined the faculty of the School of Hygiene and Public Health, becoming an instructor in the Department of Physiological Hygiene. She became a research associate at the department in 1927.

Baetjer's early research focused on the effects of altitude and temperature on physiology. Prompted by concerns of increased lead poisoning among Baltimore children during the summer months, Baetjer conducted a study that demonstrated a link between high temperature and humidity and slower toxin excretion.

In 1931, the Department of Physiological Hygiene lost its chief advocate with the retirement of William Henry Howell, a Physiological Hygiene professor who had served as the director of the School of Hygiene and Public Health. Over the next several years, the other faculty in the department departed or were fired, and in 1935, the department was finally merged into the Department of Chemical Hygiene. For the next 15 years, Baetjer would remain the only faculty member for Physiological Hygiene.

== World War II ==
In 1942, the Surgeon General of the United States Army established the Industrial Hygiene Laboratory at the School of Hygiene and Public Health. Working at the laboratory, Baetjer studied the impact of military industrial work on women's health and the effects of physiological and sociological factors on women's job performance. As a result of her research, Baetjer proposed a number of changes, including adjusting industrial machinery so that it could be safely operated by women, limiting women to working to six days per week and adjusting their work schedules to take household responsibilities into account, and educating women on safe ways to lift and carry heavy loads.

In 1944, the War Department issued a set of policies on pregnancy and civilian workers based on Baetjer's recommendations. The policies limited work assigned to pregnant women, prohibited work assignments that posed a threat to the health of pregnant women; and protected women's seniority and job security during pregnancy.

In 1946, Baetjer published the book Women in Industry: Their Health and Efficiency containing the results of her research.

== Cancer research ==
During the 1940s, Baetjer began to investigate the incidence of cancer in a Baltimore chromium plant and waste pile. Following a number of studies, Baetjer demonstrated a direct link between chromium exposure and cancer. She subsequently worked with the World Health Organization to establish standards for industrial chromium use.

== Later career ==
Following the war, Baetjer continued her work at the School of Hygiene and Public Health, becoming an assistant professor in 1945, an associate professor in 1952, a professor in 1962, and a professor emerita in 1972. She was elected president of the American Industrial Hygiene Association in 1954.

From 1966 to 1970, Baetjer served on a committee organized by the Food and Drug Administration to study pesticide residues. In 1974, she demonstrated that exposure to inorganic arsenic led to increased cancer risk for workers at pesticide plants.

Baetjer served as an advisor to the National Research Council, the Environmental Protection Agency, the Army Environmental Hygiene Agency, and the Office of the Surgeon General. She received the Kehoe Award of the American Academy of Occupational Medicine in 1974. She received two awards from the American Industrial Hygiene Association: the Donald E. Cummings Award in 1964 and the Alice Hamilton Award (posthumously) in 1997. She also received the Stokinger Award of the American Conference of Governmental Industrial Hygienists in 1980.

In 1985, Johns Hopkins University established the Anna M. Baetjer Chair in Environmental Health Sciences.

== Selected publications ==
- Baetjer, Anna Medora (1946), Women in Industry: Their Health and Efficiency, Philadelphia: W. B. Saunders, OCLC 308330
- Baetjer, Anna Medora (1948), "Results of Influenza Vaccination in Industry during the 1947 Epidemic", Preventative Medicine and Public Health, Pittsburgh, OCLC 14661339
