= Assiniboine Valley Railway =

Miniature railway in Winnipeg, Canada

Coordinates: 49.8703°N 97.2505°W

Overview
- Headquarters: Winnipeg
- Locale: Manitoba, Canada
- Dates of operation: 1995–2021

Technical
- Track gauge: 7 1/2 in (190.5 mm)
- Length: 6,000 feet (1,800 m)

Other
- Website: www.assiniboinevalleyrailway.org

Assiniboine Valley Railway (AVR) was a private 1:8th (1.6" to the foot) scale ridable miniature railway located in the community of Charleswood near Assiniboine Park in Winnipeg, Manitoba, Canada.

The railway used track gauge 7 1/2 in (190.5 mm). Construction started in 1995 and operation began in the fall of 1996. A train station was eventually built along the track, and opened on time for a convention in May, 2000.

The railway's assets are owned by the 23-member Assiniboine Valley Railway Club, Inc., with some of the equipment privately owned by members. The railway club president and owner of the land was Bill Taylor until his death in 2013. Presidency then transferred to vice president and co-founder Len La Rue. The network of tracks and "Charleswood Station" was located on Taylor's private 7-acre (2.8 ha) property.

AVR was open to the public for riding during the second weekend of the month between June and October. As of April 2012 the railway had nine operating locomotives, including three steam locomotives and 53 cars, with eight more cars under construction. In the span of 26 years, the club laid more than 6,000 feet (1,800 m) of track.

During the COVID-19 pandemic, the club had to close to the public as a result of provincial public health orders.

In April 2021, the family of AVR's late founder initially requested that the railway club vacate the property within six months. This was completed in autumn of 2022 following a deadline extension.

The AVR has asked for financial support from the public, in order to relocate the railway.

== History ==
The AVR was founded in 1995 by Bill Taylor, and was located entirely on Taylor's property, in Winnipeg's Charleswood area. The railway had its official grand opening on September 13 1997, in a ceremony attended by Manitoba lieutenant governor Yvon Dumont. The railroad's slogan "Route of the Hazel Nuts" was chosen to reflect the hazel nut bushes which grew around the track.

Until 2019, the AVR offered a "Dinner train Weekend" taking place on the 3rd weekend of September, where riders were able to enjoy a meal while riding the model trains. The meal typically included refreshments, salad, hotdogs and hamburgers.

The AVR was best known for its most popular Christmas events in December. In 2011-2012, approximately 17,000 passengers rode the AVR during the Holiday period. In the early years of the railway, Christmas light runs were operated every night from 6:30 pm till 9:00 pm. from the second weekend of December to the first weekend of January. Christmas lights were used along the line, their numbers growing from 98,000 in 2009 to more than 100,000, reaching 101,213 by December 9, 2012.

On August 26 2013, the railway's founder Bill Taylor died. Because of Taylor's significant role in the AVR's operations, the annual Christmas events were cancelled for 2013.

In 2018, the railway added a Halloween event called "The Halloween Train."

On April 23, 2021 the AVR announced that the railway would no longer be able to operate on the Taylor's property. As a result, the AVR moved its rolling stock into storage and most of the physical infrastructure was removed by the fall of 2022.

== See also ==
- List of heritage railways in Canada
- Model train scales
- Model train
