= Jacques Fradin =

French psychotherapist (born 1954)

Jacques Fradin (born 1954 in France) is a physician and cognitive and behavioural therapist (member of the French Association for Cognitive and Behavioural Therapy). He is working on developing a neuroscientific approach of the cognitive and behavioural therapy (CBT): the neurocognitive and behavioural therapy. He founded the Institute of Environmental Medicine in 1987 where he is managing a team of researchers and PhD students in cognitive and behavioural neurosciences in collaboration with Paris 8 University and the IRBA (Institut de Recherche Biomédicale des Armées). Dpt. A.C.S.O. Fradin is an APM (Association Progrès du Management) and PUCA (Plan Urbanisme Construction et Architecture) expert.

He lectures at the University of Bourgogne (Faculty of Pharmacy, Dijon, university diploma "Alimentation Santé et Micronutrition") and at the Scientific Institute for Intelligent Nutrition (SIIN).
