= Journal of Occupational and Environmental Hygiene =

- Discipline: Occupational medicine, environmental medicine
- Language: English
- Edited by: Michael D. Larrañaga

Publication details
- Former names: Applied Occupational and Environmental Hygiene; AIHA Journal
- History: 2004–present
- Publisher: Taylor & Francis
- Frequency: Monthly
- Impact factor: 1.462 (2017)

Standard abbreviations
- ISO 4: J. Occup. Environ. Hyg.

Indexing
- ISSN: 1545-9624 (print); 1545-9632 (web)
- LCCN: 2003215652
- OCLC no.: 52827368

Links
- Journal homepage; Online access; Online archive

The Journal of Occupational and Environmental Hygiene is a monthly peer-reviewed journal covering occupational and environmental medicine, especially in regards to hygiene. It was established in 2004 by the merger of Applied Occupational and Environmental Hygiene and AIHA Journal. It is published by Taylor & Francis along with the American Industrial Hygiene Association and the American Conference of Governmental Industrial Hygienists, of which it is the official journal. The editor-in-chief is Michael D. Larrañaga. According to the Journal Citation Reports, the journal has a 2017 impact factor of 1.462.

AIHA Journal dates back to 1940, while Applied Occupational and Environmental Hygiene dates back to 1986.

== History ==
The history of the journal traces back to 1940 with the foundation of American Industrial Hygiene Association Quarterly, and 1986 with the foundation of Applied Industrial Hygiene. A timeline is given below.

- 1940 - American Industrial Hygiene Association Quarterly is established
- 1958 - The journal renames itself American Industrial Hygiene Association Journal
- 2000 - The journal renames itself AIHAJ - American Industrial Hygiene Association
- 2002 - The journal renames itself AIHA Journal
- 1986 - Applied Industrial Hygiene is established
- 1990 - The journal renames itself Applied Occupational and Environmental Hygiene

Then in 2004, both journals merge to form Journal of Occupational and Environmental Hygiene.
