= Don Chaffin =

American engineer

Don Chaffin (born 1939) is an American engineer currently the R. G. Snyder Distinguished University Professor Emeritus at University of Michigan and an Elected Fellow to the American Institute for Medical and Biological Engineering, American Industrial Hygiene Association, Society of Automotive Engineers, American Association for the Advancement of Science, Ergonomics Society, Human Factors and Ergonomics Society.

Chaffin was also elected a member of the National Academy of Engineering in 1994 for fundamental engineering contributions to and leadership in occupational biomechanics and industrial ergonomics.
