= American Industrial Hygiene Association =

Non-profit organization

The American Industrial Hygiene Association (AIHA) is a 501(c)6 non-profit organization, whose mission is "Creating knowledge to protect worker health." The American Industrial Hygiene Association works to provide information and resources to Industrial Hygienists and Occupational Health professionals.

== About ==
The American Industrial Hygiene Association (AIHA) is an official participant of the OSHA Alliance Program. Through the AIHA-OSHA Alliance, AIHA helps OSHA provide AIHA members and the general public information on OSHA's rule making and employer compliance laws, in order to fulfill the mutual mission of ensuring safe and healthy conditions for workers. The actionable plan is twofold: 1). raise awareness, and 2). be a source of outreach and communication. AIHA worked with OSHA to provide resources available to employers and employees regarding specific hazards pertaining to relevant industries, in order to create awareness with workers and employers. AIHA has provided several additional educational documents through the OSHA Alliance program, specifically on the construction industry, which has been widely affected by the silica rule.

== Role in Industrial Hygiene ==
The practice of industrial hygiene, also known as occupational hygiene or occupational health, is a relatively modern idea, pioneered principally by Alice Hamilton and is often referred to as the "mother of industrial hygiene."

== History ==
The AIHA was founded in 1939 by a cross-disciplinary group of professionals and government agencies concerned with worker health.

The history of the American Industrial Hygiene Association began in the 1930s with interested people already meeting together under the auspices of other organizations to include the American Public Health Association, the American Chemical Society, the National Safety Council, and the American Society of Heating and Ventilating Engineers. In 1938 the board of directors of the American Association of Industrial Physicians and Surgeons (AAIPS) organized a permanent American Conference on Occupational Diseases in response to a massive outbreak of lead poisonings in the automotive industry. Dr. Carey P. McCord as chairman of the Conference proposed the creation of an independent association of industrial hygienist who were not physicians and would operate under the name of the American Industrial Hygiene Conference.

The 24th annual meeting of the AAIPS was held in June 1939 in Cleveland, Ohio during which an organizational meeting for the establishment of an industrial hygiene association was held on June 6, 1939. Initially the association was to be named the Society of Industrial Hygienists however was not supported and the consensus agreed on the name of the American Industrial Hygiene Association (AIHA). Three officers for the new association were elected with William Yant, president; Warren Cook, president-elect; and Gordon A. Harrold, secretary-treasurer. The AIHA had 160 members at its start and paid annual dues of $3.00. Harrold reported from the first board of directors meeting on October 18, 1939, that the four major goals of the Association were: 1. The advancement and application of industrial hygiene and sanitation through the interchange and dissemination of technical knowledge on these subjects. 2. The furthering of study and control of industrial health hazards through determination and elimination of excessive exposures. 3. The correlation of such activities as conducted by diverse individuals and agencies throughout industry, educational and governmental groups. 4. The uniting of persons with these interests.

Since 1940, the AIHA Has published an academic journal on matters related to public health, the AIHA Journal.

The AIHA is headquartered in Falls Church, Virginia, and has chapters throughout the United States. AIHA celebrated their 70-year anniversary in 2009, and cited a timeline of historical milestones, including publication of The Synergist, which started as a quarterly newsletter in 1989.

== Mission ==
The AIHA often collaborates with NIOSH on matters of public education, and is frequently cited in the news media as an authority on public health issues.

The AIHA also gives an annual award for social responsibility.

== Role in 2014 Ebola Crisis ==
After two people within the United States were diagnosed as having contracted Ebola, AIHA Executive Director Peter O'Neil sent letters to infectious disease expert and then director of the CDC, Tom Frieden, the White House, former director of NIOSH John Howard, and former Assistant Secretary of Labor at OSHA Dr. David Michaels urging readiness and protection of workers particularly vulnerable to contracting the virus, such as health research laboratory facility workers. O'Neil identified industrial hygienists as having an increasingly important role in mitigating the crises, as more workers become involved in containing the outbreak. AIHA further provided additional resources and guidances in light of a potential pandemic.

== Role in Protecting Workers from Silicosis ==
AIHA hosted a Congressional briefing on Capitol Hill at the Longworth Office Building on February 15, 2017. Government relations director, Mark Ames organized the event; the panel included AIHA CEO Larry Sloan, epidemiologist and former Assistant Secretary of Labor at OSHA Dr. David Michaels, past president at AIHA Dan H. Anna. Russ Hayward, CIH, was also on hand to provide support with expertise, as AIHA's Managing Director of Scientific and Technical Initiatives. The purpose of the event was to emphasize the importance of keeping the silica standard enforceable, backed by the silica rule, which is based on 19 years of active research

== Outreach ==
AIHA sponsors several annual awards and honors recognizing excellence in the field of industrial hygiene, as well as designating members as AIHA Fellows and Honorary Members of the organization.

=== Edward J. Baier Technical Achievement Award ===
Founded in 1984 and named after, this award recognizes significant contributions in industrial hygiene in the area of technical expertise or innovation, significant research or advancement, and influence and interaction with other scientific disciplines. Notable recipients of the Baier Award include: Dennis J. Paustenbach (2010) and Don B. Chaffin (1994).

=== Distinguished Service Awards ===
Founded in 1978, this award recognizes unique contributions to the advancement of the field and the mandate of the association.

=== Donald E. Cummings Memorial Award ===
Established in 1943, recipients of this award have demonstrated a lifelong contributions to the profession as well as acknowledgments of their contributions outside of their field. Notable recipients of this award include: Mary O. Amdur (1974), Anna M. Baetjer (1964), Robert A. Kehoe (1962 and 1975), Philip Drinker (1950) and Alice Hamilton (1948).

=== Alice Hamilton Award ===
Established in 1993, the Alice Hamilton award recognizes women in the profession who have made a definitive and lasting achievement in the field of occupational and environmental hygiene. Notable recipients of this award include: Notable recipients of this award include: Eula Bingham (1995), Anna M. Baetjer (1997, posthumous award), Linda Rosenstock (1999), and Earl Dotter (2001).

=== Kusnetz Award ===
Founded in 1987 and named after donors Florence and Howard Kusnetz, this award recognizes a certified industrial hygienist that demonstrates high ethical standards and shows promise of leadership in the profession. Notable recipients of this award include: Dennis Pustenbach (1992).

=== Henry F. Smyth Jr. Award ===
Established in 1981, this award recognizes the contributions of individuals to the improvement of public welfare. Notable recipients of the Smyth Award includes: Dennis Paustenbach (2010), Eula Bingham (1998), and Mary O. Amdur (1984).

=== Social Responsibility Award ===
Established in 2009, this award recognizes an individual, group, or organization that works to promote practical solutions to social responsibility issues related to industrial hygiene or environmental health and safety.

=== William P. Yant Award ===
Founded in 1964 and named after founding president William P. Yant, this award recognizes individuals for their "outstanding contributions in industrial hygiene or allied fields" who reside outside the United States. Notable recipients of the Yant award include Karen Messing (2014) and René Truhaut (1980).

== Annual Conference ==
An annual conference of industrial hygienist has been an essential element of the AIHA as in 1938 when the board of directors of the American Association of Industrial Physicians and Surgeons (AAIPS) organized a permanent American Conference on Occupational Diseases.

It was at this conference that Dr. Carey P. McCord, as chairman of the Conference, proposed the creation of an independent association of industrial hygienist who were not physicians and would operate under the name of the American Industrial Hygiene Conference.

The 24th annual meeting of the AAIPS was held in June 1939 in Cleveland, Ohio during which an organizational meeting for the establishment of an industrial hygiene association was held on June 6, 1939, that the AIHA was created. The AAIPS and the AIHA would continue to meet together annually until 1960 when they split apart. The AIHA joined with the American Conference of Governmental Industrial Hygienist (ACGIH) in 1961 to sponsor an annual industrial hygiene conference. Despite concerns of the recent split with the AAIPS, the first conference was a success as all exhibit spaces were sold out, scientific exhibits were so numerous that they had to be placed in the halls and 688 industrial hygienists attended the meeting held in Detroit, Michigan.

With the stimulation by the OSHA Act of 1970, attendance at the annual conferences continued to grow so much that by 1980 the meetings had to be held at convention centers with the Houston Texas conference held in the Albert Thomas Convention Center. Attendance at the 1980 meeting was 5,006 and by 1990 it grew to 8,620 attendees.

A major reason for the growth and success of the conference has been attributed to the technical program that also grew from 233 presentations in 1973 to 456 in 1990.

== International Occupational Hygiene Association (IOHA) International Scientific Conference ==
AIHA won the bid to host the 11th Annual IOHA conference in Washington DC.
