= Short-term exposure limit =

A short-term exposure limit (STEL) is the acceptable average exposure over a short period of time, usually 15 minutes as long as the time-weighted average is not exceeded.

STEL is a term used in exposure assessment, occupational health, industrial hygiene and toxicology. The STEL may be a legal limit in the United States for exposure of an employee to a chemical substance. The Occupational Safety and Health Administration (U.S. OSHA) has set OSHA-STELs for 1,3-butadiene, benzene and ethylene oxide. For chemicals, STEL assessments are usually done for 15 minutes and expressed in parts per million (ppm), or sometimes in milligrams per cubic meter (mg/m^{3}).

The American Conference of Governmental Industrial Hygienists publishes a more extensive list of STELs as threshold limit values (TLV-STEL).

== Similar national exposure limits ==
- United Kingdom
  - COSHH (Control of Substances Hazardous to Health).
- Australia
  - OES Occupational Exposure Standard
- France
  - VLEP 8h00 (Valeur Limite d’Exposition Professionnelle 8h00)
  - VLEP CT (Valeur Limite d’Exposition Professionnelle Court Terme)
- Netherlands
  - MAC (Maximaal Aanvaarde Concentratie)
- Malaysia
  - PEL (Permissible Exposure Limits)
- Poland
  - NDSCh (Najwyższe dopuszczalne stężenie chwilowe)
- Russia
  - ПДК (предельно допустимая концентрация)

== See also ==
- Permissible exposure limit
- Exposure action value
