= Philip Drinker =

American inventor (1894–1972)

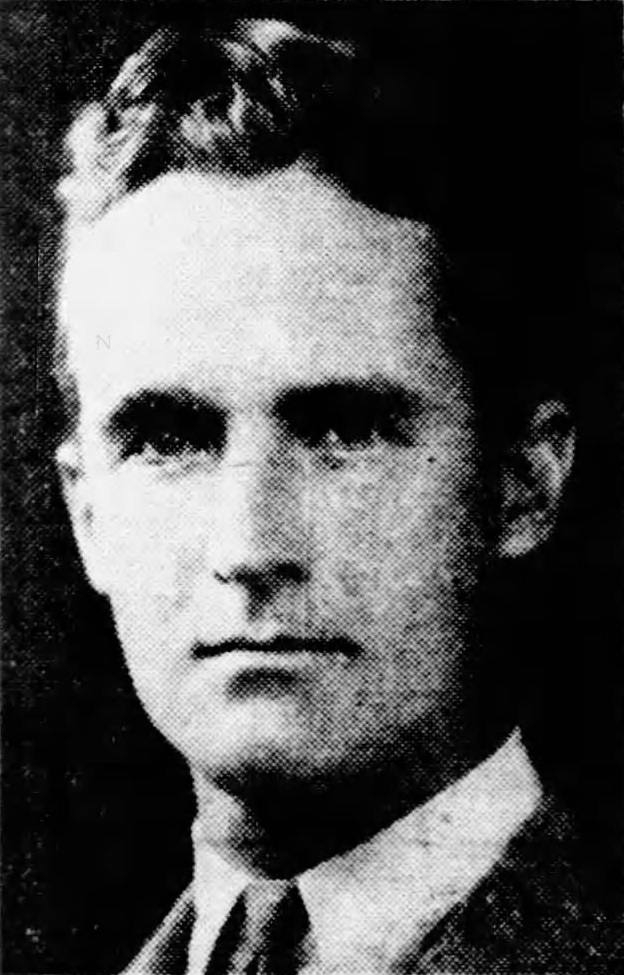
- Philip Drinker c. 1939
- Born: December 12, 1894; Haverford, Pennsylvania
- Died: October 19, 1972 (aged 77); Fitzwilliam, New Hampshire
- Engineering career
- Projects: Iron lung

Philip Drinker (December 12, 1894 – October 19, 1972) was an American industrial hygienist. With Louis Agassiz Shaw, he invented the first widely used iron lung in 1928.

== Family and early life ==
Drinker's father was railroad man and Lehigh University president Henry Sturgis Drinker; his siblings included lawyer and musicologist Henry Sandwith Drinker, Jr., pathologist Cecil Kent Drinker, businessman James Drinker, and biographer Catherine Drinker Bowen. After graduating from St. George's and Princeton University in 1915, Philip Drinker trained as a chemical engineer at Lehigh University for two years.

Drinker was hired to teach industrial illumination and ventilation at Harvard Medical School and soon joined his brother Cecil and colleagues Alice Hamilton and David L. Edsall on the faculty of the nascent Harvard School of Public Health in 1921 or 1923. He studied, taught, and wrote textbooks and scholarly works on a variety of topics in industrial hygiene; the iron lung itself was originally designed in response to an industrial hygiene problem—coal gas poisoning—though it would become best known as a life-preserving treatment for polio. Charles Momsen credited Drinker "and his friends" for their assistance with gas-mixture experiments that ultimately made possible the rescue of the survivors of the USS Squalus in 1939.

== Career ==
During World War II, Drinker directed the industrial hygiene program for the United States Maritime Commission. He also arranged and participated in a survey of four shipyards in 1945 to evaluate exposure to asbestos dust during the installation of asbestos-containing insulation. The study had many limitations: 1) The investigators used a non-standard means of collecting and quantitating asbestos dust, key details of which were not disclosed, and 2) Almost all of the shipyard insulators studied were recent hires, 95% had worked as insulators for less than 10 years, many for less than 5 years. Asbestosis, the disease they were concerned with, typically takes 15-20 years of exposure to asbestos dust to manifest. Despite these limitations, the key conclusion of the "Fleischer-Drinker" study was that "...pipe covering is not a dangerous occupation."

Thus, for the next twenty years, the Navy failed to effectively protect its shipyard workers from asbestos, leading to tens of thousands of cases of asbestosis, lung cancer and mesothelioma. Only in the mid-1960s did the Navy and others start to repudiate this defective conclusion. Subsequently, this report has been used by many attorneys to argue that nobody could have known that asbestos insulation work was dangerous until further studies finally appeared in 1964-5.

After the war, Drinker advised the Atomic Energy Commission.

Drinker served as editor-in-chief of The Journal of Industrial Hygiene for over thirty years and, in 1942, as president of the American Industrial Hygiene Association, to which he had belonged since its inception.

He retired from Harvard in 1960 or 1961. Drinker received the Donald E. Cummings Award from the American Industrial Hygiene Association in 1950. He was later inducted into the US National Inventor's Hall of Fame in 2007.

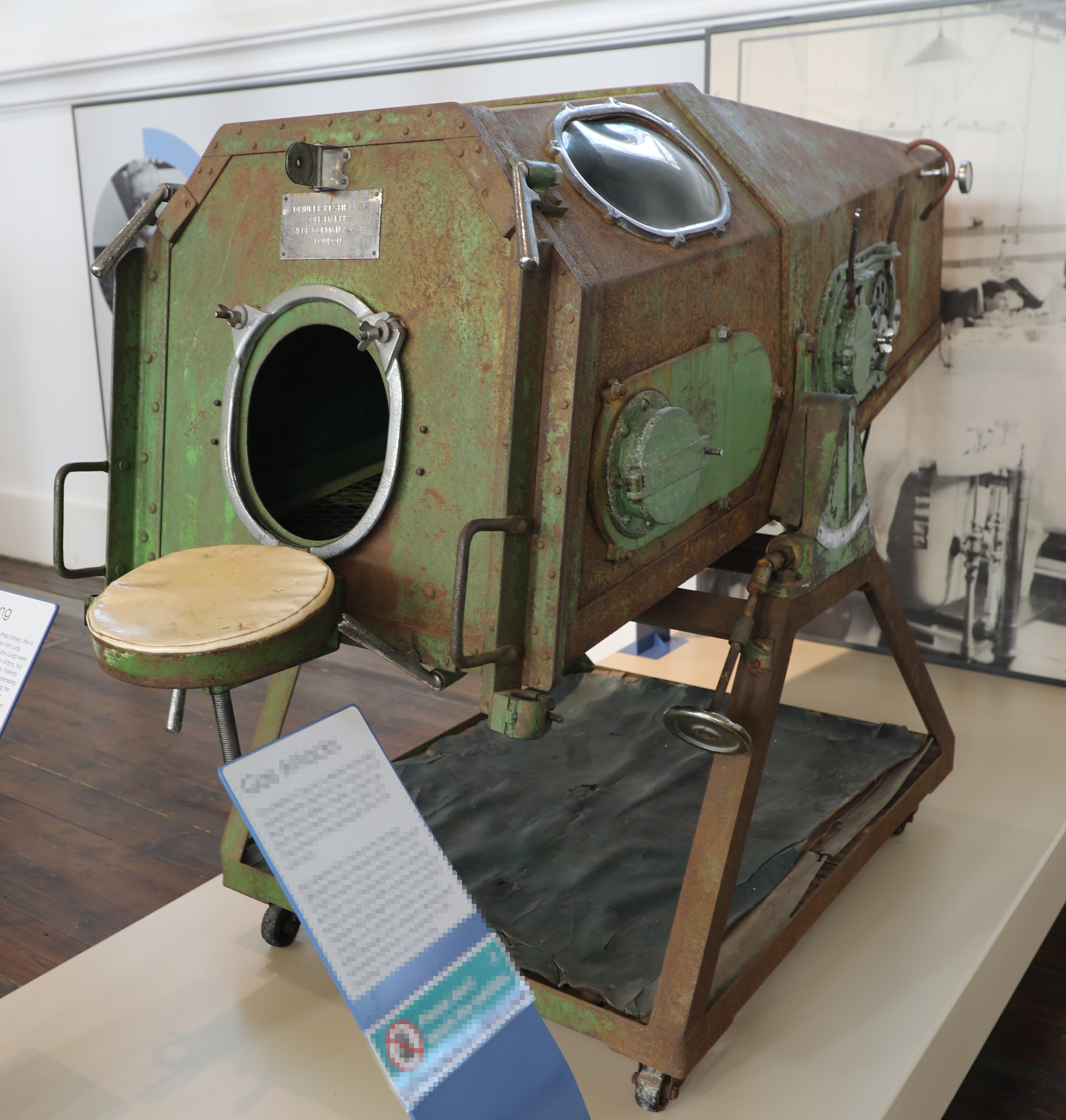
A Drinker iron lung

He and his wife Susan had a son, bioengineer Philip A. Drinker, and 2 daughters, Susan Drinker Moran (1926-2010), author, and Eliza Scudder, educator.

== Publications ==
- Shaw, LA; Drinker, P (1929). "An Apparatus for the Prolonged Administration of Artificial Respiration: I. A Design for Adults and Children". J Clin Invest. 7 (2): 229–47. doi:10.1172/JCI100226. PMC 434785. PMID 16693859.
- Shaw, LA; Drinker, P (1929). "An Apparatus for the Prolonged Administration of Artificial Respiration: II. A Design for Small Children and Infants with an Appliance for the Administration of Oxygen and Carbon Dioxide". J Clin Invest. 8 (1): 33–46. doi:10.1172/JCI100253. PMC 424606. PMID 16693884.
