= Institute of Environmental Medicine =

The Institute of Environmental Medicine (IEM) is partner of Paris 8 University, of IMASSA (French Army's Institute of Aerospace Medicine) and of "Architecture et Développement" (Sonia Cortesse). Created the year 1987 in Paris and launched by Jacques Fradin, it consists of a team of research neuroscientists and neuroscientists. The IEM is both dedicated to neuroscience research and neuroscience consulting within the transfer of innovative management skills, in order to offer neuroscience and behavioral sciences resources to economic, institutional and social authorities, within the framework of sustainable development. The IEM is a French OSEO Innovation partner company.

The IME has a dual vocation of research and transfer of skills to economic, institutional, health and social players, with a view to sustainable development.

The first vocation of the Institute, assumed by its Research division, is to develop research in "medicine of lifestyles (en)" (environmental medicine), interdisciplinary in essence, which affects areas as varied as behavior, occupational health or the environment.

The second vocation of the IME, assumed by its Consulting Division, is to transfer skills between interdisciplinary scientific research and the fields of health, management and organization.

Directed by Prof. Farid El Massioui, the Psychology & Neurosciences Laboratory (LPN) of the Research Division carries out interdisciplinary work in basic and clinical research, at the crossroads of cognitive-behavioral therapies (CBT) and science:

- neurosciences (neurology, neuropsychology, cognitive neurosciences, and social neurosciences, etc.);
- cognitive, clinical, and social psychology;
- behavioral sciences, ethology.
