= René Truhaut =

French toxicologist (1909–1994)

René Truhaut (May 23, 1909 – May 10, 1994) was a French toxicologist. He was made chairman of the department of toxicology at the Paris Faculty of Medicine. He is known for having introduced the concept of daily intake in 1956, and for popularazing the term "ecotoxicology" (it was instead coined by Professor Jean-Michel Jouany) which defined it as "the branch of toxicology concerned with the study of toxic effects, caused by natural or synthetic pollutants, to the constituents of ecosystems, animal (including human), vegetable and microbial, in an integral context”.

== Publications ==
René Truhaut wrote a Handbook of occupational medicine, a book reprinted several times, which became a classic of this discipline, and hundreds of articles in major scientific journals. Here is the list of his main publications:

- Truhaut René-Charles-Joseph, Les Dérivés organiques halogénés doués d’activité insecticide, Paris, S.E.D.E.S, 1948
- Truhaut René-Charles-Joseph, Principales tendances actuelles de la chimiothérapie anticancéreuse, Paris, Editions Labo-pharma, 1957
- Truhaut René-Charles-Joseph, Nouvelles recherches sur l’étiologie du " bouton d’huile", Paris, Institut national de sécurité, 1958
- Truhaut René-Charles-Joseph, Toxicologie des produits phytopharmaceutiques (et compléments de législation), leçons professées à la Faculté de pharmacie de Paris, Paris, Société d’édition d’enseignement supérieur, 1954
- Truhaut René et Fabre René, Précis de toxicologie, Paris, Société d’édition d’enseignement supérieur, 1960-
- Truhaut René, Souverain R., Contrôle des substances ajoutées aux aliments, Rome, Organisation des Nations Unies pour l’alimentation et l’agriculture, 1963
- Truhaut René, Fabre René, Régnier M-T, Traitement d’urgence des intoxications, Paris, G.Doin, 1957
- Truhaut René-Charles-Joseph, Principales données actuelles sur les facteurs chimiques de cancérisation, Paris, Presses documentaires, 1953
- Truhaut René-Charles-Joseph, Notice sur les titres et travaux scientifiques de René Truhaut, Paris, Société d’édition d’enseignement supérieur, 1967
- Truhaut René-Charles-Joseph, Fiches de travaux pratiques de chimie de 4e année, Paris, Société d’édition d’enseignement supérieur, 1957-
- Truhaut René-Charles-Joseph, Fiches de travaux pratiques de chimie de 4e année, Paris, Société d’édition d’enseignement supérieur, 1958
- Truhaut René-Charles-Joseph, Fiches de travaux pratiques de chimie de 4e année, Paris, Société d’édition d’enseignement supérieur, 1965
- Truhaut René et Sannié Charles, Les Agents chimiques cancérigènes, Paris, Masson, 1934
- Truhaut René-Charles-Joseph, Les fluoroses, leur importance en hygiène industrielle et en hygiène alimentaire, les méthodes analytiques applicables à leur étude, Paris, Sedes, 1948
- Truhaut René-Charles-Joseph, La Benzidine, toxicologie, rôle dans l’étiologie des cancers vésicaux professionnels, Paris, Institut national de sécurité pour la prévention des accidents du travail et des maladies professionnelles, 1960
- Truhaut René-Charles-Joseph, Recherches sur la toxicologie du thallium, Paris, Institut national de sécurité pour la prévention des accidents du travail et des maladies professionnelles, 1958
- Truhaut René, Sannié Charles, Précipitation spontanée du cholestérol dans un plasma, Paris, G.Doin, 1935
- Sous la dir. De René Truhaut, Symposium international sur les limites tolérables pour les substances toxiques dans l’industrie, Paris, Institut national de sécurité, 1965
- Truhaut René, Sannié Charles, Précipitation spontanée du cholestérol dans un plasma sanguin, Tours, impr. De arrault, 1935
- Truhaut René-Charles-Joseph, Les effets biologiques du thallium, étude analytique, biochimique, pharmacodynamique et toxicologique, Paris, Dermont, 1952
- Truhaut René, Sannié Charles, Le pouvoir mercuro-réducteur urinaire des cancéreux, Paris, Masson, 1933
- Truhaut René, Scherrer J., Desoille H, Précis de médecine du travail, Paris, Masson, 1975, 1978, 1980, 1987, 1991
- Truhaut René-Charles-Joseph, Les fluoroses, leur importance en hygiène industrielle et en hygiène alimentaire, les méthodes analytiques applicables à leur étude, Paris, S.E.D.E.S, 1948
- Truhaut René-Charles-Joseph, Problèmes toxicologiques posés par l’emploi d’additifs et d’adjuvants dans les préparations pharmaceutiques, Paris, Société d’Editions Pharmaceutiques et Scientifiques, 1973
- Truhaut René-Charles-Joseph, Contribution à l’étude des facteurs chimiques de cancérisation, le problème des substances cancérigènes endogènes, Paris, Société d’édition d’enseignement supérieur, Thèse de pharmacie, Paris. Etat, 1947, N° 21
- Sous la dir. De René Truhaut, Pollution de l’air, comptes rendus du Colloque international de Royaumont, avril 1960, tenu sous l’égide du Comité Eurotox, comité européen permanent de recherches pour la protection des populations contre les risques d’intoxication à long terme, Paris, Sedes, 1961
- Truhaut René-Charles-Joseph, Chimie analytique appliquée, travaux pratiques de 4e année de la Faculté de pharmacie de Paris, Paris, Tournier et Constans, 1953
