= Ecotoxicology =

Study of toxic chemicals and its effect on the environment

Ecotoxicology is the study of how organisms, ecosystems, and populations are affected by toxic chemicals. This can occur at the population, community, ecosystem, and biosphere levels. This field is multidisciplinary and integrates toxicology and ecology. It examines how biological systems can be disrupted by pollutants such as pesticides and insecticides.

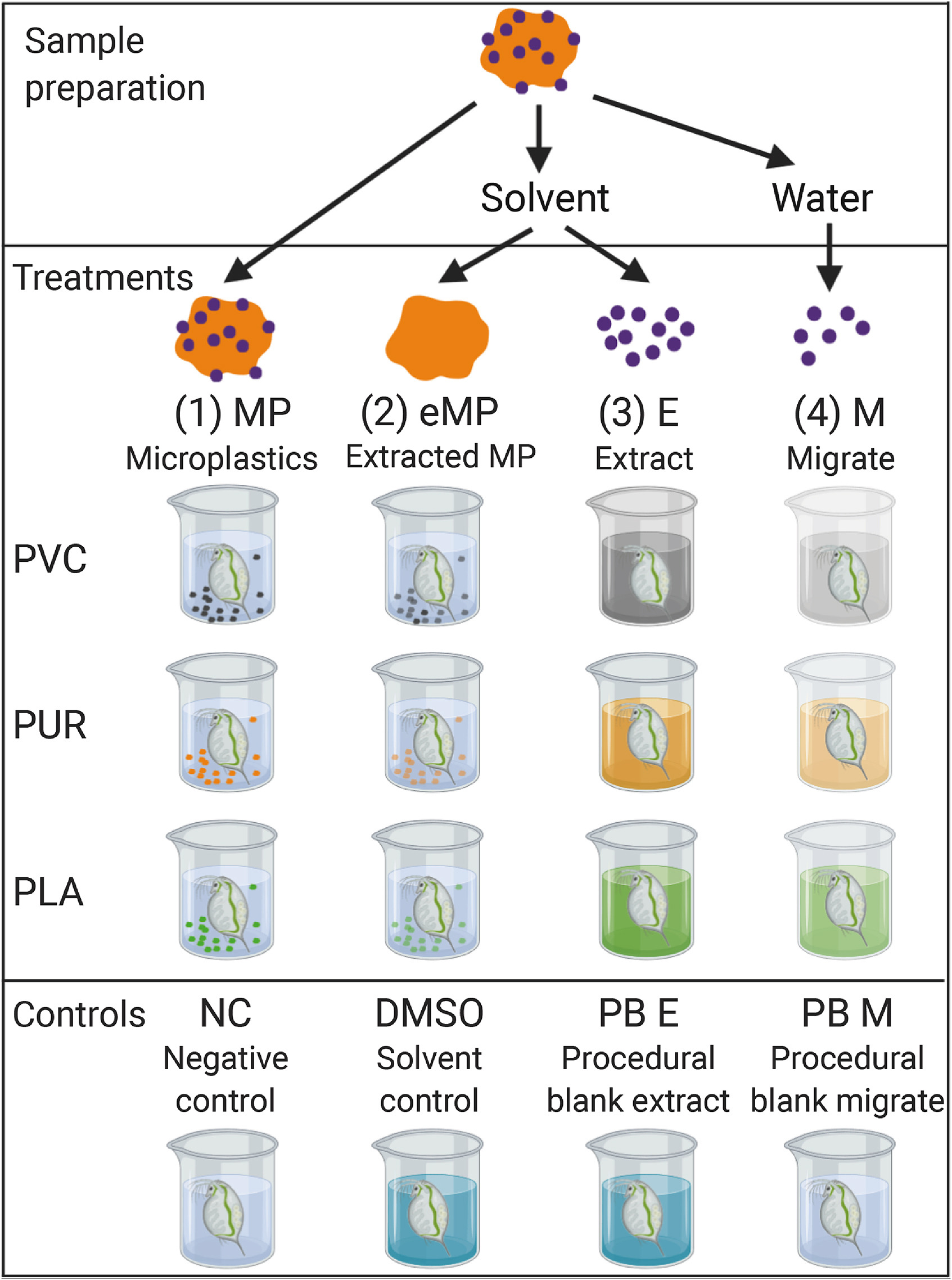
Ecotoxicity assay for microplastics in Daphnia magna

Ecotoxicology is used to understand and predict how pollution will affect environmental systems. This knowledge allows for environmental damage to be prevented or reduced. Where pollution has already affected an ecosystem, ecotoxicology studies can identify ways to restore ecosystem services, structures, and functions.

Ecotoxicology differs from environmental toxicology; it examines the effects of pollution across all biological levels, from molecular to entire ecosystems. Environmental toxicology, on the other hand, focuses specifically on how organisms are affected, specifically human health.

== History ==
Ecotoxicology is a relatively young discipline that made its debut in the 1970s. Its methodological aspects, derived from toxicology, are expanded to encompass the human environmental field and the biosphere at large. While conventional toxicology limits its investigations to the cellular, molecular, and organismal scales, ecotoxicology strives to assess the impact of chemical, physicochemical and biological stressors on populations and communities, as well as their effects on entire ecosystems. In this respect, ecotoxicology again takes into consideration dynamic balance under strain.

Ecotoxicology emerged after pollution events following World War II heightened awareness of the impact of toxic chemical and wastewater discharges on humans and the environment. The term "Ecotoxicology" was first introduced in 1969 by René Truhaut, a toxicologist, during an environmental conference in Stockholm. As a result, he was recognized as the originator of this discipline. In fact, the pioneering role of Jean-Michel Jouany, Truhaut's assistant, in conceptualizing the discipline and in defining its objectives, is now fully recognized. In Jouany's view, ecotoxicology is primarily linked to ecology as it seeks to understand the influence that stress factors can have on relationships existing between organisms and their habitat. Jean-Michel Jouany was appointed as a full professor at the University of Nancy in 1969. He then laid out the teaching and research principles for ecotoxicology at the University of Metz with his colleague, Jean-Marie Pelt, as early as 1971.

In France, two universities (Metz and Paris-Sud) significantly contributed to the expansion of this discipline during the 1980s and 1990s. Several institutes followed suit. Indeed, CEMAGREF (now IRSTEA), INERIS, IFREMER and CNRS created research units in ecotoxicology, as did other French universities (in Rouen, Bordeaux, Le Havre, Lyon, Lille, Caen...). During the 1990s, a new offshoot of ecotoxicology emerged known as Landscape ecotoxicology, which focuses on interactions between landscape ecological processes and environmental toxicants, particularly the species that had their migratory pathways disrupted.

== Common environmental toxicants ==
- PCBs (polychlorinated biphenyls) are found in coolant and insulating fluids, pesticide extenders, adhesives, and hydraulic fluids.
- Pesticides are widely used for preventing, destroying, or repelling organisms that are considered harmful. They are commonly found in commercially grown fruits, vegetables, and meats. Methyl parathion is a commonly used agricultural pesticide. Methyl parathion can create toxic conditions for humans, soil, water, freshwater fish, and other aquatic organisms. It can pose significant health risks.
- Mold and other mycotoxins are also common environmental toxicants.
- Phthalates are found in plastic wrap, plastic bottles, and plastic food storage containers, all of which make up a considerable part of household plastic waste.
- VOCs (volatile organic compounds), such as formaldehyde, can be found in drinking water and sewage systems.
- Dioxins are a class of chemical compounds that are formed as a result of combustion processes such as waste incineration and from burning fuels like wood, coal, and oil.
- Asbestos is found in the insulation of floors, ceilings, water pipes, and heating ducts.
- Heavy metals include arsenic, mercury, lead, aluminum, and cadmium, which are found in contaminated soil, water and food sources such as fish.
- Chloroform is used to make other chemicals.
- Chlorine is commonly found in household cleaners.

== Exposure to toxic chemicals ==
Organisms can be exposed to toxic chemicals through many different pathways; these include contaminated food, air, and water. Once these chemicals are introduced into an ecosystem, they begin to move through the food web, resulting in accumulation within the organisms over time. This process is known as biomagnification, in which toxins accumulate in organisms, which leads to higher trophic levels possessing a higher concentration. Due to this, the top predators are often the most affected by the toxic substances.

While contaminants do result in direct toxic effects, such as mortality, they can also produce indirect effects such as the alteration of organism behavior, their interactions within their ecosystems, and their reproduction. Nonlethal exposure to these pollutants can impair movement or reduce feeding rates; all of which can influence competition and predator-prey relationships. These disruptions can alter the balance in an ecosystem and lead to long-term changes in a community's biodiversity and structure.

There are many different ways toxic chemicals can enter organisms, such as ingestion, inhalation or skin absorption. Once these chemicals are inside, they can affect processes such as growth, metabolism, or reproduction. This can result in immediate effects (such as illness or death) or long-term effects (such as reduced reproduction or changes in behavior). These effects can impact entire populations and ecosystems. Studying these effects is important for understanding their environmental damage.

== Effects on individuals and entire population ==
- Direct effects – exposure to toxins through consumption, inhalation or ingestion of a contaminated substance.
- Indirect effects – organisms may be affected by the reduction of food availability due to toxin-related deaths in other species.
- Sublethal effects – toxins that do not cause immediate death, but can alter behavior and overall health.
- Increased sensitivity – organisms may become more sensitive to toxicants if there are additional environmental stressors
- Chronic exposure to pesticides has been associated with chromosomal abnormalities in humans and has been shown to adversely affect the reproductive, nervous, and cardiovascular systems in animal populations.
- Exposure to toxicants can affect genetic material by causing changes to DNA, which if not repaired, can lead to mutation.
- Contaminants can modify the distribution of individuals in a population, effective population size, mutation rate and migration rate.

== Effects of ecotoxicity on a community ==
- Predator-prey relationships – toxins can effect either the prey or the predators, which can lead to an imbalance in population sizes. A decline in prey can reduce predator populations since their food availability is now limited, while a decline in predator populations may result in an increase in prey populations.
- Community ecotoxicology examines how contaminants affect species abundance, diversity, community composition, and species interactions. Communities that rely heavily on competition and predation may have a difficult time responding to disturbances caused by contaminants. Species-rich communities are more likely to recover from contaminant disturbances than a less diverse one. Highly vulnerable species may be eliminated if exposed to toxic contaminants. Protecting community characteristics such as species richness and diversity is essential for maintaining a stable ecosystem.

== Overall effects ==
Chemicals are shown to prohibit the growth of seed germination of an arrangement of different plant species. Plants are what make up the most vital trophic level of the biomass pyramids, known as the primary producers. Because they are at the bottom of the pyramid, every other organism in an ecosystem relies on the health and abundance of the primary producers in order to survive. If plants are battling problems with diseases relating to exposure to chemicals, other organisms will either die because of starvation or obtain the disease by eating the plants or animals already infected. Ecotoxicology investigates the cumulative effects of chemical contaminants (from many sources) on biological systems at several levels. These compounds can act at several levels of biological organization, including molecules, cells, people, and populations, potentially changing the structure and function of entire ecosystems.

== Ways of prevention ==
Regulation:

- In the United States, the Environmental Protection Agency (EPA) reviews all pesticides before the products are registered for sale to ensure that the benefits will outweigh the risks.
- Food Quality Protection Act and the Safe Drinking Water Act were passed in 1996, which required EPA to screen pesticide chemical for potential to produce harmful effects.
- Packers close track of the labeling when using a fertilizer, or pesticide. Shoppers looking for products that will have less of an impact on the environment.
- There are many federal and state laws protecting birds, animals, and rare plants
- Proper waste disposal

== Ecotoxicity testing ==
- Acute and chronic toxicity tests are performed terrestrial and aquatic organisms including fish, invertebrates, avians, mammalians, non-target arthropods, earthworms and rodents.
- The Organization for Economic Cooperation and Development (OECD) test guideline has developed specific tests to test toxicity level in organisms. Ecotoxicological studies are generally performed in compliance with international guidelines, including EPA, OECD, EPPO, OPPTTS, SETAC, IOBC, and JMAFF.
- LC50 is the acute toxicity, the lethal concentration at which 50% of the test organism dies within the test-specified time. The test may start with eggs, embryos, or juveniles and last up to 96 hours.
- EC50 is the concentration that causes adverse effects in 50% of the test organisms (for a binary yes/no effect such as mortality or a specified sublethal effect) or causes a 50% (usually) reduction in a non-binary parameter such as growth.
- No observed effect concentration (NOEC) is the highest dose of stressor at which there is no statistically significant difference of effect (p<0.05) seen in the test organism.
- Endocrine Disruptor Screening Program (EDSP)
- Tier 1 screening battery
- Endangered species assessments.
- Persistent, Bioaccumulative, and Inherently Toxic (PBiT) assessments using the Quantitative Structure-Activity Relationships (QSARs) to categorize regulated substances.
- Bioaccumulation in fish using the Bioconcentration Factor (BCF) methods.

== Classification of ecotoxicity ==
Total amount of acute toxicity is directly related to the classification of toxicity.

< 1 part per million → Class I

1–10 parts per million → Class II

10–100 parts per million → Class III

== See also ==
- Aquatic toxicology
