= Environmental health policy =

Government actions to prevent environmental health risks

Environmental health policy is governmental action intended to prevent exposure to environmental hazards or to "eliminate the effects of exposure to environmental hazards".

Several environmental policy issues affect people's health, including policies that affect access to clean air and water, policies that ensure sanitation and hygiene, provide labels for safe use of chemicals, support workplace safety, a health-supportive built environment, and sustainable agriculture. Environmental dangers to health include climate change, air pollutants and water pollution, certain chemicals and biological agents, noise, radiation, unsafe workplaces, and poor agricultural practices, among many others.

Environmental health policy can be implemented at many levels of government, including at the municipal, state, and international levels. International environmental health policies involve the cooperation of several countries to implement mutual policy goals to address larger environmental health issues, such as pollution and climate change (i.e., Kyoto Protocol).

== Environmental factors ==
Increasing temperatures is one environmental factor that contributes to the health of the global community. Climate change is the long-term rising and/or dropping of temperatures and the deviation of weather patterns over time. As a result of climate change, the Canadian Arctic has increased in temperature by three or four degrees. As the warming of the Northern Arctic continues, snow and ice melt, and runoff enters bodies of water, increasing the amount of pathogens that enter the fresh water.

With increasing extreme weather trends, vector and water-borne diseases, as well as allergies become more prevalent. These infectious diseases and what spreads them (mosquitoes, tics, etc.) rely upon the environment to reproduce and survive. The spread of these diseases is severely affected by weather fluctuations.

air pollutants also has an influence on health, and has become a challenging issue over time as developing nations experience higher birth rates and lower death rates. An increased population in these regions requires more resources to sustain it. Air pollution comes in two forms: emission and transmission. These pollutants come from various sources, such as modes of transportation, the burning of fossil fuels, or naturally from the ground.

Rising sea levels also has a large effect on public health, and is caused by the melting of large glacier ice without refreezing. If the glacier icecaps start melting at a faster rate, sea levels will continue to rise. Additionally, when temperatures increase, water molecules expand and require more space. As sea levels rise the shoreline begins to expand and, in serious cases, displaces people causing them to become environmental refugeess. Rising sea levels also begin to affect valuable agricultural land used for food and other products. Sea levels are predicted to rise by 40 cm by the 2080s, which would put 200 million people at risk.

== Health risks ==
Health risks resulting from the environment are starting to affect people around the globe. It is estimated that increasing temperatures over the past 30 years has resulted in the deaths of 150,000 people each year. Europe in the summer of 2003 experienced higher than normal temperatures, resulting in approximately 22,000 to 45,000 deaths in the span of two weeks. This has been the worst effect of climate change in recent history. Increasing rates of extreme temperature are directly related to increased mortality. Some of the health risks that come with extreme temperatures are heat stress, cardiovascular failure, and hypothermia, etc.

Temperature also affects the malaria parasites that live in mosquitoes. Their ability to incubate is affected, as well as how likely the mosquitoes are to blood feed. Mosquitoes thrive in the transmission of parasites where temperatures do not exceed 25 degrees Celsius. Excessive rain, which is becoming more frequent amongst many countries, acts as the perfect breeding site for the aquatic beginning of a mosquito's life. Malaria is a vector-borne disease that is extremely prevalent in Africa, and puts billions of people at risk of contracting the virus. Due to a lack of sufficient healthcare where the disease is most concentrated, many people die. The environment is a huge contributor to the success malaria has in transmitting the disease.

One of the more common health risks that people encounter is a result of air pollutants and air quality. Allergic asthma is a chronic disease that affects an individual's inflammatory system when they are exposed to allergens, resulting in shortness of breath, wheezing, and coughing. Environmental factors such as air pollutants, tobacco smoke, emission fumes, and other allergens in the air are said to have an influence on allergic asthma when absorbed through the body.

Climate change can affect humans' respiratory health by aggravating respiratory disease or increasing exposure to potential risks of the disease. Climate change can affect the respiratory system by the amount of pollen and allergens in the air, mold proliferation, and the effects of the ozone layer. The increase of temperatures results in putting a strain on the respiratory system, often causing asthma and other lung diseases. Some of the health risks that are closely related to the respiratory system are asthma, rhinosinusitis, respiratory tract infections, and chronic obstructive pulmonary disease.

== Perspectives ==
=== Municipal level ===
==== Hamilton, Ontario (Canada) ====
The Hamilton steel mill region has had higher levels of air pollution than the rest of the city. The effect of air pollution in the region has resulted in the spending of $537 million per year on health care and other associated costs. Many health issues that arise with air pollution in Hamilton are premature death, respiratory problems, and cardiovascular problems. Hamilton is taking the initiative to spread awareness around environmental issues with the implementation of yearly summits. Vision 2020 is a community-based development program which encourages community reporting of environmental issues, influencing policy.

==== Rochester, New York (United States of America) ====
In 2005, the city of Rochester enacted a rental housing-based lead law when the incidence of childhood lead poisoning was rising. The new amendment to the housing code requires a lead inspection of rental properties built before 1978, with a focus on deteriorating paint within and outside the house. The law requires property owners to remove any lead based paint and dust from the premises and obtain a certificate of occupancy before they are able to rent out the property again. In order to keep compliance with the law, Rochester allows owners to be trained in lead safe repair work so Environmental Protection Agency workers are not required to correct violations.

==== Harlem, New York (United States of America) ====
Harlem, along with many areas of the United States, has taken on a community based participatory research method to examine environmental health policy. The West Harlem Environmental Action Inc. and Columbia University's Centre for Children's Environmental Health studied the effects of diesel pollution on the environment, and provided the results to the government, which transformed their environmental health policies to accommodate the results. Respiratory health was the main concern for the policy change, which was traced back to particular matter and carbon within local diesel sources. Harlem reconstructed their bus fleet system by using clean diesel and installation of permanent air monitors to control the amount of air pollution created by buses.

==== Sao Paulo, Brazil ====
The metropolitan area of São Paulo has dealt with issues of air and water pollution created by motor vehicles and inadequate treatment of sewage. Infectious and parasitic diseases, circulatory diseases, and respiratory problems have all been a concern in São Paulo. The city uses data linkages (HEADLAMP) between the environment and health in order to influence future policies. Air pollution has been improved marginally in regard to industrial pollution, but motor vehicle traffic creates the largest amount of sulphur dioxide emissions. Water treatment plants have not grown to accommodate the growing population, but piped water and sanitation facilities have been expanding. Impacts of the environment on health have been felt more in the poorer areas of the city compared to the wealthier sectors.

=== State level ===
==== Developed nations ====
===== Canada =====
Canada has dealt with lead exposure for decades, decreasing since the 1970s with the phasing out of lead paint and gasoline. While there has been a decrease in lead poisoning, there are still cases of exposure to lead from paint and old pipes in homes. Lead exposure is more harmful for pregnant women and children, making them more prone to poisoning. Lead was listed as a toxic substance under the Canadian Environmental Protection Act. The government implemented regulations against lead to foster a healthy environment.

The First Nations and Inuit Health Branch attempts to ensure that these communities are given equal access to health services comparable to those in similar locations of Canada. Health Canada defines a health environment to include safe water, food, maintained housing and facilities, disposal of waste, and the ability to prevent and control disease. The Environmental Public Health Program is implemented in several aboriginal communities, customized to specific needs including food security, clean water sources, and improving poor housing conditions.

===== United States =====
The United States has several policies to deal with chemical exposure, air quality, energy, oil pollution, and safe drinking water. Public exposure to chemicals can have effects on the body including cancer, cardiovascular disease, asthma and obesity. Those who work in industrial and agriculture sectors are more prone to exposure, but children, pregnant women, and those with chronic medical conditions are also at a higher risk of exposure. The United States has implemented the Toxic Substances Control Act to deal with chemical exposure and ensure chemicals are safe and citizens are minimally affected.

The EPA is developing clean diesel fuels and biodiesel to deal with air pollution caused by motor vehicle emissions. These types of emissions can affect respiratory health, the risk of cancer, and increased medical costs for the population. In 2013, transportation accounted for more than half of carbon monoxide and nitrogen oxides produced in the environment. The country has also implemented vehicle emission standards to cut pollution from motor vehicles.

===== Norway =====
Norway has several environmental regulations dealing with pollution, water and air quality. There are also policies in place to protect citizen's health and well-being in general, and in the workplace. Workplaces must ensure they have measures to prevent or contain pollution, along with voluntarily preparing environmental impact statements that are available to pollution control authority. If facilities produce carbon dioxide emissions, then they must apply for a discharge permit and report yearly emissions to pollution control authorities. Norway attempts to protect its water sources from contamination by ensuring facilities implement measures that cause the least amount of harm or inconvenience to the public or corporations. The government puts policies in place to ensure the safety of employee health at all levels, and takes action on any hazards within the workplace that would put health at risk.

===== Turkey =====
Air quality in Turkey is currently at levels that are considered harmful to human health. Lung capacity growth of children is diminished in areas of high air pollution, which can increase chances of lung disease. Risks to lung health include asthma, Chronic Obstructive Pulmonary Disease, lung cancer, and emphysema, which can be intensified by poor air quality. Coal power in Turkey has been a critical factor in air pollution. The power plants release sulfur dioxide, nitrogen oxides, and mercury, which can last in the environment for up to forty years. The Turkish Medical Association expressed concerns about increasing the number of coal plantss in Turkey, and suggested a phasing out of coal plants to increase air quality in the country to safe levels.

===== Germany =====
The Ministry of Environment and Ministry of Health have coordinated with agencies and scientific institutions to understand environmental health issues. Germany has had a long history of environmental health policies in order to maintain the well-being of citizens. Policies are based on scientific research and collaboration between ministries, but environmental health policies are often not on the policy agenda since they are relatively well controlled.

In 2011, policies were adopted to phase out nuclear energy in the country after the Fukushima nuclear disaster. Air pollution increased to the highest levels since the 1980s due to increased coal burning, putting the population at risk for chronic diseases associated with air pollution. Mining in the country had also resulted in water pollution that affects human and animal health. Coal mining has been linked to environmental and health issues, leading the government to close all mining pits by 2018. Germany has been a leading actor in dealing with carbon emissions related to climate change through policies to reduce use of resources and efficient use of renewable energy sources.

==== Developing nations ====
===== China =====
China has large-scale mineral resources and is one of the biggest producers and consumers of metals and metalloids. Since the 1980s, they have seen an increase in pollution and degradation of natural resources, putting the health of the population at risk. Air pollution is the biggest environmental cause of cardiopulmonary disease in the country. The Asian countries are looking to research environmental factors to better understand how they affect health.

China's mines have produced heavy metal polluted soils that pose a risk to human health. Those living around the area of the mines are especially at risk of the carcinogenic and non-carcinogenic risks of the soil. The main dangers come from sewage irrigation, sludge application, mining, and smelting operations. This pollution affects the human body by harming the nervous, skeletal, circulatory, enzymatic, endocrine, and immune system. More chronic effects can include cancer, bone fractures, hypertension, lesions, and neuropathy. China has conducted very few health risk assessment studies of all mines in the country, so full health risks associated with the mines are unknown.

===== India =====
In the mining communities of India, the population is at risk of respiratory illness and malaria. Those who live closer to the mines reported higher incidence of these illnesses. This has influenced environmental policy because mining is a profitable business that can be privatized, but with adverse effects on health they have been required to balance human and ecological health.

India has also seen difficulty providing access to drinking water and sanitation services in rural areas. Community demand-driven programmes have been implemented since 2004 which required improvements in water supply, sanitation, and hygiene. This was an effort to improve children's health and reduce diarrhea and water-related illnesses. Only 21% of the rural population was using a private tap, while the others commuted to obtain water. Only 12% used private toilets, while the others travelled to a main sanitation site. The implemented program was able to increase access to filtered water, private toilets, and increased hygiene.

===== Nigeria =====
In 2014, Nigeria implemented the WHO Country Cooperation Strategy to deal with Millennium Development Goals. A strategic objective of the policy was to assess health effects of environmental risks by conducting health impact assessments. The government also plans to increase countries abilities to deal with environmental emergencies including climate change, air pollution, and radiation that could be harmful to health. The strategy focuses on creating policies to improve medicine, universal access to health care, and reduction in diseases caused by the environment.

===== Kenya =====
In 2016, the Kenya government introduced the new Kenya Environmental Sanitation and Hygiene Policy. Poor sanitation has been a leading cause of mortality in the country. The new policy created a timeline from 2016 to 2030 in which guidelines were set for state and non-state actors to follow to improve sanitation and create a better quality of life. The aim is to have universal access to sanitation by 2030. This includes all public places and dwellings having access to sustainable toilets, free from odours, and reducing hygiene related diseases. Currently, about 72% of toilets in rural Kenya are dug pits, and open defecation occurs. The amount of sanitation sewers is very low, with most not being treated. Sewage bursts and discharge of raw sewage from plants is a common practice, contaminating the earth and water supply. Air pollution in urban centres is also a concern. In Nairobi, pollution levels are three times higher than World Health Organization recommendations. Urbanization is projected to increase in the next decade, so the government has created Kenya Vision 2030 in attempts to deal with sanitation practices in the country. Kenya Visions wants to make Kenya a newly industrialized, middle-income country with a high quality of life for its citizens.

=== International level ===
==== World Health Organization (WHO) ====
In 2006, the World Health Organization created a study on specific diseases and injuries affected by environmental risks, and which regions of the world are at the most risk of injury. WHO studies the effects and supports the design of preventative and health strategies in countries to reduce environmental health risks. Environmental factors such as air and water quality, patterns of energy use, and patterns of land use can directly and indirectly affect health of citizens. WHO's findings found that 24% of global disease and 23% of deaths are caused by environmental factors (although they vary from developing countries with 25%, and developed with 17%). Several diseases found in the study included diarrhea, respiratory infections, malaria, and unintentional injuries caused by environmental factors that can be modified by policy. Infectious diseases are a higher burden in developing countries than in developed, attributed to more exposure to environmental risks and a lack of access to health care. Diseases attributed to environmental factors decrease with development to either eradication, or to levels comparable to developed regions. Children are disproportionately affected by environmental hazards. WHO found that children under the age of five are more prone to diseases from environmental factors than the rest of the total population.

WHO has supported the United Nations' Millennium Development Goals to provide sustainable access to safe drinking water. The benefits to the MDG's are savings in health care, economic productivity, and fewer lives lost from diseases caused by contaminated water.

World Health Organisation (WHO) data reveals an estimation of 4 to 6.8 million individuals die due to air pollution each year. In addition, 8 of 10 people breathe air with increased pollutant levels.

==== United Nations ====
In 2000, the Millennium Development Goals (MDG) were created at the UN Millennium Declaration. Leaders from all over the world gathered in aims to reduce poverty by 2015 in developing countries. Eight goals were created in order to deal with extreme poverty due to climate, shelter, and disease, and ensure everyone has the right to health, education, shelter, and security.

Adopted in 2015, Sustainable Development Goals (SDG) to be reached by 2030 were created to replace the MDG. These goals are aimed at both developing and developed countries, using environmental, social, and economic dimensions to meet goals. Goals 3, 6, and 11 affect environmental health policy. Goal 3 is to ensure Good Health and Well-being, which affects other goals. If environmental goals are achieved, the health of the country will be able to improve by reducing disease and death. Goal 11 of creating sustainable cities and communities is important to environmental health policy since urbanization is a big concern that can affect resources including water, which affects the health of the population. Goal 6 aims to provide clean water and sanitation in countries. Wastewater treatment in countries is an issue that the SDG goals are trying to influence countries to improve and provide better access to clean drinking water and sanitation.
