= American Conference of Governmental Industrial Hygienists =

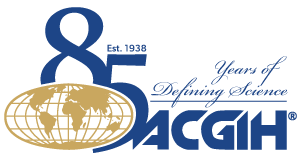
- Abbreviation: ACGIH
- Formation: June 27, 1938; 87 years ago
- Type: A 501(c)(3) charitable scientific organization
- Headquarters: Cincinnati, OH
- Executive Director: Phillip Rauscher MPH, CIH, CSP
- Website: https://www.acgih.org/

The American Conference of Governmental Industrial Hygienists (ACGIH) is a professional association of industrial hygienists and practitioners of related professions, with headquarters in Cincinnati, Ohio. One of its goals is to advance worker protection by providing timely, objective, scientific information to occupational and environmental health professionals.

== History ==
The National Conference of Governmental Industrial Hygienists (NCGIH) convened on June 27, 1938, in Washington, D.C. NCGIH's original constitution limited full membership to two representatives from each governmental industrial hygiene agency. Associate membership was made available to other professional personnel of the agencies holding full memberships, and also to personnel of educational institutions engaged in teaching industrial hygiene. Governmental industrial hygiene personnel of other countries were eligible for affiliated membership.

The Conference came into being with 59 members, one affiliated member, and 16 associate members. Forty-three members, one associate and six guests, attended the initial Conference. All but five of the members were from health departments. The New York and Massachusetts state labor departments each had two present, and one from the West Virginia state compensation commission.

At the end of World War II, many individuals were leaving governmental employment and membership in the Conference declined from the peak of 281 in 1944 to 235 in 1946. Changes due to the transition to a peacetime economy, the development of other professional associations, and changes in the technical and administrative needs of state and local agencies, required the Conference to revise its constitution and make some major changes in its organizational structure.

The 1946 constitution revisions abandoned the concept of limiting full membership to only two individuals from each governmental industrial hygiene agency. This opened the doors to all of their professional personnel to participate in the activities of the organization on an equal basis. Governmental industrial hygiene personnel from foreign countries were also given the right to full membership. These changes, among others, were to have a salutary effect on the organization which, in 1946, changed its name to the American Conference of Governmental Industrial Hygienists (ACGIH).

In the mid-1950s, steady growth in membership resumed and by 1960 there were 511 members, including 54 from other countries. During the next decade these numbers more than doubled and in 1977 the total reached 1,800, of which 166 were from outside the United States.

For over 75 years, ACGIH has been dedicated to the industrial hygiene and occupational and environmental health and safety communities. They have grown and expanded without losing sight of their original goal - to encourage the interchange of experience among industrial hygiene workers and to collect and make accessible such information and data as might be of aid to them in the proper fulfillment of their duties. This original goal is reflected in both their current mission - the advancement of occupational and environmental health - and in their tagline: Defining the Science of Occupational and Environmental Health.

As of 2016, nine ACGIH committees focus their energies on a range of topics: agricultural safety and health, air sampling instruments, bioaerosols, biological exposure indices, industrial ventilation, international, small business, chemical substance TLVs, and physical agent TLVs.

== Publications ==
The Applied Occupational and Environmental Hygiene journal, was published from 1990 through 2003 and was formerly published as Applied Industrial Hygiene from 1986 through 1989. This ACGIH peer-reviewed journal provided scientific information and data to members until ACGIH and AIHA began publishing a joint journal.

The Journal of Occupational and Environmental Hygiene (JOEH) is a joint publication of the American Industrial Hygiene Association (AIHA) and ACGIH. JOEH is a peer-reviewed journal devoted to enhancing the knowledge and practice of occupational and environmental hygiene and safety by widely disseminating research articles and applied studies of the highest quality.

Published monthly, JOEH provides a written medium for the communication of ideas, methods, processes, and research in the areas of occupational, industrial, and environmental hygiene; exposure assessment; engineering controls; occupational and environmental epidemiology, medicine and toxicology; ergonomics; and other related disciplines.

== Committees ==
The activities of each Committee are directed by an individual mission statement.

Agricultural Safety & Health Committee

Mission - To promote those activities and programs necessary to our suited for agriculture or agro-business and to increase awareness of occupational health, safety, and environmental issues affecting this underserved population worldwide.

Air Sampling Instruments Committee

Mission - To report on the availability, efficiency, use, and limitations of existing and new sampling methodology and instrumentation.

Bioaerosols Committee

Mission - To compile and disseminate information on biologically derived contaminants that may become airborne, to develop recommendations for assessment, control, remediation, and prevention of such hazards, and to establish criteria for bioaerosol exposure limits.

Biological Exposure Indices Committee

Mission - To develop occupational biological exposure guidelines that are scientifically valid and supported by professional judgment, up-to-date, well-documented, understandable, clear, and produced by a clearly defined process that is balanced and free of conflict of interest.

Industrial Ventilation

Mission - To provide a safe and healthful environment by integrating state-of-the-art information from government and industry sources, using them to develop and recommend ventilation and other engineering controls to capture, collect, filter, and remove airborne contaminants from the workplace.

International Committee

Mission - To help develop and support ACGIH's international initiatives.

Small Business Committee

Mission - To develop and disseminate practical information that operators of small businesses and their employees can apply to the recognition, evaluation, and control of workplace hazards and to assist education safety and health professionals in working with small business concerns.

Threshold Limit Values for Chemicals Substances Committee

Mission - To recommend airborne concentrations of agents and exposure conditions for use in the practice of industrial hygiene and by other qualified professionals to protect worker health.

Threshold Limit Values for Physical Agents Committee

Mission - To develop and disseminate occupational exposure guidelines that are evidence-based, scientifically valid, and rigorously review.

== TLVs and BEIs ==
ACGIH establishes the Threshold Limit Values (TLVs) for chemical substances, physical agents, and Biological Exposure Indices (BEIs); which refer to the airborne concentrations of chemical substances that workers can be safely exposed to over their working lifetime. They are divided into four categories: time-weighted average (TWA), short-term exposure limit (STEL), surface limit (SL), and ceiling (C).

The Threshold Limit Values for Chemical Substances (TLV-CS) Committee was established in 1941. This group was charged with investigating, recommending, and annually reviewing exposure limits for chemical substances. It became a standing committee in 1944. Two years later, the organization adopted its first list of 148 exposure limits, then referred to as Maximum Allowable Concentrations. The term "Threshold Limit Values (TLV) was introduced in 1956. The first list of Threshold Limit Values and Biological Exposure Indices (the TLVs and BEIs book) was published in 1962. A new edition is now published annually. Today's list of TLVs and BEIs includes over 600 chemical substances and physical agents, as well as over 30 Biological Exposure Indices for selected chemicals.

The TLVs and BEIs are developed as guidelines to assist in the control of health hazards. These recommendations or guidelines are intended for use in the practice of industrial hygiene, to be interpreted and applied only by a person trained in this discipline. While not enforceable like OSHA's "permissible limit exposures", TLVs and BEIs are still significant and act as advisory numbers to OSHA and to manufacturers who care about workplace safety.

In certain circumstances, individuals or organizations may wish to make use of these recommendations or guidelines if the use of TLVs and BEIs contributes to the overall improvement in worker protection.

== Foundation for Occupational Health & Safety ==
The Foundation for Occupational Health & Safety (FOHS) is an ACGIH supported nonprofit that promotes workplace and worker well-being worldwide through professional education, scientific research in the field and on the profession itself, and the creation of the Sustainable TLV/BEI Fund.

In 2003, the YIHWAG Family Foundation awarded FOHS a substantial grant to benefit the needs of educational organizations in developing countries throughout the world. From this grant, FOHS established the Worldwide Outreach Program. Its mission is to support the professional development of occupational health and safety throughout the world. Qualifying educational organizations, professional organizations, and non-government organizations seeking to further the goals of the World Health Organization Collaborating Centers for Occupational Health’s 2006-2010 Work Plan can apply for program grants ranging from $1,000 - $2,000.

In 2008, FOHS created the Sustainable TLV/BEI Fund. The core purpose of the fund is to develop sustainable financial support to ensure the continued existence of ACGIH® TLVs and BEIs. Since its inception the core purpose and ‘cause’ of ACGIH has been to protect workplace employees through the development of science-based occupational exposure guidelines widely known as the TLVs and BEIs. These guidelines have become recognized throughout the world as forming the scientific basis for subsequent development of workplace standards.
