= GP5 =

GP5 could refer to several things:

- GP5 (gene)
- T7 phage, or Gp5
- GP5 chip, computer chip
- GP-5 gas mask, Soviet civilian gas mask
