= John Priestley =

John Priestley may refer to:

- John Priestley (footballer), Scottish footballer
- John Gillies Priestley, British physiologist
- J. B. Priestley (John Boynton Priestley), English writer
- Jack Priestley (John S. Priestley), American cinematographer
