= GP-7 =

GP-7 or GP7 may refer to:

== Vehicular ==
- EMD GP7, a class of locomotives
- Ducati GP7, a model of the racing motorcycle Ducati Desmosedici
- Honda GP7, a model of the subcompact Honda Fit Shuttle

== Other uses ==
- (48616) 1995 GP7, a minor planet
- GP-7 gas mask, a soviet civilian gas mask

== See also ==
- GP (disambiguation)
