= GP-4u =

Soviet-made gas mask

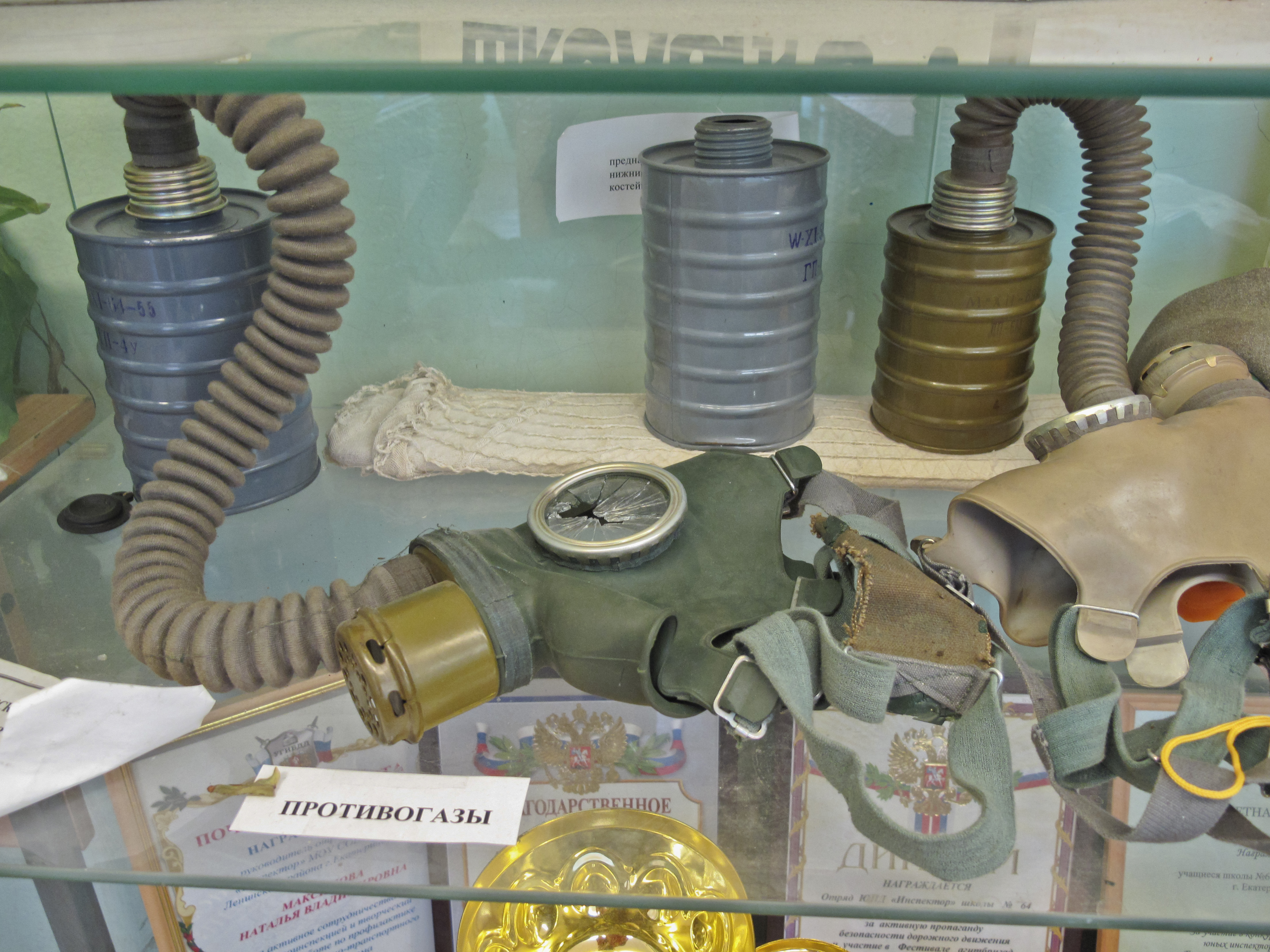
The GP-4u gas mask in the Yekaterinburg school.

The GP-4u (Russian: Гражда́нский Противога́з-4у, Grazhdanskii Protivogaz-4u) gas mask launched in year 1955, it was one of the most widely mass produced gas masks in the USSR at the time.

The civilian GP-4u gas mask consists of the facepiece, the hose and a cylinder-shaped filter, which is screwed onto the end of the hose. As the wearer breathes in air, the filter removes certain poisonous materials including toxins and microorganisms.

The facepiece of the mask consists of rubber that comes in three colors: black, white and green, the green being the most common color found on GP-4u gas masks, as well as two round glass lenses attached to the face-piece via metal. On the bottom side of the gas mask is the inhale-valve (on the front) which is where the hose starts, and an exhale valve behind it. The facepiece filters air and protects the wearer's lungs, eyes, and facial features from external contaminants.

The hose is permanently attached to the inhale valve at one end and connects to the filter at the other. Its sole function is to safely transport filtered air to the inhale valve for inhalation.

The filters made for the GP-4u are known to contain asbestos and are long expired as well as outdated. They are not recommended for use by anybody as they can pose significant health risks.

== Design ==
The gas mask filter is used for purifying the inhaled air from poisonous and radioactive substances, as well as pathogenic microbes and toxins. The "coffee-can" style filter has a GOST thread for attaching the filter to the inhale valve of the gas mask.

The face piece of the gas mask consists of a latex hood with a goggle assembly, a valve housing and a filter hose.

The mask was produced in five total sizes: three for adults and two for children aged 13 and younger. The valve house serves to distribute the flow of inhaled air and dispose of the exhaled air. In the lower part of the valve chamber there is a removable screen with holes, designed to protect the valve from mechanical damage during use and from falling out. The connected hose is used to connect the gas mask to the filter.

The upper end of the hose is tightly fixed on the branch pipe of the valve housing. The connecting hose is made of rubber covered with knitted fabric and has transverse corrugations, which give it necessary elasticity and flexibility when bending. The mask is applied to the head with a back piece and strapping system consisting of two non-stretchable frontal, four temporal and two occipital rubber straps ensuring an airtight fit to the face. The tension of the straps is adjusted by the movable buckles on the frontal straps and the fixed buckles on the occipital straps. The mask's bag is used to store and carry the mask and its accompanying equipment. In the case of a chemical weapon attack the bag can act as a pre-filter to remove particles of radioactive dust from the air entering the mask. The bag has two compartments: one for the filter, and one for the mask and wax paper cutouts used to protect the glasses from permanently fogging over in storage. At the bottom of the bag, in the compartment for the filter, there are two wooden slats that facilitate air access to the gas mask box. The bag closes with a flap and fastens with a button or strap. To carry the gas mask over the shoulder, a shoulder strap with a movable buckle is sewn onto the bag. A cloth band or cord and a metal half-ring or cloth eyelet are sewn onto the ribs of the bag facing the torso when carrying the gas mask, designed to secure the bag to the torso when carrying the gas mask in the "ready" and "ready-to-wear" positions.

== Equipment ==
The set of civil gas mask GP-4U includes:

- Front part - 1 piece
- Filtering and absorbing box - 1 piece
- Gas mask bag - 1 piece
- An anti-fogging agent for glasses of the spectacle assembly ("pencil") - 1 piece
- Instructions for use - 1 piece per packing place
- Certificate of standard quality - 1 piece per batch

== Additional information ==
The GP-4 provides protection against ammonia and its derivatives, organic vapors and gases with a boiling point of less than +65 °C such as: methane, ethane, acetylene, ethylene oxide, carbon monoxide and nitrogen oxides.

In the mid-50s of the 20th century, the GP-4U was discontinued in favor of the more modern, easier and cheaper to produce GP-5, although the production of GP-4U continued until 1974.
