= John Gillies Priestley =

British physiologist (1879–1941)

John Gillies Priestley (10 December 1879 – 9 February 1941) was a British physiologist known for his work on gases and human respiration. Along with Haldane, he established the role of carbon dioxide concentration in the regulation of breathing.

== Background ==
Priestly was born in Bingley, Yorkshire to Ann Ford and Charles Henry. He was educated at Eton and Christ Church, Oxford and qualified in medicine at St. Bartholomew's Hospital. He spent some time working with Wilhelm Falta in Vienna before returning to join as a director of the chemical pathology laboratory at St. Bartholomew's. Affected by tuberculosis in 1912 he moved to Oxford and served in the Royal Army Medical Corps during World War I. He then returned to teach clinical physiology at Oxford. It was here that he worked with John Scott Haldane on respiration and the concentration of carbon dioxide in the inspired air. He also examined the functioning of kidneys in water excretion. Priestly also compiled and edited the Physiological Abstracts and produced an index to the first sixty volumes of the Journal of Physiology.
