= PMK gas mask =

Line of Soviet gas masks

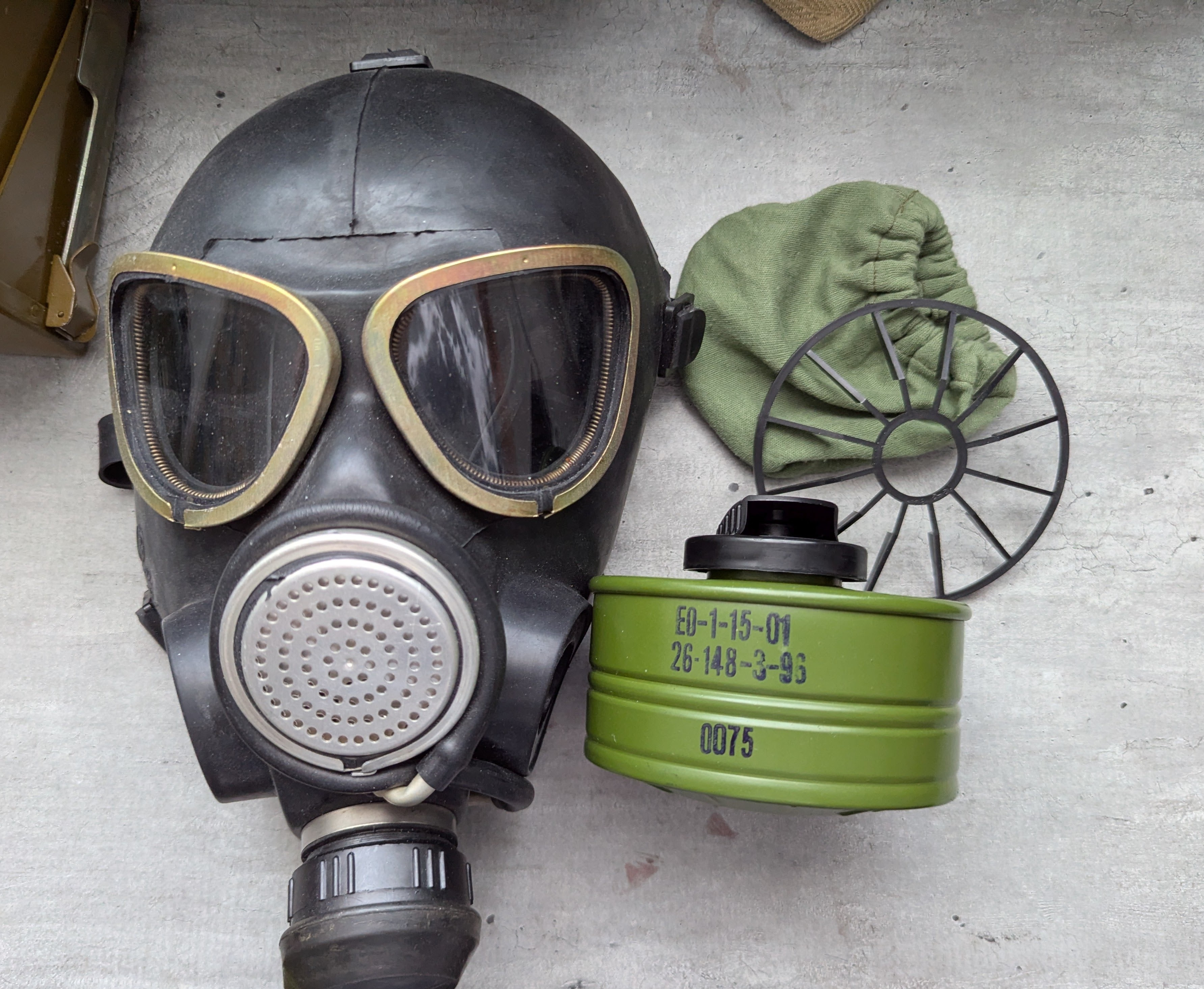
PMK-2

The PMK gas mask represents a family of gas masks used by the Soviet Armed Forces, and later by the Armed Forces of the Russian Federation. The MB-1-80 mask and the EO-1-15-01 filter are used.

== Filtering ==
The original PMK mounted the filter on only the left side of the mask. However, the filter could be mounted on both sides on the PMK-2 and later models. The filters themselves are designed to filter out toxic gases or radioactive vapors or aerosols, as well as biological agents. Although the filters are similar to and have the same 40 mm GOST threads as the GP-5 gas mask, they are a slightly different design, having a sloping top with ridges stamped into the metal.

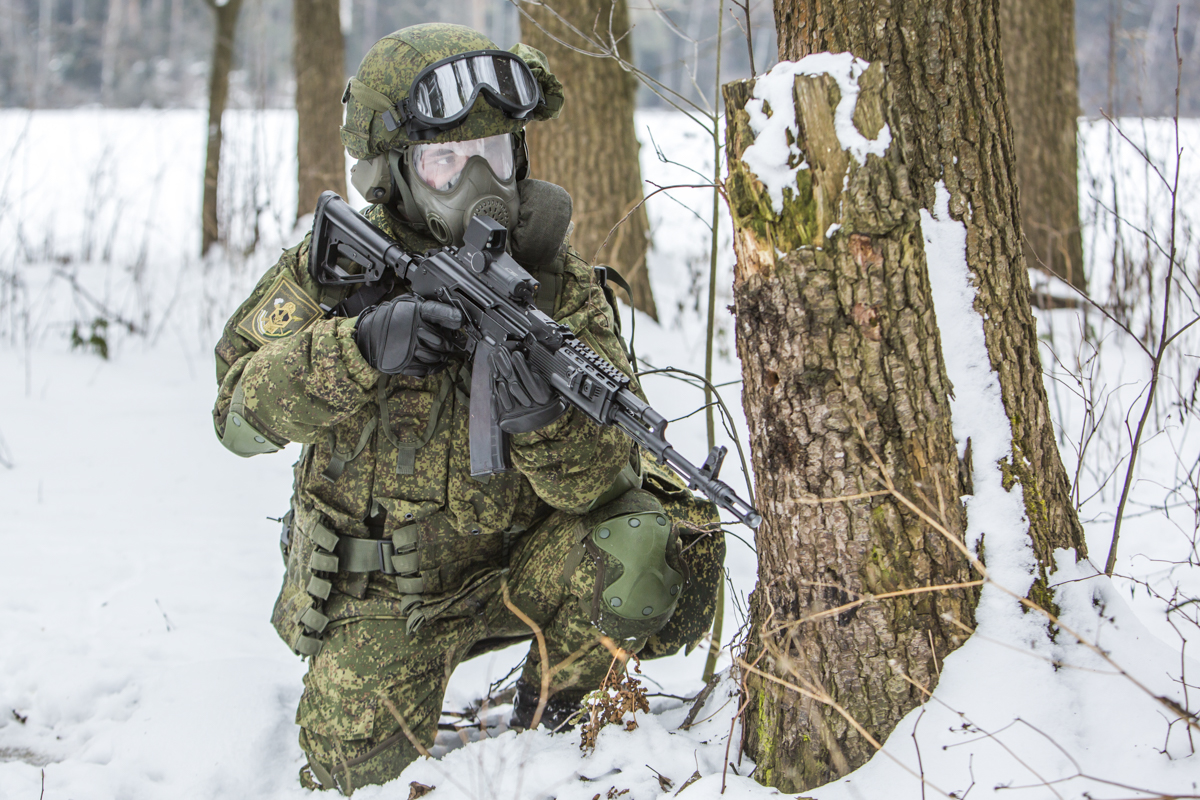
A Russian Infantryman wearing the latest PMK-4 gas mask.

== Drinking system ==
The PMK gas mask contains a drinking tube, allowing soldiers wearing the mask to rehydrate without removing the mask itself. The system consists of a special canteen cap, which will only allow water to flow through when connected to the tube leading to the mask. This system is compatible with standard type M drinking systems.

== Appearance ==
Early versions of the PMK have a trim around the lenses and over the voice diaphragm painted black. Later versions have the metal components of the mask left unpainted. The PMK's rubber is exclusively black coloured.
