= Robert Haldane Makgill =

Robert Haldane Makgill, CBE (24 May 1870 – 3 October 1946) was a New Zealand surgeon, pathologist, military leader and public health administrator.

== Early life ==
Makgill was born in Stirling, Stirlingshire, Scotland on 24 May 1870, emigrating to New Zealand with his family in 1881. He attended school in Auckland and went on to study medicine at the University of Edinburgh, graduating MB, CM in 1893 with first-class honours. His uncles were Lord Haldane and the Scottish physician and physiologist John Scott Haldane.

== Career ==
He was resident surgeon at Auckland Hospital in New Zealand from 1894 to 1896. He went back to Edinburgh to gain his MD in 1899, and completed the diploma in public health from Cambridge University in 1901. From 1901 to 1904 he was the district officer of health in Auckland, followed by appointment as government bacteriologist from 1904 to 1908, government pathologist 1908 to 1914, and Auckland's district health officer from 1909.

After an outbreak of bubonic plague in Auckland in 1902 he produced a detailed analysis of the pathology and public health problems in the city and surrounding districts. Similarly in a typhoid outbreak in Auckland in 1914 he undertook rigorous testing and quarantine and traced the outbreak to a temporary army camp on One Tree Hill. During World War 1 he served in the Royal Army Medical Corps and in the Egyptian Expeditionary Force, returning in 1916 to a public health position reporting on outbreaks of pneumonia and meningitis in military camps in Trentham, Upper Hutt and Featherston.

Makgill took charge of the public health management of the 1918 influenza epidemic. After the epidemic he appeared before the Epidemic Commission. He was particularly interested in health legislation. One outcome of his work was the creation of the 1920 Public Health Act which consolidated and simplified existing legislation, and clarified the responsibilities and relationship of the Department of Health with the hospital boards. He was also responsible for drafting other public health legislation in the 1920s such as the 1926 Nurses' and Midwives' Registration Act.

He died in Auckland on 3 October 1946.

== Honours ==
Makgill was awarded the C.B.E. in 1919 in recognition of his military services in the Second Boer War and World War 1.
