= Gas mask =

Protection from inhaling airborne pollutants and toxic gases

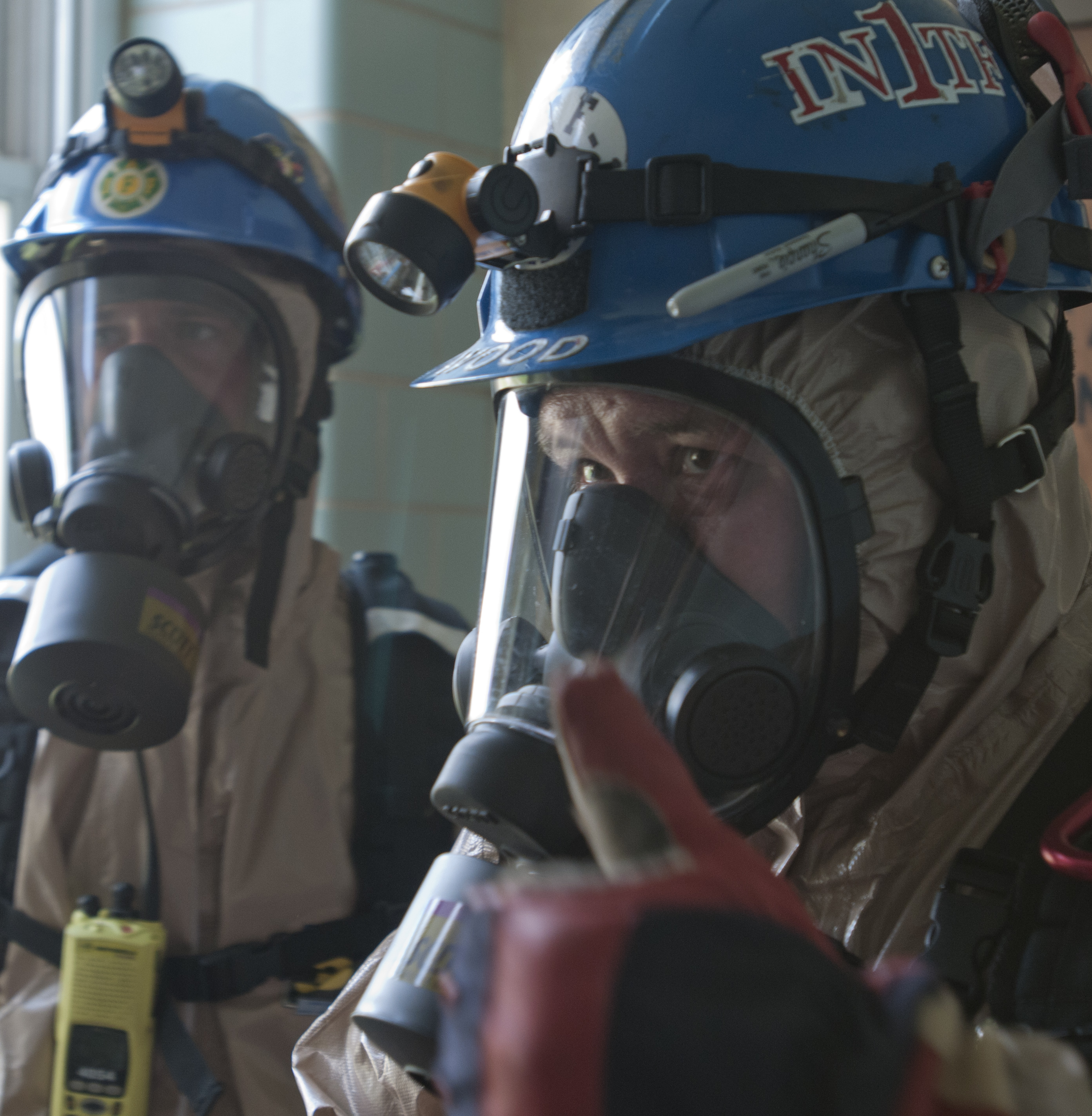
- Two people wearing full-face elastomeric respirators with gas mask canisters
- Other name(s): gas helmet, gasmask, gas mask canister
- Regulated by: American National Standards Institute
- Regulation: 42 CFR 84, ANSI Z88.7-2001, EN 14387
- NIOSH schedule: TC-14G (canister only)
- [edit on Wikidata]

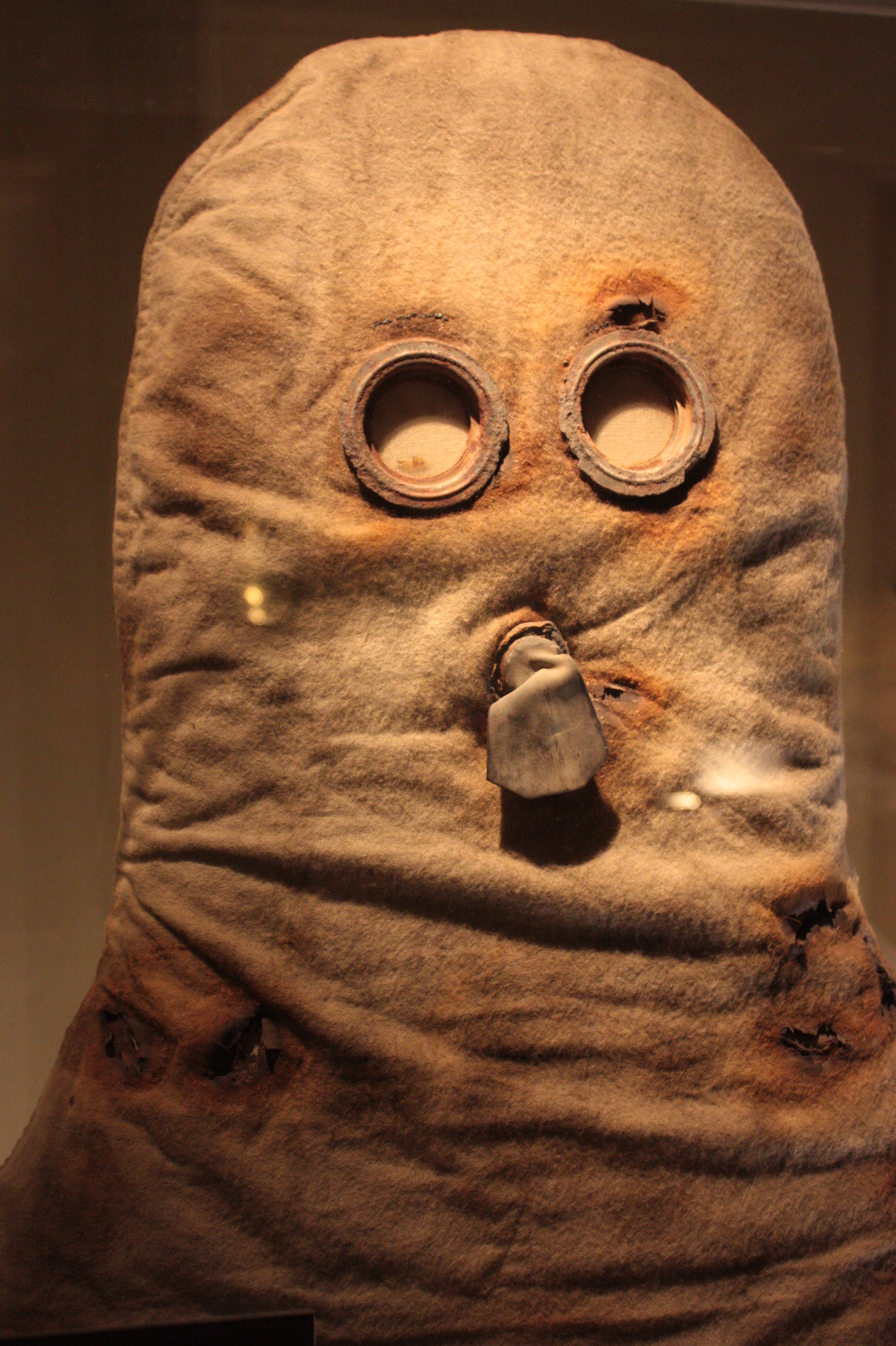
A World War I British P Helmet, c. 1915

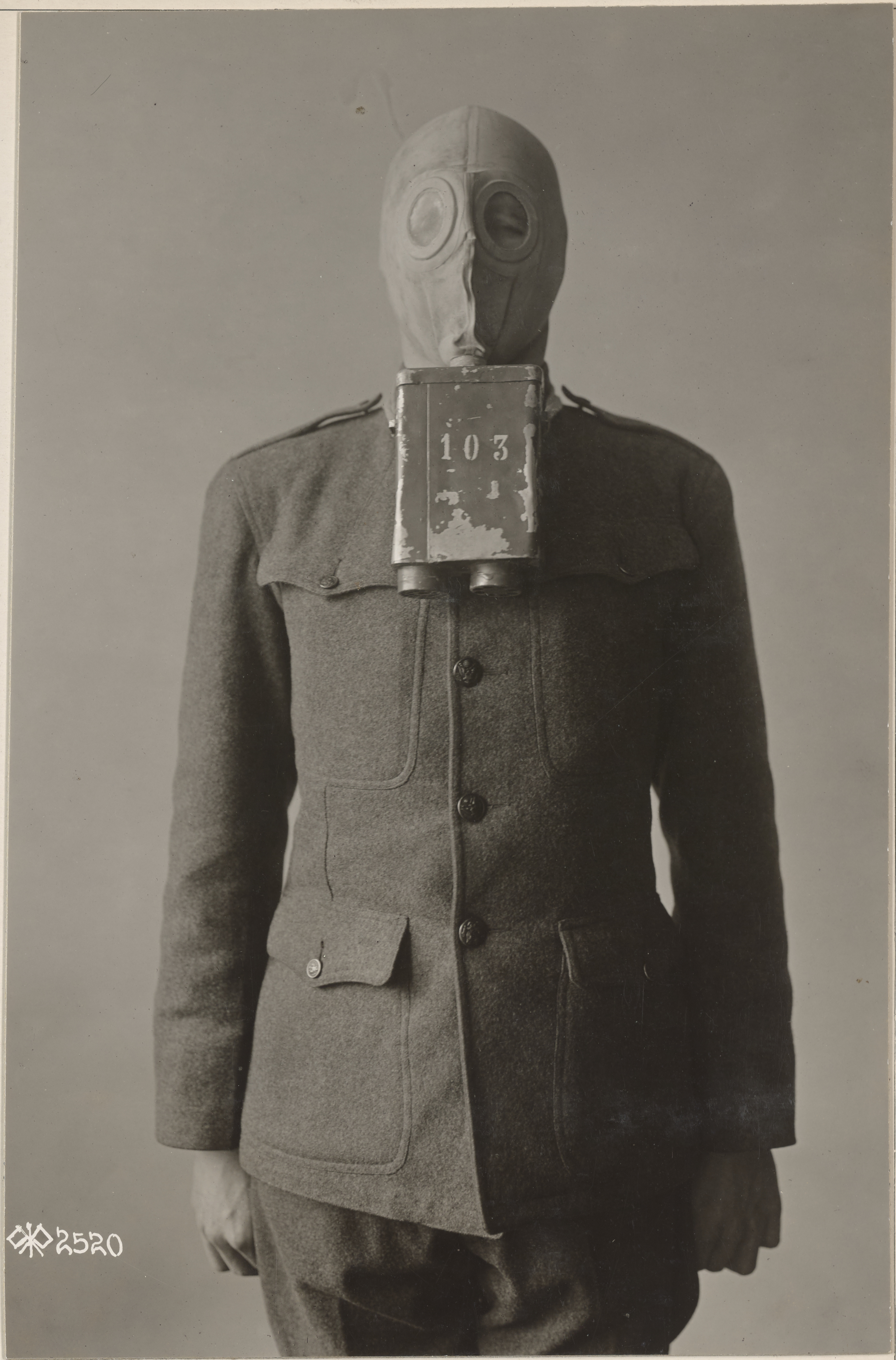
Zelinsky–Kummant protivogaz, designed in 1915, was one of the first modern-type full-head protection gas masks with a detachable filter and eyelet glasses, shown here worn by U.S. Army soldier (USAWC photo)

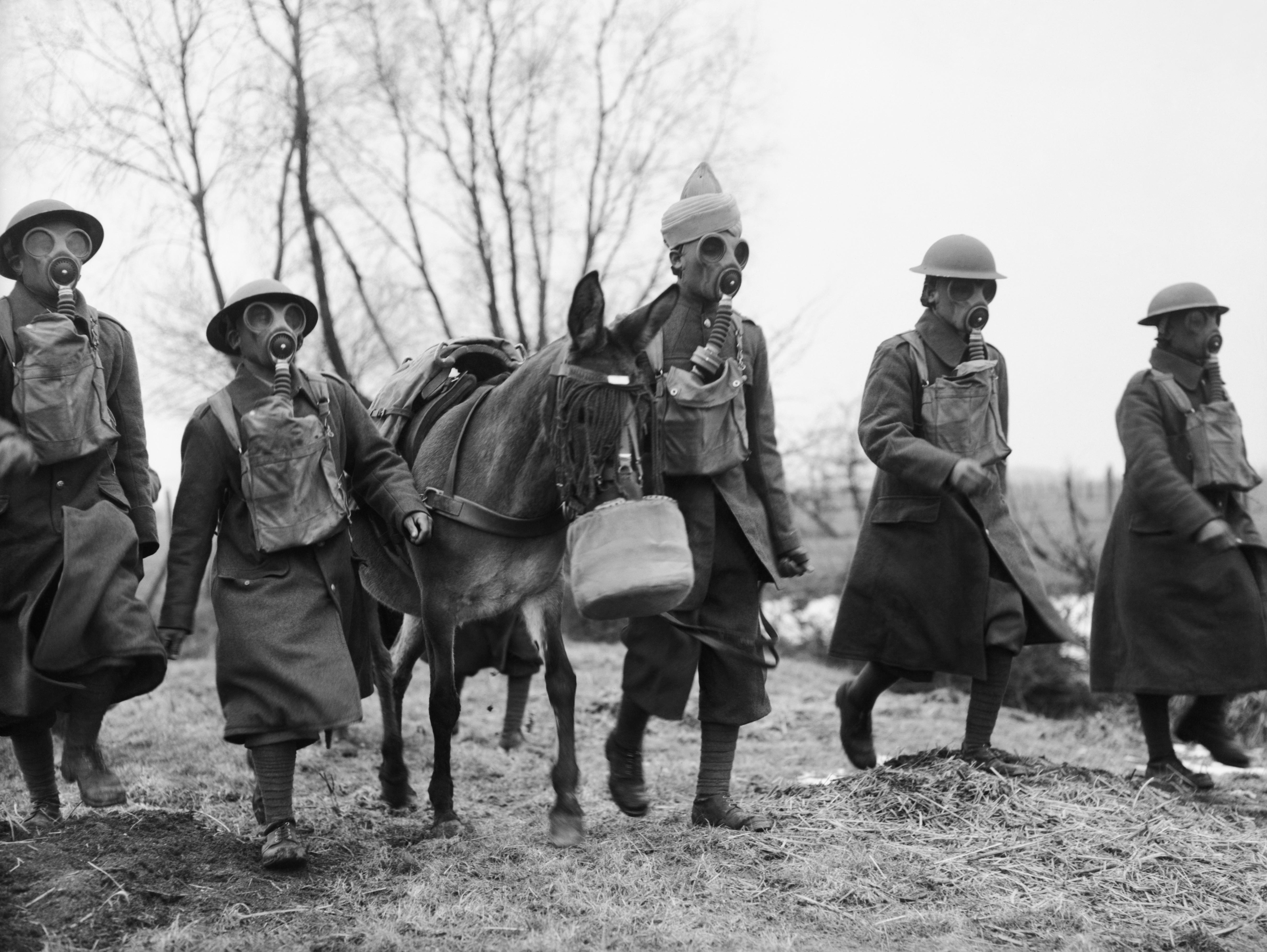
Indian muleteers and mule wearing gas masks, France, February 21, 1940

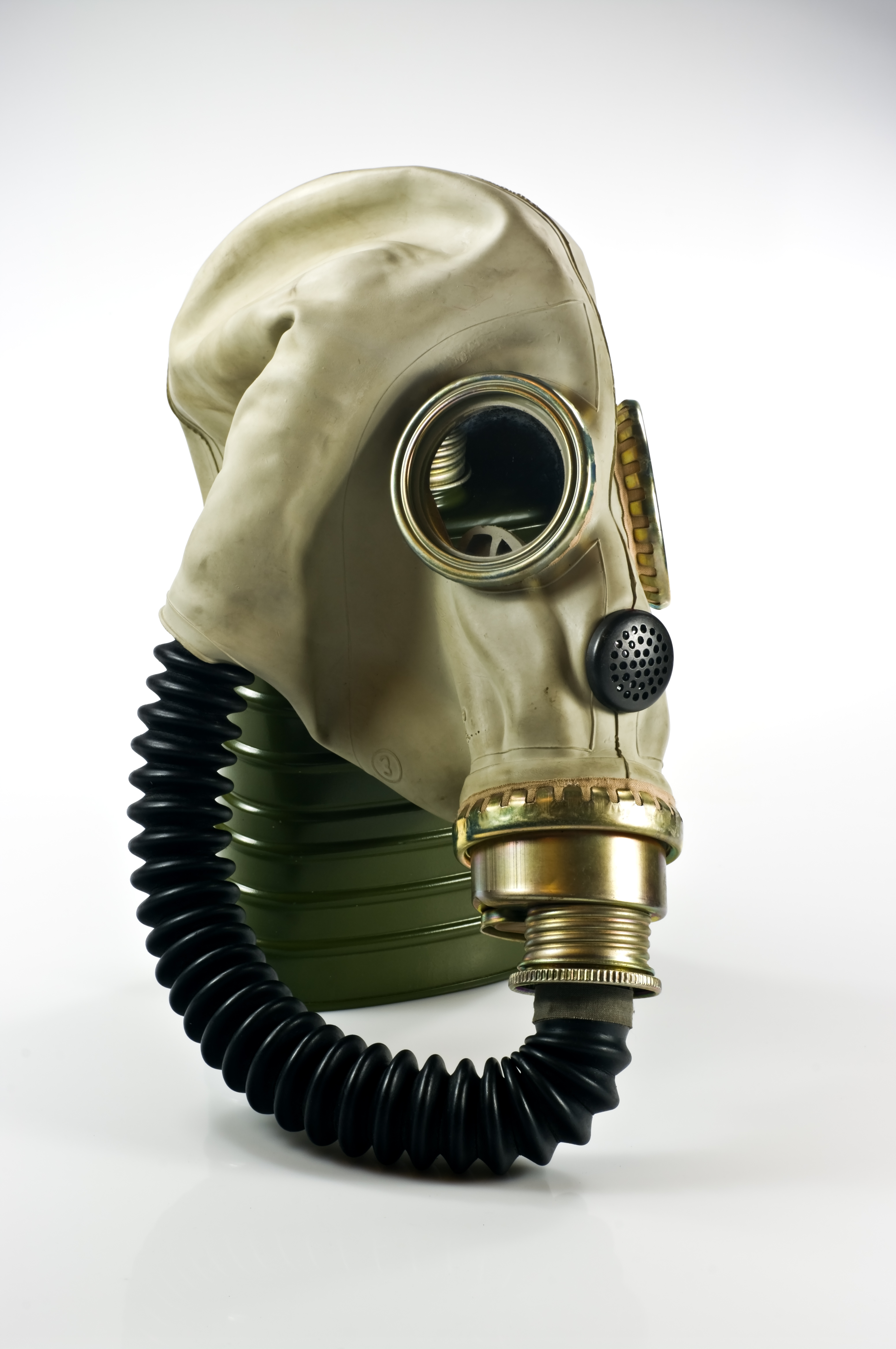
A 2nd generation Polish SzM-41M KF gas mask, used from 1969 through to the mid-1980s

A gas mask is a piece of personal protective equipment used to protect the wearer from inhaling airborne pollutants and toxic gases. The mask forms a sealed cover over the nose and mouth, but may also cover the eyes and other vulnerable soft tissues of the face. Most gas masks are also respirators, though the word gas mask is often used to refer to military equipment (such as a field protective mask), the scope used in this article. Gas masks only protect the user from ingesting or inhaling chemical agents, as well as preventing contact with the user's eyes (many chemical agents affect through eye contact). Most combined gas mask filters will last around 8 hours in a biological or chemical situation. Filters against specific chemical agents can last up to 20 hours.

Airborne toxic materials may be gaseous (for example, chlorine or mustard gas), or particulates (such as biological agents). Many filters provide protection from both types.

Modern gas masks developed during World War I featured circular lenses made of glass, mica or cellulose acetate to allow vision. Glass and mica were quite brittle and needed frequent replacement. The later Triplex lens style (a cellulose acetate lens sandwiched between glass ones) became more popular, and alongside plain cellulose acetate they became the standard into the 1930s. Panoramic lenses were not popular until the 1930s. Later, stronger polycarbonate came into use.

Some masks have one or two compact air filter containers screwed onto inlets, while others have a large air filtration container connected to the gas mask via a hose that is sometimes confused with an air-supplied respirator in which an alternate supply of fresh air (oxygen tanks) is delivered.

== History and development ==
=== Early breathing devices ===
According to Popular Mechanics, "The common sponge was used in ancient Greece as a gas mask..." In 1785, Jean-François Pilâtre de Rozier invented a respirator.

Primitive respirator examples were used by miners and introduced by Alexander von Humboldt in 1799, when he worked as a mining engineer in Prussia. The forerunner to the modern gas mask was invented in 1847 by Lewis P. Haslett, a device that contained elements that allowed breathing through a nose and mouthpiece, inhalation of air through a bulb-shaped filter, and a vent to exhale air back into the atmosphere. First Facts states that a "gas mask resembling the modern type" was patented by Lewis Phectic Haslett of Louisville, Kentucky, who received a patent on June 12, 1849. U.S. patent #6,529 issued to Haslett, described the first "Inhaler or Lung Protector" that filtered dust from the air.

Early versions were constructed by the Scottish chemist John Stenhouse in 1854 and the physicist John Tyndall in the 1870s. Another early design was the "Safety Hood and Smoke Protector" invented by Garrett Morgan in 1912, and patented in 1914. It was a simple device consisting of a cotton hood with two hoses which hung down to the floor, allowing the wearer to breathe the safer air found there. In addition, moist sponges were inserted at the end of the hoses in order to better filter the air.

=== World War I ===
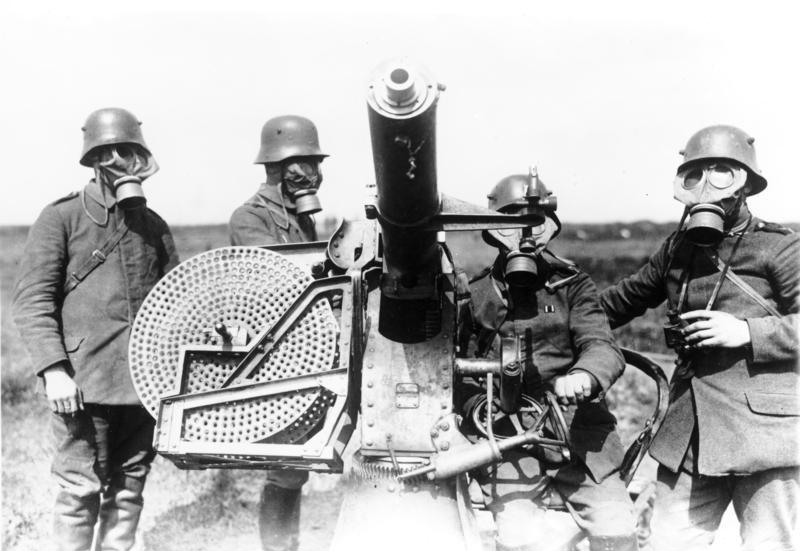
German soldiers with gas masks, 1916

The First World War brought about the first need for mass-produced gas masks on both sides because of extensive use of chemical weapons. The German army successfully used poison gas for the first time against Allied troops at the Second Battle of Ypres, Belgium on April 22, 1915. An immediate response was cotton wool wrapped in muslin, issued to the troops by May 1. This was followed by the Black Veil Respirator, invented by John Scott Haldane, which was a cotton pad soaked in an absorbent solution which was secured over the mouth using black cotton veiling.

Seeking to improve on the Black Veil respirator, Cluny Macpherson created a mask made of chemical-absorbing fabric which fitted over the entire head: a 50.5 cm × 48 cm (19.9 in × 18.9 in) canvas hood treated with chlorine-absorbing chemicals, and fitted with a transparent mica eyepiece. Macpherson presented his idea to the British War Office Anti-Gas Department on May 10, 1915; prototypes were developed soon after. The design was adopted by the British Army and introduced as the British Smoke Hood in June 1915; Macpherson was appointed to the War Office Committee for Protection against Poisonous Gases. More elaborate sorbent compounds were added later to further iterations of his helmet (PH helmet), to defeat other respiratory poison gases used such as phosgene, diphosgene and chloropicrin. In summer and autumn 1915, Edward Harrison, Bertram Lambert and John Sadd developed the Large Box Respirator. This canister gas mask had a tin can containing the absorbent materials by a hose and began to be issued in February 1916. A compact version, the Small Box Respirator, was made a universal issue from August 1916.

In the first gas masks of World War I, it was initially found that wood charcoal was a good absorbent of poison gases. Around 1918, it was found that charcoals made from the shells and seeds of various fruits and nuts such as coconuts, chestnuts, horse-chestnuts, and peach stones performed much better than wood charcoal. These waste materials were collected from the public in recycling programs to assist the war effort.

The first effective filtering activated charcoal gas mask in the world was invented in 1915 by Russian chemist Nikolay Zelinsky.

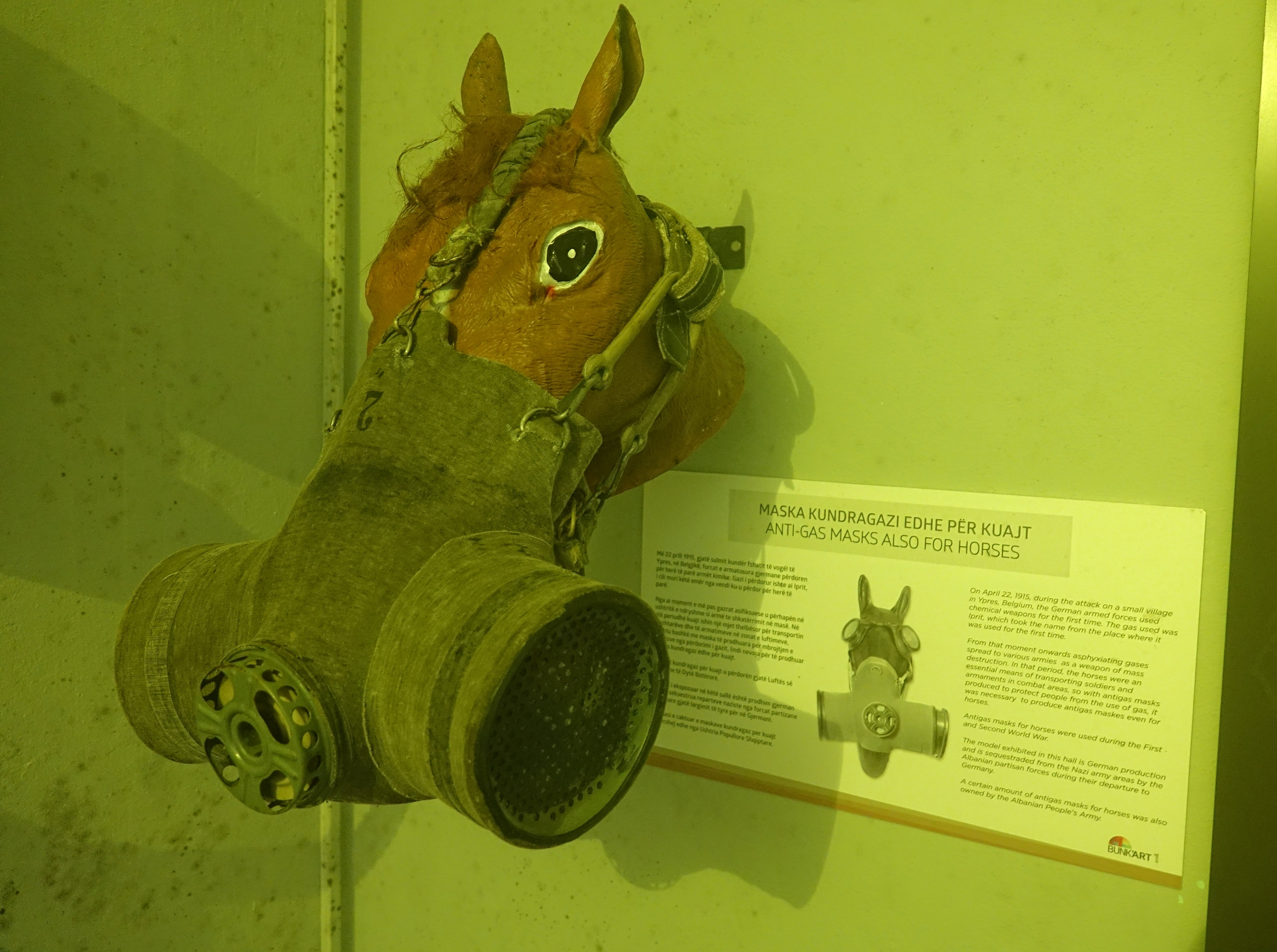
Gas mask for horses

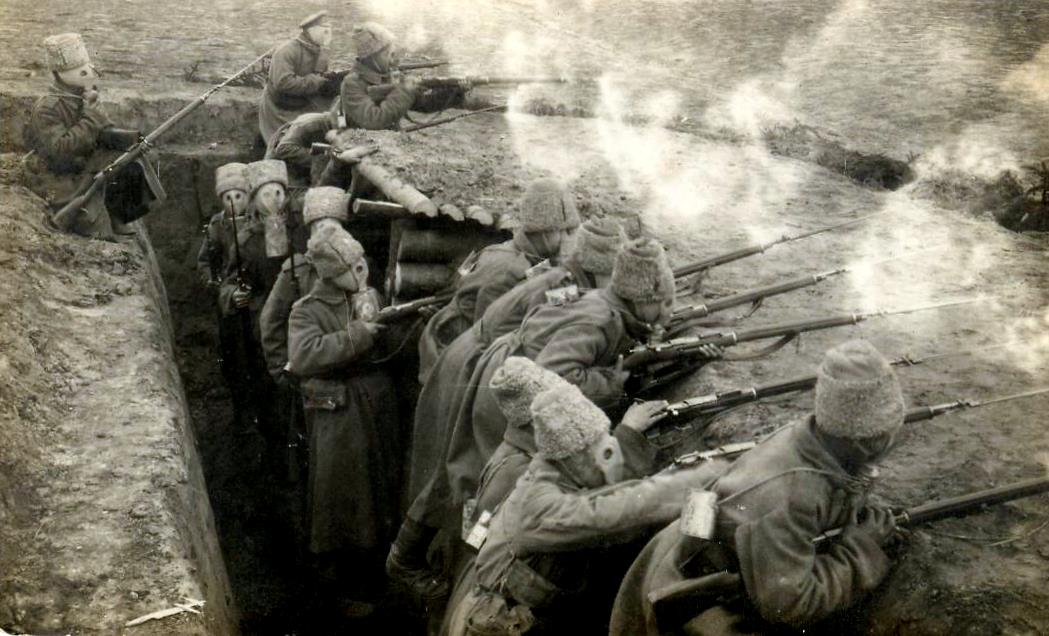
1916, Russian soldiers

Also in World War I, since dogs were frequently used on the front lines, a special type of gas mask was developed that dogs were trained to wear. Other gas masks were developed during World War I and the time following for horses in the various mounted units that operated near the front lines. In America, thousands of gas masks were produced for American as well as Allied troops. Mine Safety Appliances was a chief producer. This mask was later used widely in industry.

=== World War II ===
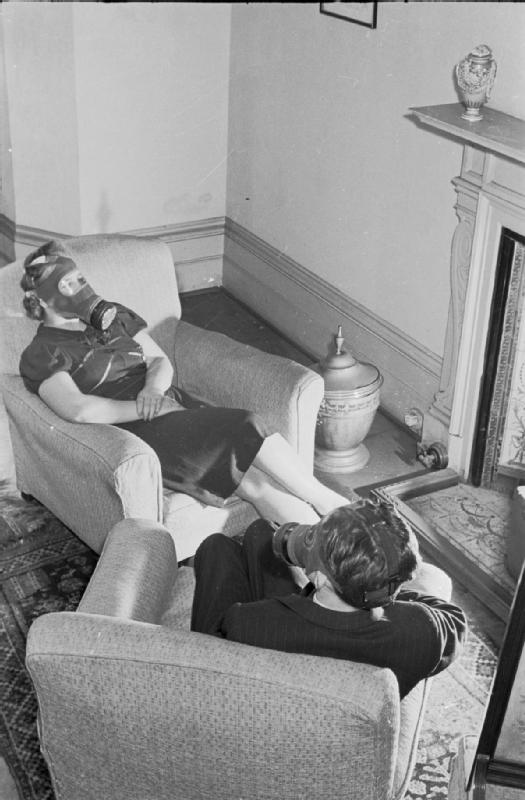
A British couple wearing gas masks in their home in 1941

Home Office distribution of gas masks to the civilian population in Britain commended 26 September 1938. Hackney Council received 196,550 gas masks which it issued through its Borough Scheme. Lacking cardboard boxes to put them in and hastily assembled, many became inoperable. A British respirator, Anti-Gas (Light) was developed for the British army in 1943. It was made of plastic and rubber-like material that greatly reduced the weight and bulk compared to World War I gas masks, and fitted the user's face more snugly and comfortably. The main improvement was replacing the separate filter canister connected with a hose by an easily replaceable filter canister screwed on the side of the gas mask. Also, it had replaceable plastic lenses.

=== Modern mask ===
Gas mask development since has mirrored the development of chemical agents in warfare, filling the need to protect against ever more deadly threats, biological weapons, and radioactive dust in the nuclear era. However, for agents that cause harm through contact or penetration of the skin, such as blister agent or nerve agent, a gas mask alone is not sufficient protection, and full protective clothing must be worn in addition to protect from contact with the atmosphere. For reasons of civil defence and personal protection, individuals often buy gas masks since they believe that they protect against the harmful effects of an attack with nuclear, biological, or chemical (NBC) agents, which is only partially true, as gas masks protect only against respiratory absorption. Most military gas masks are designed to be capable of protecting against all NBC agents, but they can have filter canisters proof against those agents (heavier) or only against riot control agents and smoke (lighter and often used for training purposes). There are lightweight masks solely for protection against riot-control agents and not for NBC situations.

Although thorough training and the availability of gas masks and other protective equipment can nullify the casualty-causing effects of an attack by chemical agents, troops who are forced to operate in full protective gear are less efficient in completing tasks, tire easily, and may be affected psychologically by the threat of attack by those weapons. During the Cold War, it was seen as inevitable that there would be a constant NBC threat on the battlefield and so troops needed protection in which they could remain fully functional; thus, protective gear and especially gas masks have evolved to incorporate innovations in terms of increasing user comfort and compatibility with other equipment (from drinking devices to artificial respiration tubes, to communications systems etc.).

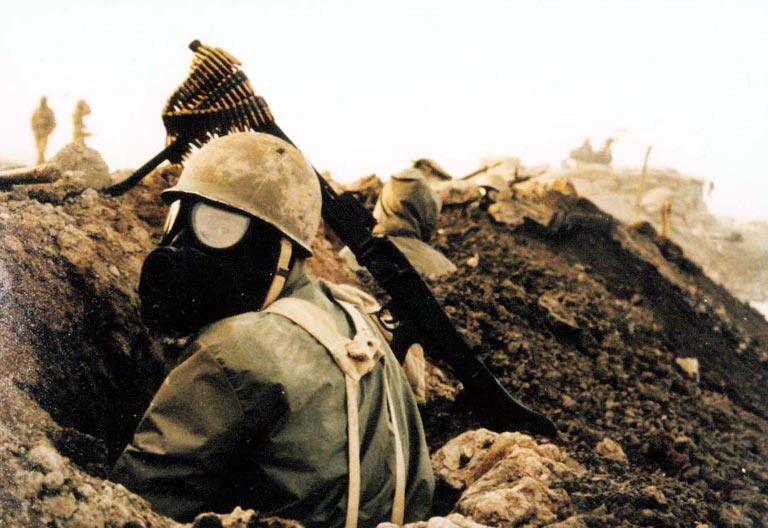
Iranian soldier wearing a US M17 protective mask on the frontline of the Iran–Iraq War

During the Iran–Iraq War (1980–88), Iraq developed its chemical weapons program with the help of European countries such as Germany and France and used them in a large scale against Iranians and Iraqi Kurds. Iran was unprepared for chemical warfare. In 1984, Iran received gas masks from the Republic of Korea and East Germany, but the Korean masks were not suited for the faces of non-East Asian people, the filter lasted for only 15 minutes, and the 5,000 masks bought from East Germany proved to be not gas masks but spray-painting goggles. As late as 1986, Iranian diplomats still travelled in Europe to buy active charcoal and models of filters to produce defensive gear domestically. In April 1988, Iran started domestic production of gas masks by the Iran Yasa factories.

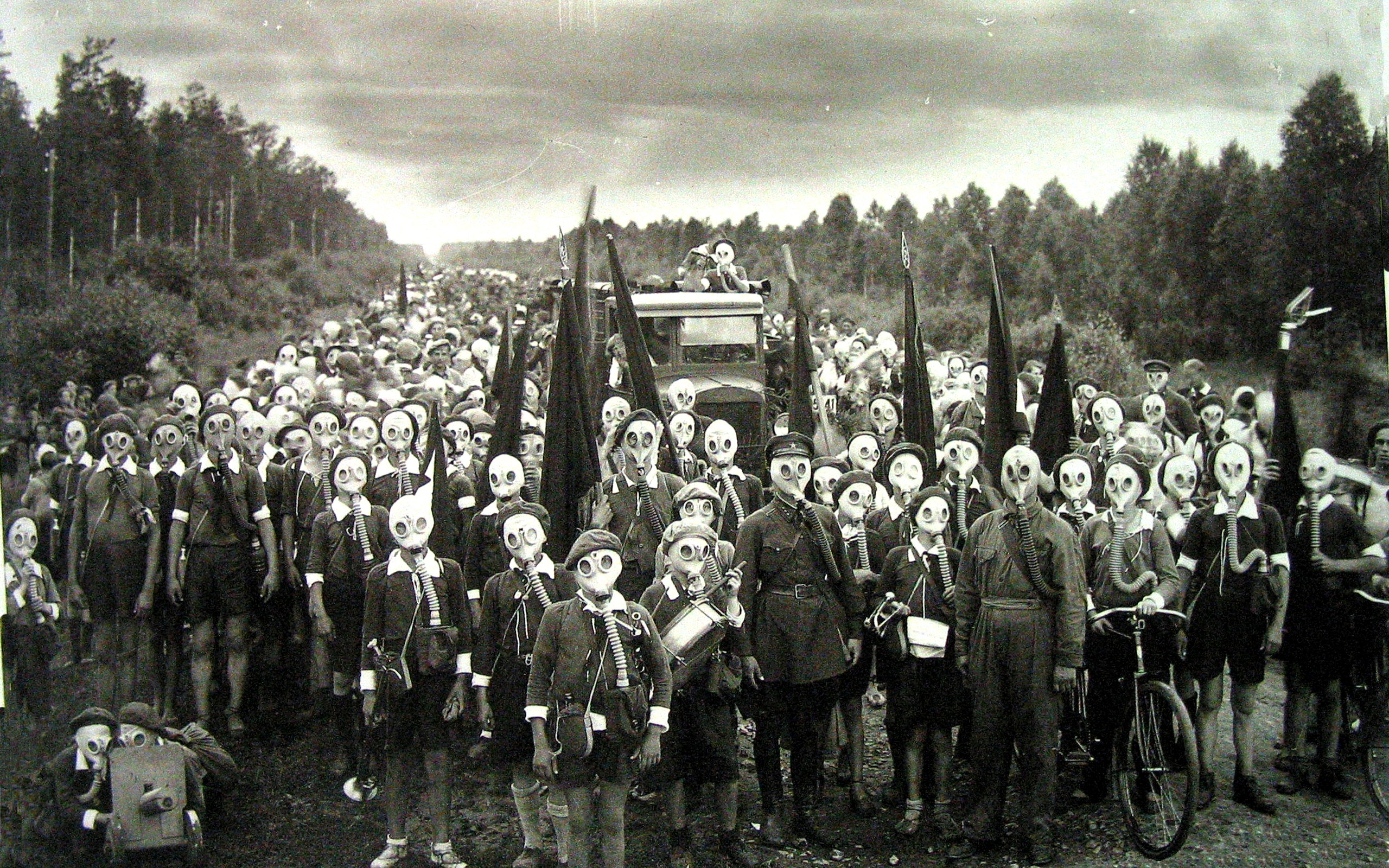
Pioneers in gas masks. USSR, 1937

== Principles of construction ==
Absorption is the process of being drawn into a (usually larger) body or substrate, and adsorption is the process of deposition upon a surface. This can be used to remove both particulate and gaseous hazards. Although some form of reaction may take place, it is not necessary; the method may work by attractive charges. For example, if the target particles are positively charged, a negatively charged substrate may be used. Examples of substrates include activated carbon, and zeolites. This effect can be very simple and highly effective, for example using a damp cloth to cover the mouth and nose while escaping a fire. While this method can be effective at trapping particulates produced by combustion, it does not filter out harmful gases which may be toxic or which displace the oxygen required for survival.

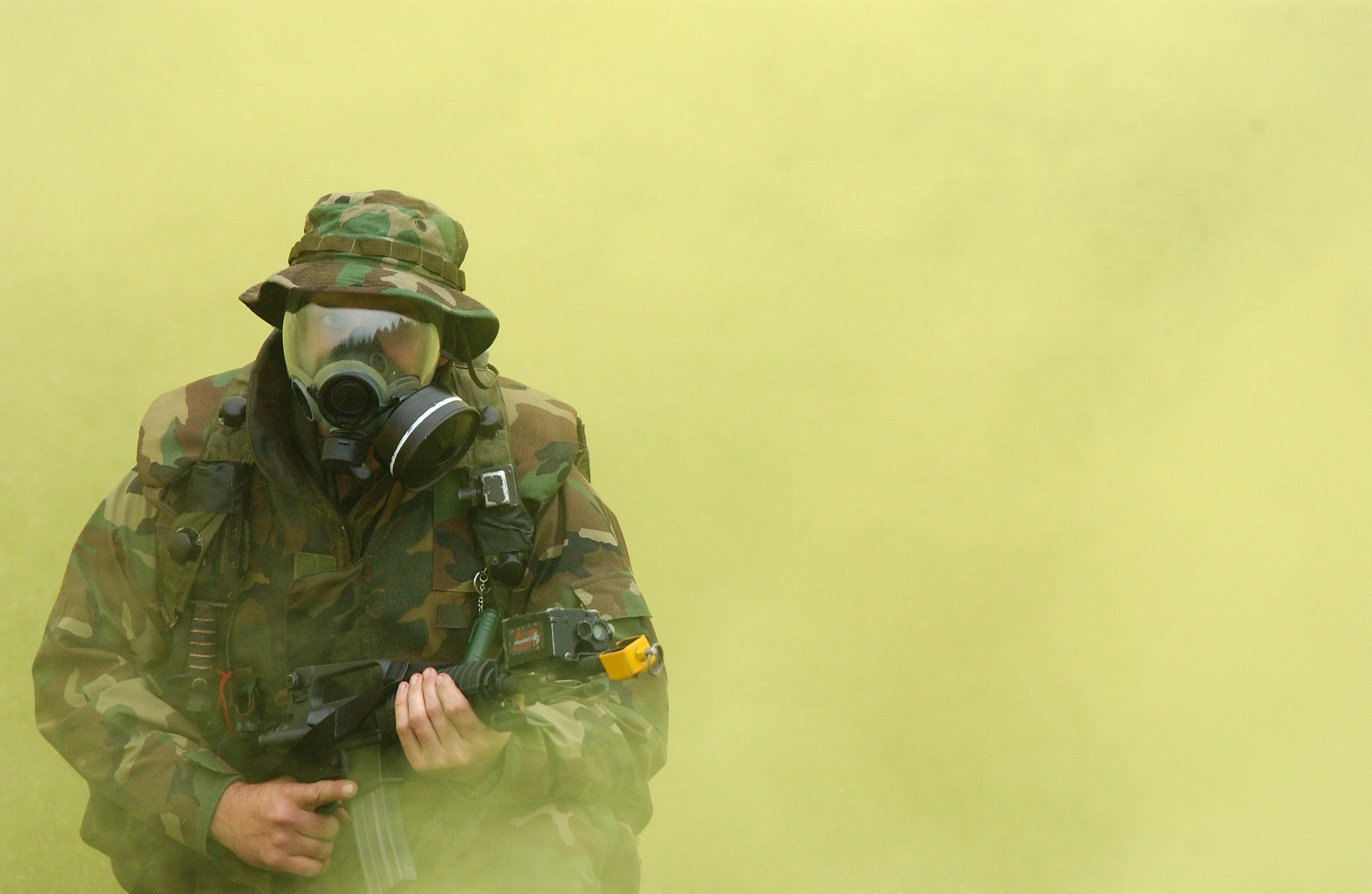
US Navy MCU-2/P gas mask system.

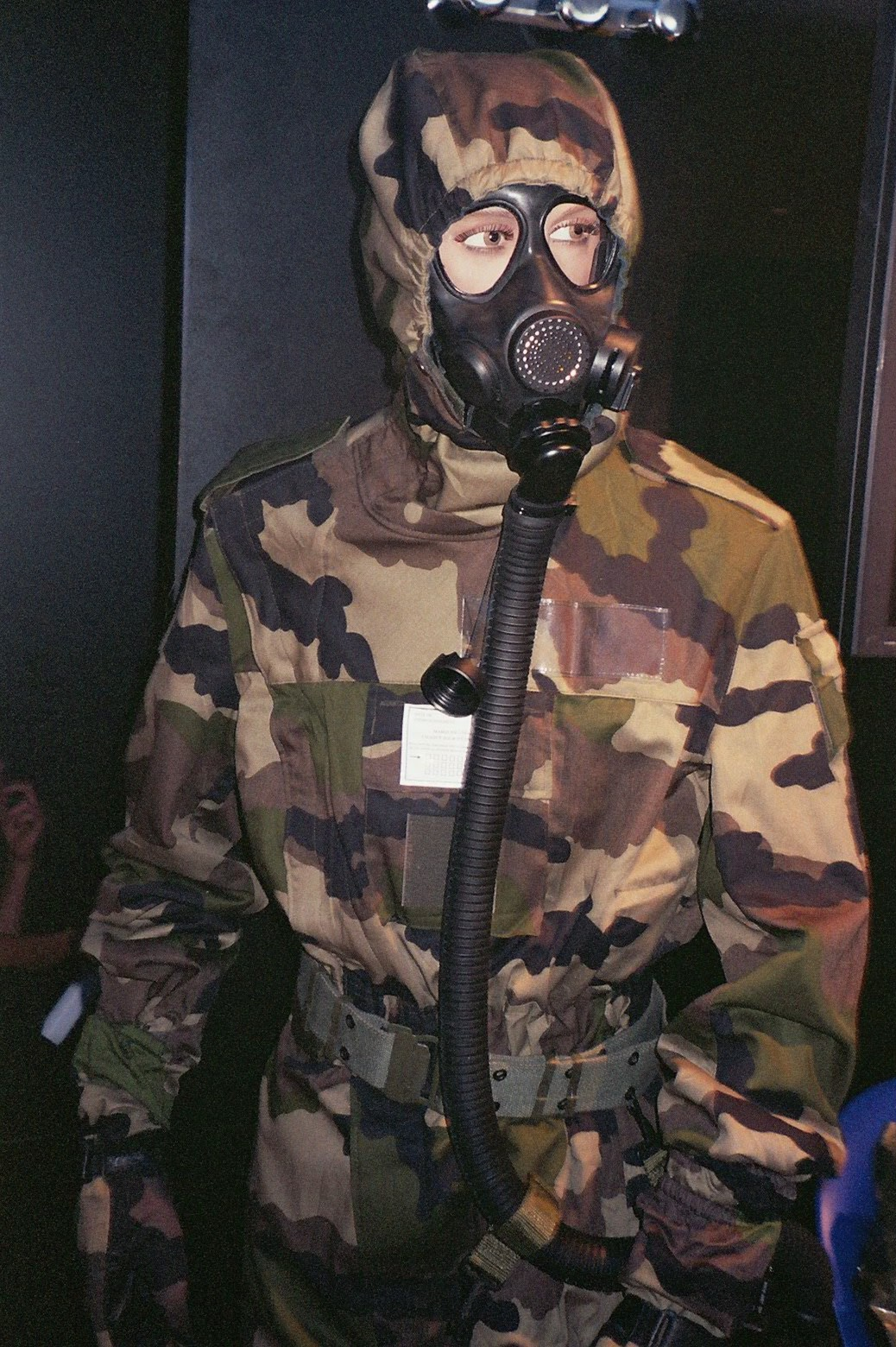
Gas mask used by the French military. The filter cartridge is connected via a flexible hose.

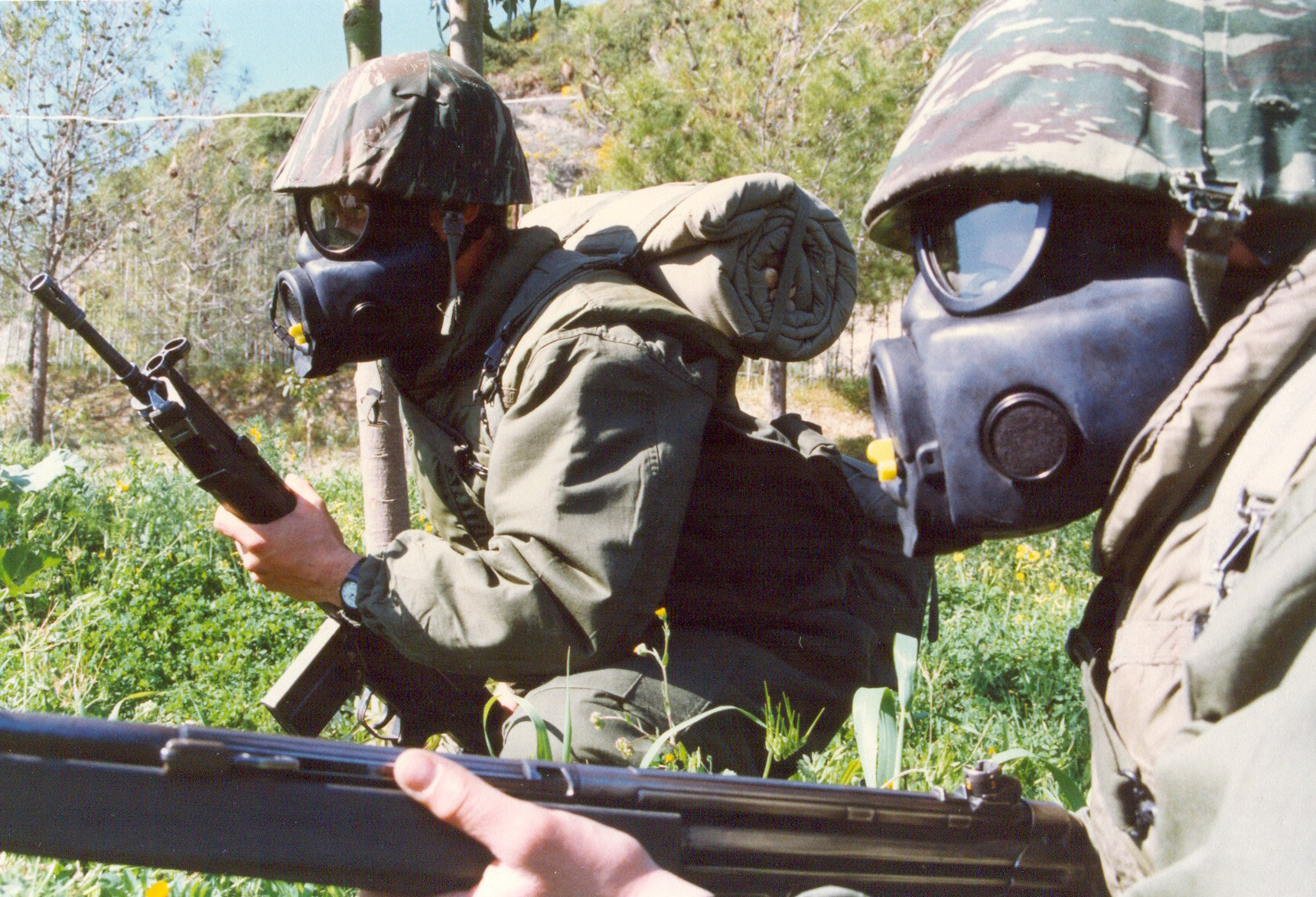
Greek Infantry with US M17 gas masks

=== Safety of old gas masks ===
Gas masks have a useful lifespan limited by the absorbent capacity of the filter. Filters cease to provide protection when saturated with hazardous chemicals, and degrade over time even if sealed. Most gas masks have sealing caps over the air intake and are stored in vacuum-sealed bags to prevent the filter from degrading due to exposure to humidity and pollutants in normal air. Unused gas mask filters from World War II may not protect the wearer at all, and could be harmful if worn due to long-term changes in the chemical composition of the filter.

Some World War II and Soviet Cold War gas mask filters contained chrysotile asbestos or crocidolite asbestos. not known to be harmful at the time. It is not reliably known for how long the materials were used in filters.

Typically, masks using 40 mm connections are a more recent design. Rubber degrades with time, so boxed unused "modern type" masks can be cracked and leak. The US C2 canister (black) contains hexavalent chromium; studies by the U.S. Army Chemical Corps found that the level in the filter was acceptable, but suggest caution when using, as it is a carcinogen.

=== Modern filter classification ===
The filter is selected according to the toxic compound. Each filter type protects against a particular hazard and is color-coded:

Filter types
EU Class, color	US color	Hazard
AX, brown	Black	Low-boiling (≤65 °C) organic compounds
A, brown	Black	High-boiling (>65 °C) organic compounds
B, grey	(many)	Inorganic gases (hydrogen sulfide, chlorine, hydrogen cyanide)
E, yellow	White	Acidic gases (Sulfur dioxide and hydrogen chloride)
K, green	Green	Ammonia and amines
CO, black	Blue	Carbon monoxide
Hg, red	—N/a	Mercury vapor
R(eactor), orange	Magenta	Radioactive particles (iodine and methyl iodide)
P, white	Purple, Orange, Teal	Particles

Particle filters are often included, because in many cases the hazardous materials are in the form of mist, which can be captured by the particle filter before entering the chemical adsorber. In Europe and jurisdictions with similar rules such as Russia and Australia, filter types are given suffix numbers to indicate their capacity. For non-particle hazards, the level "1" is assumed and a number "2" is used to indicate a better level. For particles (P), three levels are always given with the number. In the US, only the particle part is further classified by NIOSH air filtration ratings.

A filter type that can protect against multiple hazards is notated with the European symbols concatenated with each other. Examples include ABEK, ABEK-P3, and ABEK-HgP3. A2B2E2K2-P3 is the highest rating of filter available. An entirely different "multi/CBRN" filter class with an olive color is used in the US.

Filtration may be aided with an air pump to improve wearer comfort. Filtration of air is only possible if there is sufficient oxygen in the first place. Thus, when handling asphyxiants, or when ventilation is poor or the hazards are unknown, filtration is not possible and air must be supplied (with a SCBA system) from a pressurized bottle as in scuba diving.

== Use ==
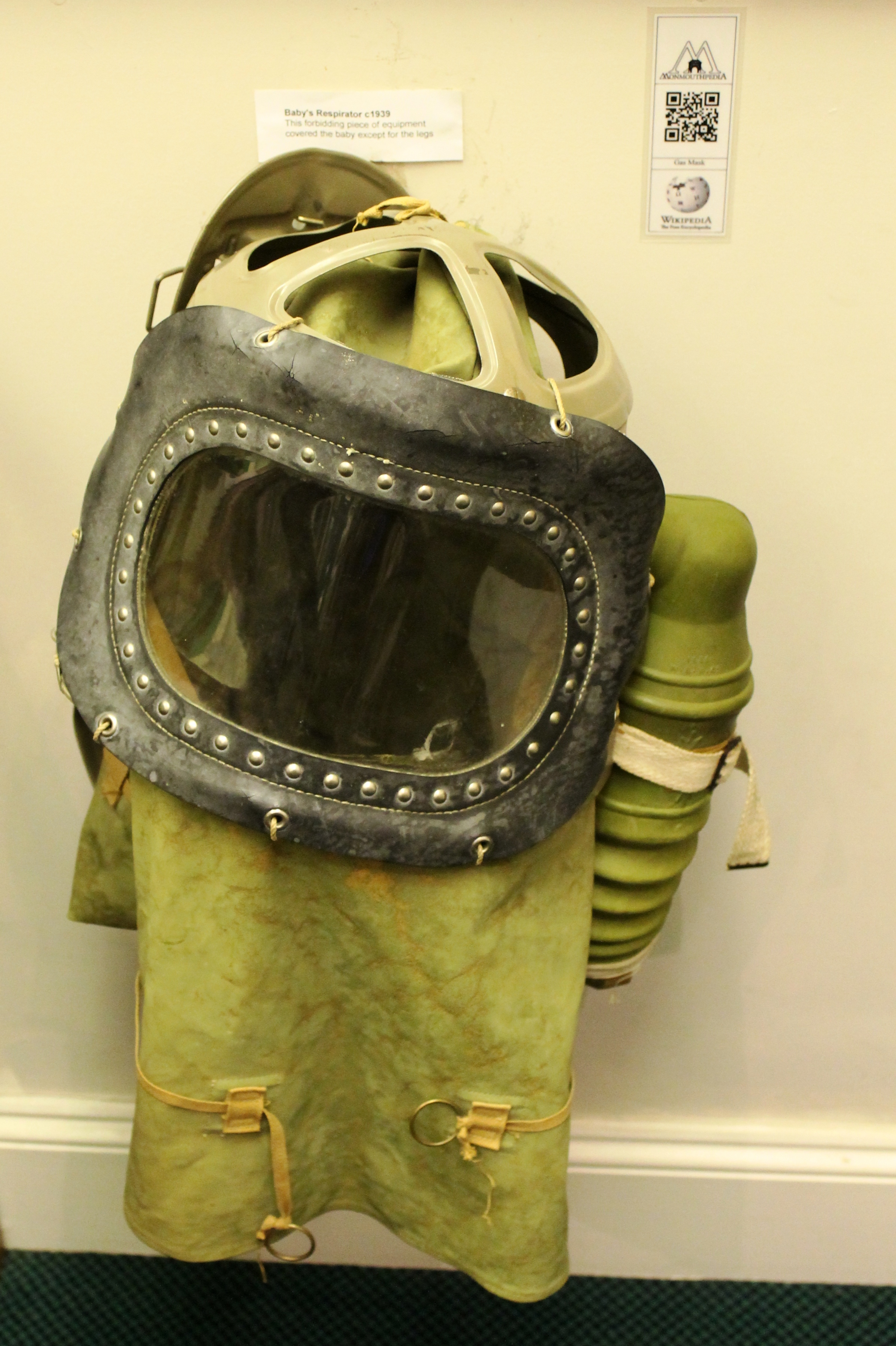
A 1939 Second World War-era baby's gas mask in Monmouth Regimental Museum. This design covered the whole of the baby except for its legs.

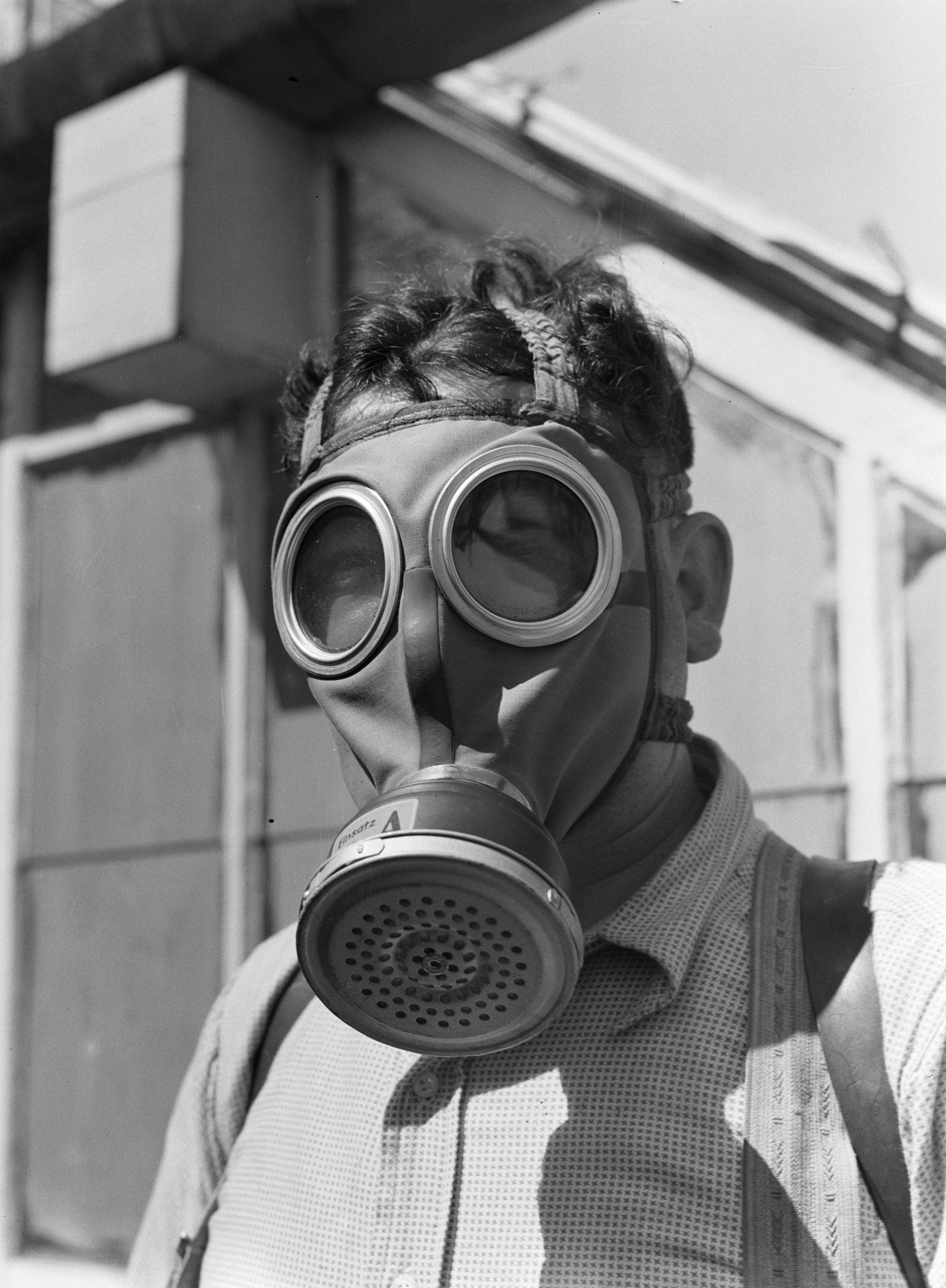
A worker in a plant nursery wears a respirator to protect against the insecticides sprayed in the greenhouses, 1930.

A modern mask typically is constructed of an elastic polymer in various sizes. It is fitted with various adjustable straps which may be tightened to secure a good fit. Crucially, it is connected to a filter cartridge near the mouth either directly, or via a flexible hose. Some models contain drinking tubes which may be connected to a water bottle. Corrective lens inserts are also available for users who require them.

Masks are typically tested for fit before use. After a mask is fitted, it is often tested by various challenge agents. Isoamyl acetate, a synthetic banana flavourant, and camphor are often used as innocuous challenge agents. In the military, teargases such as CN, CS, and stannic chloride in a chamber may be used to give the users confidence in the efficacy of the mask.

== Shortcomings ==
The protection of a gas mask comes with some disadvantages. The wearer of a typical gas mask must exert extra effort to breathe, and some of the exhaled air is re-inhaled due to the dead space between the facepiece and the user's face. The exposure to carbon dioxide may exceed its OELs (0.5% by volume/9 grammes per cubic metre for an eight-hour shift; 1.4%/27 grammes per m^{3} for 15 minutes' exposure) by a factor of many times: for gas masks and elastomeric respirators, up to 2.6%; and in case of long-term use, headache, dermatitis and acne may appear. The UK HSE textbook recommends limiting the use of respirators without air supply (that is, not PAPR) to one hour.

== Reaction and exchange ==
This principle relies on substances harmful to humans being usually more reactive than air. This method of separation will use some form of generally reactive substance (for example an acid) coating or supported by some solid material. An example is synthetic resins. These can be created with different groups of atoms (usually called functional groups) that have different properties. Thus a resin can be tailored to a particular toxic group. When the reactive substance comes in contact with the resin, it will bond to it, removing it from the air stream. It may also exchange with a less harmful substance at this site.

Though it was crude, the hypo helmet was a stopgap measure for British troops in the trenches that offered at least some protection during a gas attack. As the months passed and poison gas was used more often, more sophisticated gas masks were developed and introduced. There are two main difficulties with gas mask design:

- The user may be exposed to many types of toxic material. Military personnel are especially prone to being exposed to a diverse range of toxic gases. However, if the mask is for a particular use (such as the protection from a specific toxic material in a factory), then the design can be much simpler and the cost lower.
- The protection will wear off over time. Filters will clog up, substrates for absorption will fill up, and reactive filters will run out of reactive substances. Thus the user only has protection for a limited time, and then they must either replace the filter device in the mask, or use a new mask.
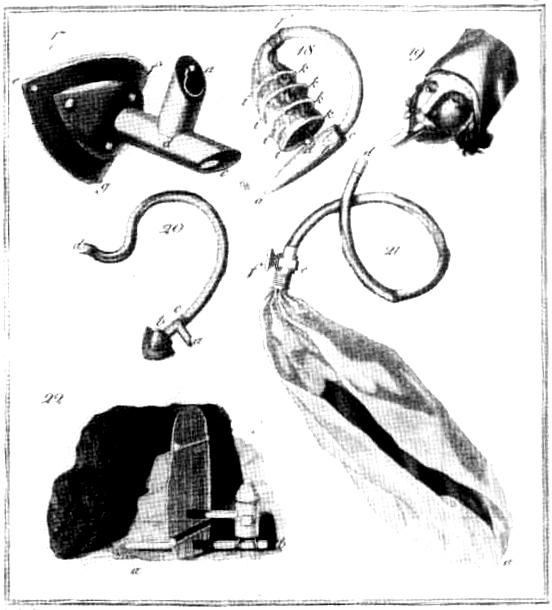
A primitive respirator was designed by Alexander von Humboldt in 1799 for underground mining

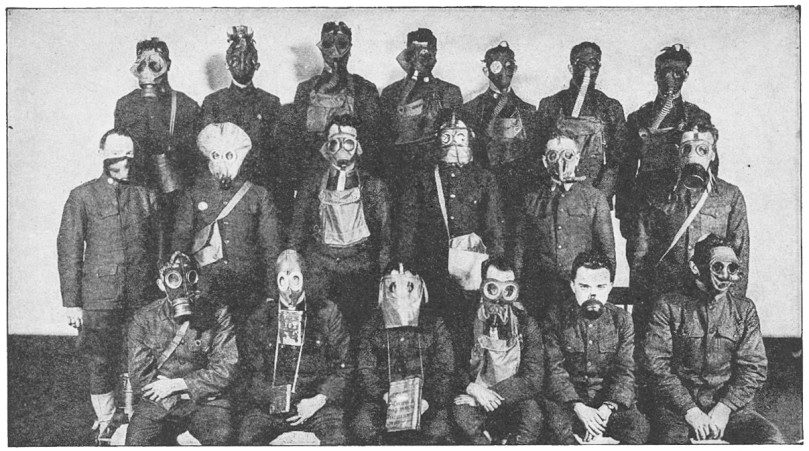
Various gas masks employed on the Western Front and Eastern Front during World War I

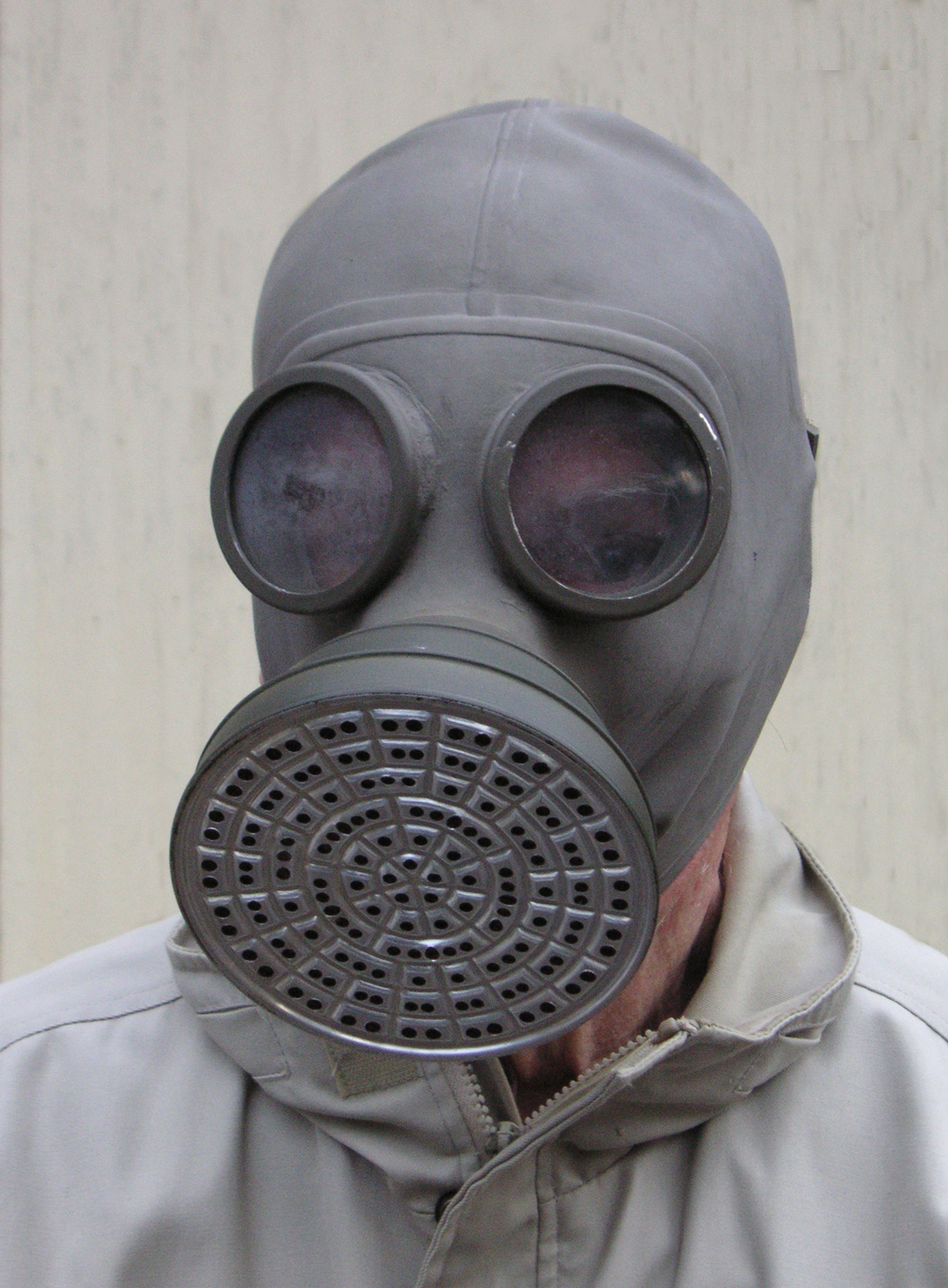
Finnish civilian gas mask from 1939. These masks were distributed during World War II

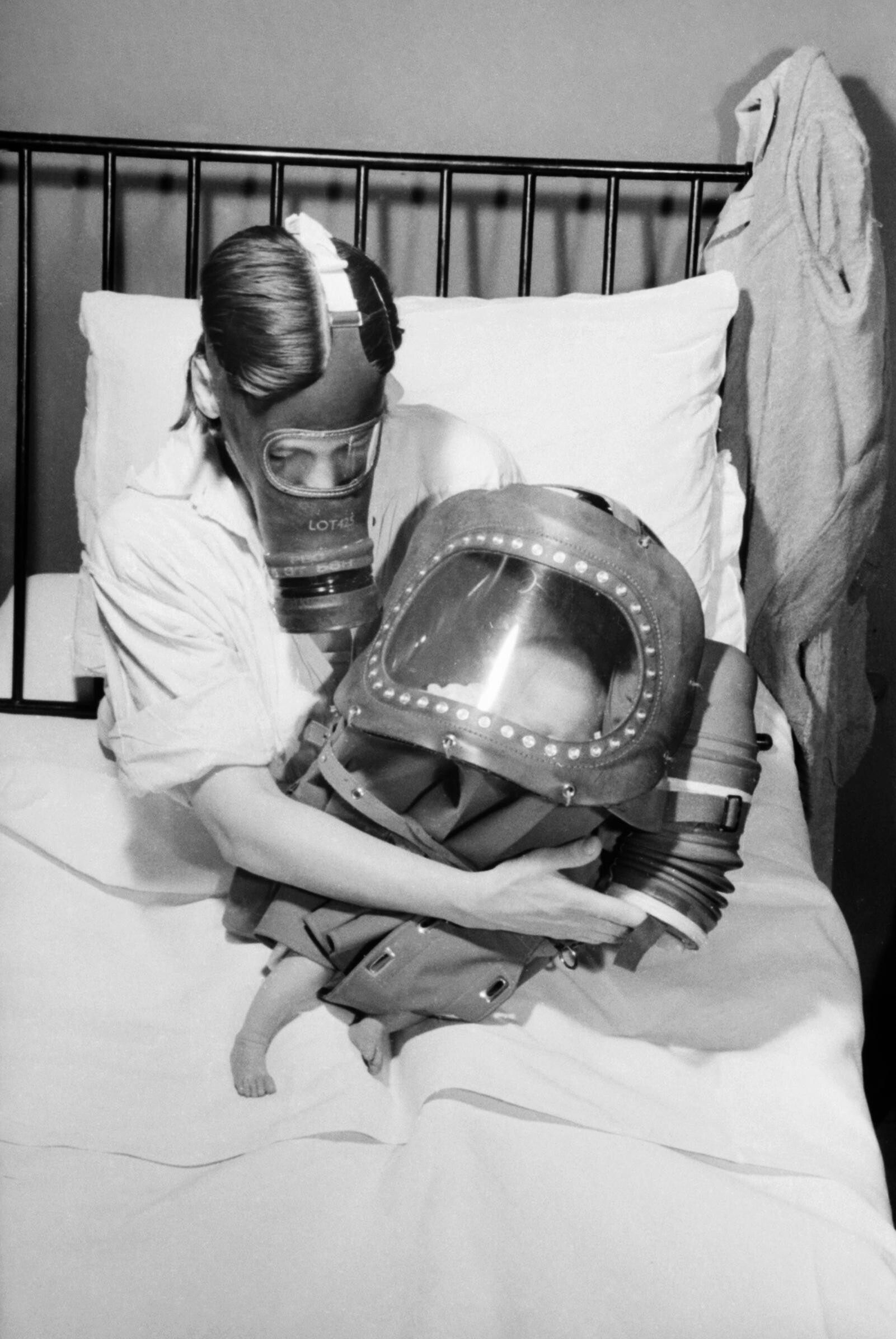
Mother and baby with gas masks, 1941

== See also ==
- Assigned Protection Factors
- Cartridges and canisters of air-purifying respirators
- GP-7 gas mask
- GP-5 gas mask
- Hopcalite
- M2 Gas Mask
- M40 Field Protective Mask
- M50 joint service general purpose mask
- C-4 Protective Mask
- NBC suit
- PH helmet
- Plague doctor's outfit
- Respirator
- Respirator fit test
- Respirators testing in the workplaces
- Respirator assigned protection factors
- Smoke hood

== Bibliography ==
- Wetherell, Anthony; Mathers, George (2007), "Respiratory Protection", in Marrs, Timothy; Maynard, Robert; Sidell, Frederick (eds.), Chemical Warfare Agents: Toxicology and Treatment, New York: Wiley, pp. 157–174, ISBN 978-0470013595
- Mayer-Maguire, Thomas; Baker, Brian (2015), British Military Respirators and Anti-Gas Equipment of the Two World Wars, Crowood
