= Lewis Haslett =

American inventor

Lewis Phectic Haslett was an American inventor and the first person to receive a patent (US 6529 , "Inhaler or Lung Protector") for an early form of the gas mask in 1849.
