= GP-7 gas mask =

Soviet made single filter gas mask

GP-7 Gas Mask
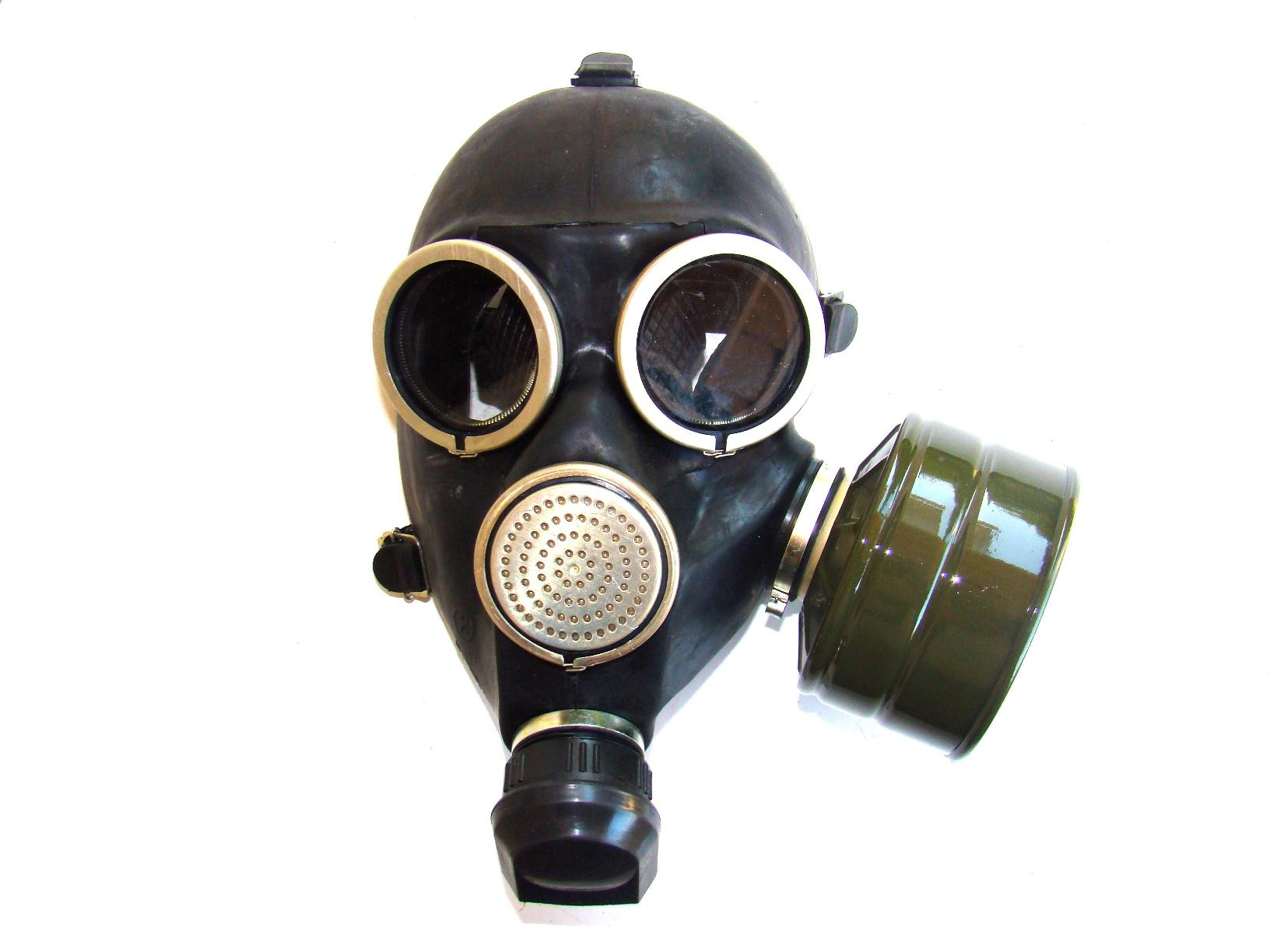
- The GP-7 gas mask displayed along with its original filter type that was issued together with the mask.
- Type: Gas mask
- Place of origin: Soviet Union

Service history
- In service: 1988–present
- Used by: Soviet Union, Russia

The GP-7 gas mask is a civilian gas mask that was produced by the Soviet Union during the Cold War era. The mask was designed to provide protection to civilians against nuclear, biological, and chemical (NBC) agents during the threat of the Cold War. It is distinguished from its military counterpart, the PMK, which was intended to be used exclusively for military purposes as opposed to the GP-7 which was designed solely for civil defense.

== Production ==
The GP-7 is made from a black rubbery material that was intended to be both durable and flexible. It has two circular eyepieces that provide a wide field of vision and allow the wearer to easily see in any direction. The mask also features a voice diaphragm for clear communication, a drinking tube for hydration while wearing the mask, and an exhale valve designed to prevent the buildup of moisture in the mask.

The GP-7 gas mask has a "helmet-mask" design, which allows it to fit over the head and be worn with a variety of military headgear. The mask has an adjustable elastic head harness and a rubber seal that ensures a secure and comfortable fit. The mask also has a lightweight design, which makes it easy to wear for extended periods of time.

The GP-7 gas mask uses a Gost 40mm filter thread that allows it to be equipped with a variety of different filters, and each filter was usually made for a collective or specific threat. The filter can be attached on the users left side of the mask. The filter provides protection against a wide range of NBC agents, including chemical warfare agents like Sarin and mustard gas, as well as biological agents like anthrax and smallpox, although mostly intended to be used for ammonia and its derivatives. Numerous other gas masks, such as the GP-5, have filters similar to these and have been proven to contain asbestos, arsenic and chromium.

The GP-7 gas mask was designed to be durable and long-lasting, and has been tested extensively in a variety of conditions. It was also designed to be easy to use and maintain, with spare parts and accessories readily available. The mask comes with a carrying bag for easy storage and transport, as well as an instruction manual that provides detailed information on how to use and maintain the mask.

== Components ==
- Front body
- Filter
- Inhale valve assembly
- Visual assembly (sight glass and inner and outer clips)
- Speaking diaphragm membrane (intercom)
- Exhale valve assembly
- Obturator for reliable sealing
- Occipital plate (headpiece)
- Front strap
- Temporal region cranial straps
- Buckles
- Cheek straps.

== Specifications ==
- The mass of the gas mask included without the bag is no more than 900 grams.
- The area of the field of view is not less than 60%.
- Resistance to constant airflow during inhalation at a volumetric air flow of 30 dm³ / min - no more than 176.4 Pa. (18 mm water column)
- The volume content of carbon dioxide in the inhaled air is not more than 1.0%
- The coefficient of suction under the front part of the standard oil mist aerosol is no more than 0.001% .
- The FPC permeability coefficient for standard oil mist aerosol is no more than 0.001%.
- Permeability coefficient for radioactive iodine-131 vapours - no more than 0.01%
- The operating temperature range is from minus 40 to 40 degrees Celsius Or minus 40 to 104 degrees Fahrenheit.

FPC protective action time for hazardous chemicals at an air flow rate of 30 dm³/min.

- Hydrogen cyanide at a concentration of 5.0 mg / dm³ - at least 18 minutes.
- Cyanogen chloride at a concentration of 5.0 mg / dm³ - at least 18 minutes.
- Hydrogen sulfide at a concentration of 10.0 mg / dm³ - at least 25 minutes.
- Chlorine at a concentration of 5.0 mg / dm³ - at least 40 minutes.
- Hydrochloric acid at a concentration of 5.0 mg / dm³ - at least 20 minutes.
- Tetraethyllead at a concentration of 2.0 mg / dm³ - at least 50 minutes.
- Ethylmercaptan at a concentration of 5.0 mg / dm³ - at least 40 minutes.
- Nitrobenzene at a concentration of 5.0 mg / dm³ - at least 40 minutes.
- Phenol at a concentration of 0.2 mg / dm³ - at least 200 minutes.
- Furfural at a concentration of 1.5 mg / dm³ - at least 300 minutes.

FPC protective action time when used with an additional DPG-3 cartridge for hazardous chemicals at an air flow rate of 30 dm³/min.

- Hydrogen cyanide at a concentration of 5.0 mg / dm³ - at least 18 minutes.
- Cyanogen chloride at a concentration of 5.0 mg / dm³ - at least 18 minutes.
- Hydrogen sulfide at a concentration of 10.0 mg / dm³ - at least 50 minutes.
- Chlorine at a concentration of 5.0 mg / dm³ - at least 100 minutes.
- Hydrochloric acid at a concentration of 5.0 mg / dm³ - at least 30 minutes.
- Tetraethyllead at a concentration of 2.0 mg / dm³ - at least 500 minutes.
- Ethylmercaptan at a concentration of 5.0 mg / dm³ - at least 120 minutes.
- Nitrobenzene at a concentration of 5.0 mg / dm³ - at least 70 minutes.
- Phenol at a concentration of 0.2 mg / dm³ - at least 800 minutes.
- Furfural at a concentration of 1.5 mg / dm³ - at least 400 minutes.
- Ammonia at a concentration of 5.0 mg / dm³ - at least 60 minutes.
- Dimethylamine at a concentration of 5.0 mg / dm³ - at least 80 minutes.

== Modifications ==
From 2008 to 2014, a number of Russian manufacturing enterprises developed and produced a range of modifications of the GP-7 (GP-7V) civilian gas mask. The development was based on the use of similar face parts from the PMG (PMG-V) and their modifications - PMU (PMU-V), as well as filters in metal housings, such as GP-7KB-Universal (later renamed to FK-Universal), VK 320, VK 450 and others. Additionally, some manufacturing enterprises produced variations of civilian gas masks with plastic cases for filters, such as GP-7BV (GP-7B) and GP-7B (GP-7VMB). However, in these variations, in addition to the use of different materials for the filters, there were other significant design features that do not allow these variations of gas masks to be unambiguously classified as modifications of the GP-7 (GP-7V) gas mask. Currently, the following modifications of the GP-7 (GP-7V) are the most widely used: GP-7VM, GP-7VMT, GP-8V, GP-7B Universal (GP-7BV Universal), GP-9, UZS VK and MZS VK.

Despite the wide variety of modifications, the GP-7 (GP-7V) civilian gas mask still remains unparalleled in a number of indicators of protective action time for substances such as chlorine, hydrogen sulfide, and, when used with an additional DPG-3 cartridge, ammonia.

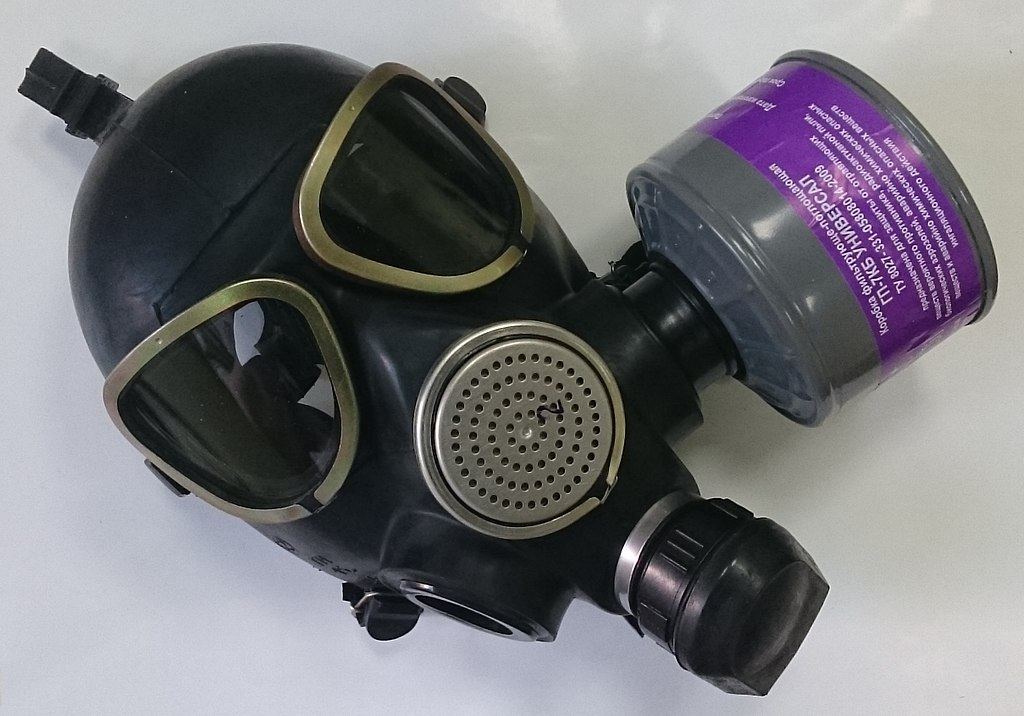
Civilian gas mask GP-7B Universal

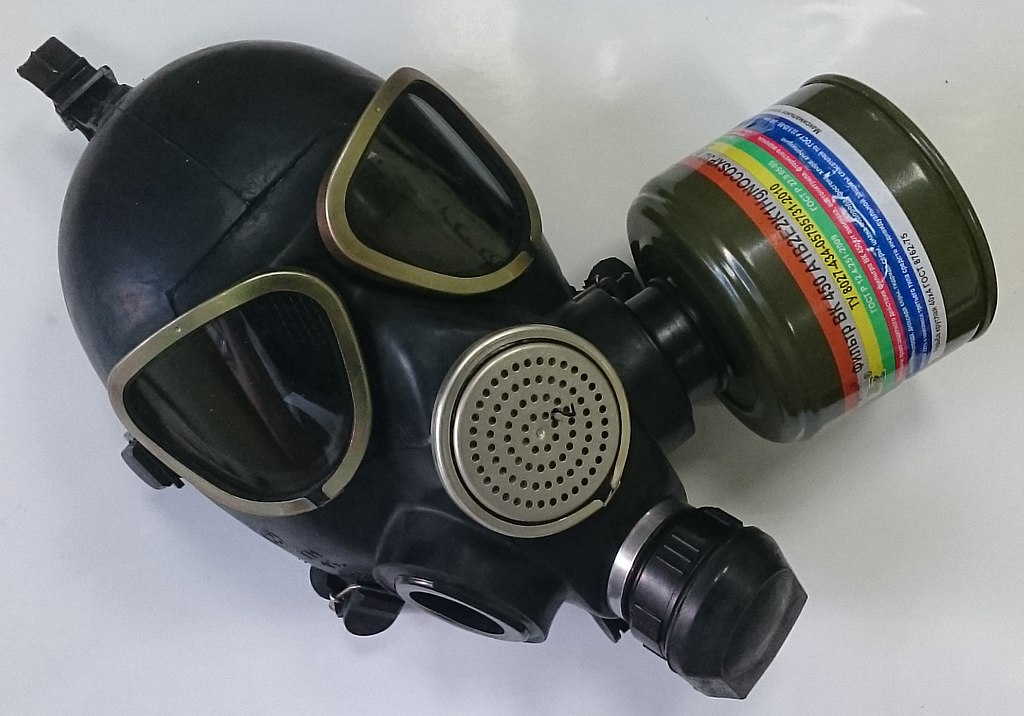
Civil gas mask MZS VK

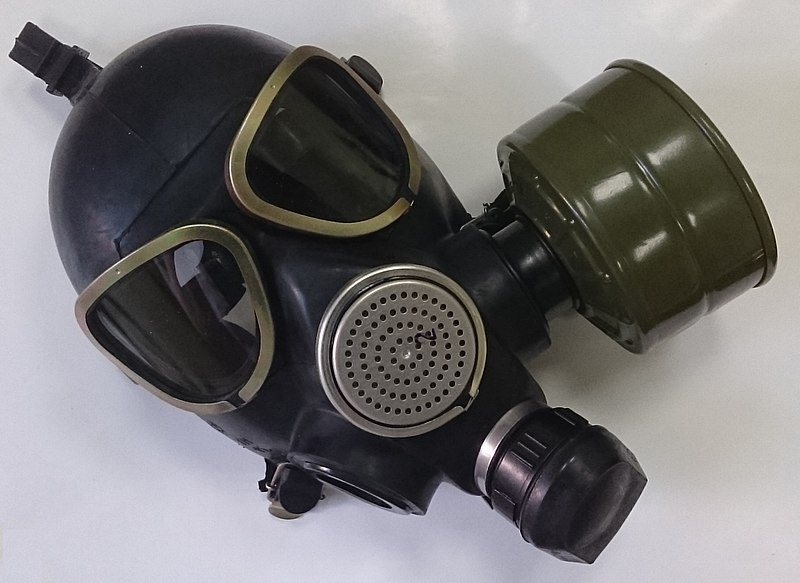
Civil gas mask GP-7VM

== Packaging and storage ==
GP-7 were packed, transported and stored in their original packaging - wooden boxes, which were sealed by and at the manufacturing warehouse. Each box contains 20 sets of gas masks: 8 sets with face parts of size 1, 8 sets of face parts of size 2, 4 sets of face parts of size 3. Each box contains a manual for the operation of the gas mask. In box No. 1 of each batch of gas masks, a form for the batch is inserted. As a rule, each batch contains 1000 pieces of civilian gas masks GP-7 (50 boxes).

The warranty period of storage of the civilian gas mask GP-7 provided by the manufacturers is 12 years from the date of manufacture, with the exception of non-fogging films NPN-59, the warranty period of which is 7 years.

== Additional information ==
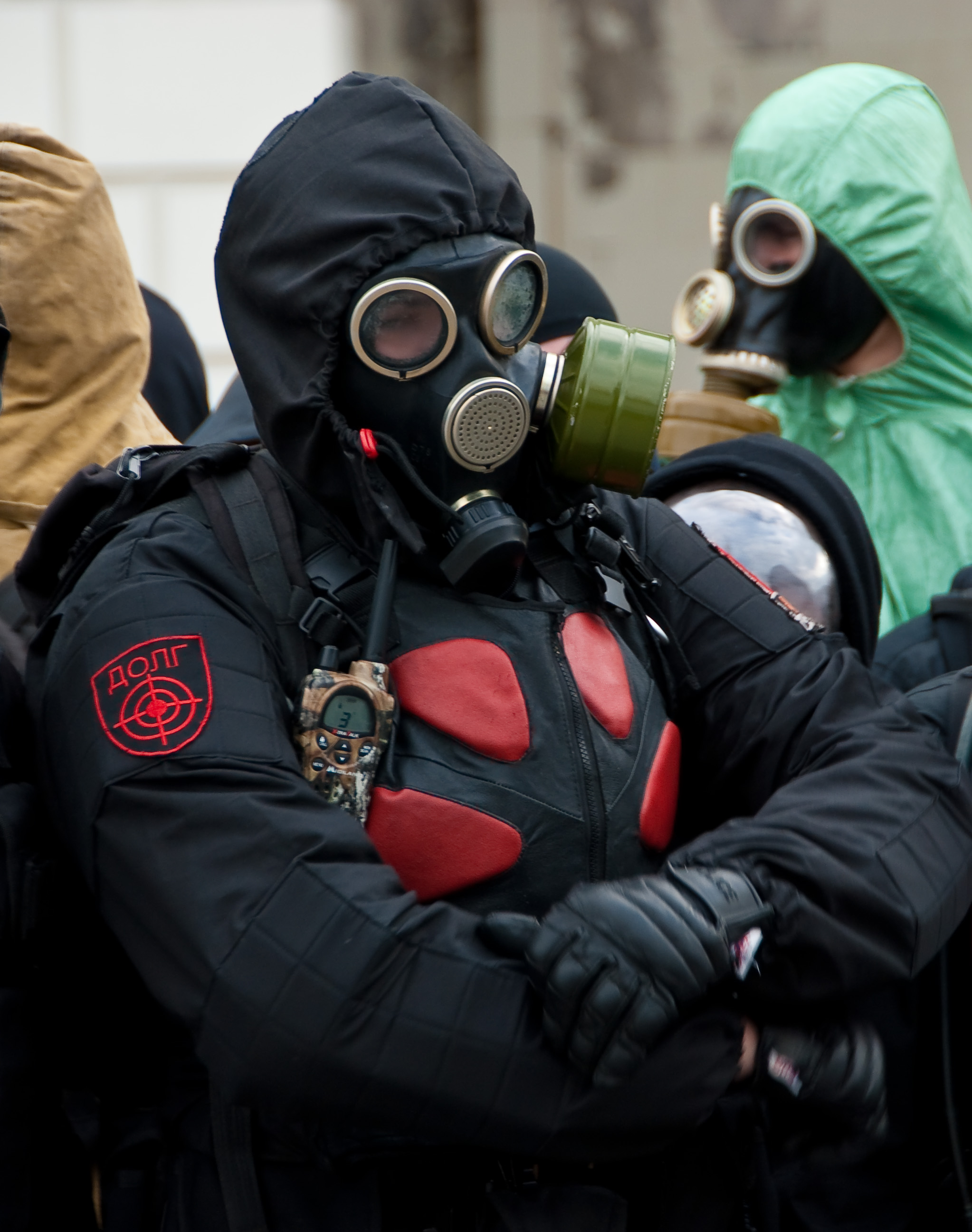
A cosplayer at Stalker fest 2009 wearing the GP-7 gas mask.

The GP-7 provides a limited time of protective action against ammonia and its derivatives. It does not provide protection against organic gases and vapours with a boiling point of less than 65 °C [149 °F] such as: methane, ethane, acetylene, ethylene oxide, isobutane, carbon monoxide and nitrogen oxides.

To provide additional protection against ammonia and its derivatives, the mask can be equipped with an additional DPG-3 cartridge, which, when used in conjunction with the FPK GP-7K, is connected to the front part of the connecting corrugated tube. To protect against carbon monoxide and nitrogen oxides, it is necessary to use a set of filters of special PZU-PC.

Quality control and acceptance of civilian gas masks GP-7 at manufacturing enterprises is carried out by military representations of the Ministry of Defence of the Russian Federation.

== Pop culture and use today ==
The GP-7 gas mask was widely used by Soviet and Warsaw Pact civilians during the Cold War era, and is often used today by various military forces and military enthusiasts. While it has become slightly outdated compared to newer models of gas masks, it remains a popular choice for cosplayers, collectors and enthusiasts of Gas Mask equipment. It is also still occasionally used in modern Post-Soviet countries for civil defence.
