= GP-5 gas mask =

Soviet-made single-filter gas mask

GP-5 Gas Mask
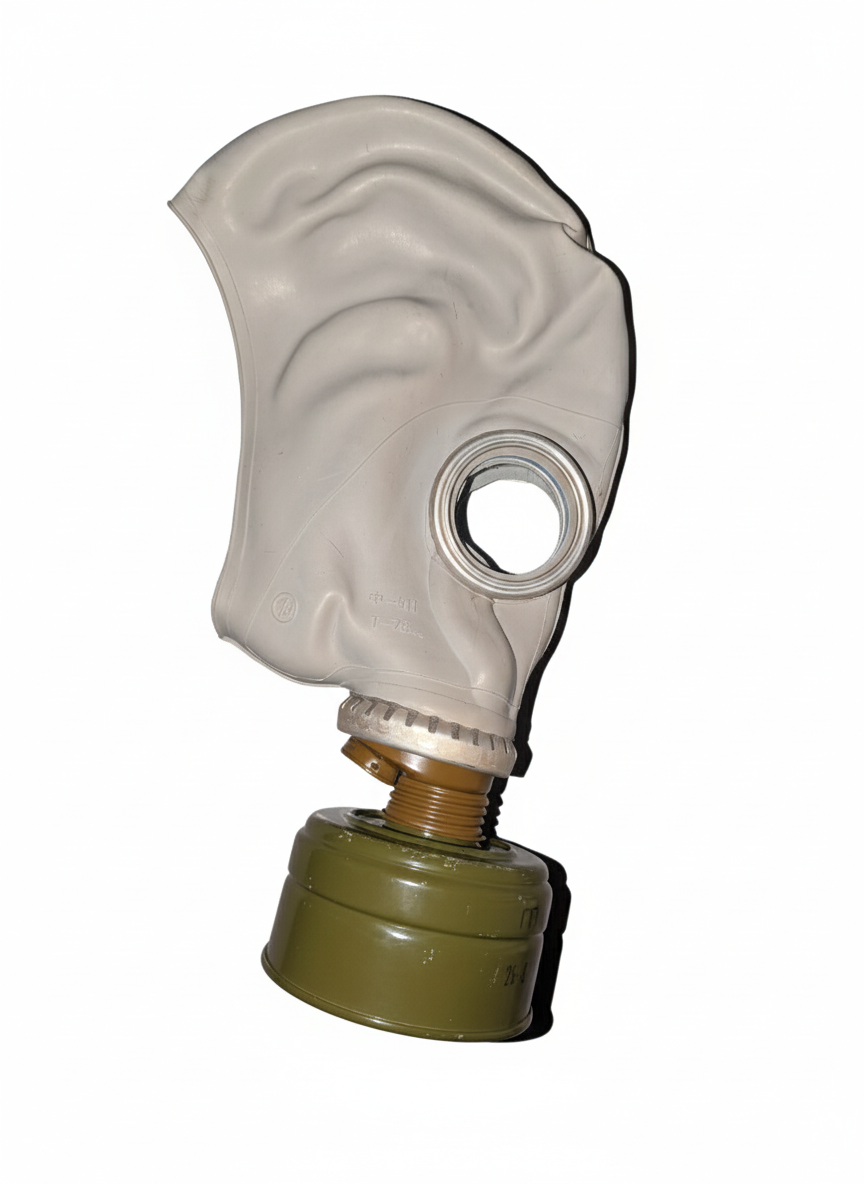
- gasmask GP-5
- Type: Gas mask
- Place of origin: Soviet Union

Service history
- In service: 1962–1992
- Used by: Soviet Union

The GP-5 gas mask kit (Russian: Гражда́нский Противога́з-5, romanized: Grazhdanskiy Protivogaz-5) is a Soviet-made gas mask kit, which contains a single-filter ShM-62 or Shm-62U gas mask. It was issued to the Soviet population starting in 1962 during the Cold War. Production of the kit ended in 1990. The number of GP-5 kits produced was three times more than the population of the Soviet Union. The GP-5 kit was originally made to protect the wearer from radioactive fallout from the Cold War and was distributed to most fallout shelters. They were tested in Poland to determine if they have NBC protective capabilities. It was concluded that the mask would last in an NBC situation for 24 hours.

== History ==
The GP-5 was historically used by the USSR for NBC protection. Since then, the mask has become a popular item in pop culture and is referenced widely in video games and films, as it is very cheap due to being one of the most produced gas masks.

When shortcomings in the operation of the GP-5 were identified, it was modernized, becoming the "modernized civilian gas mask model 5" - GP-5M for short.

Ubiquitous in industries and civil defense shelters, it is still sometimes used as a training RPE in life safety classes, although now it is mostly replaced by modern gas mask equipment and occasionally more modern Soviet-era gas masks.

The GP-5 kit is widely available on the army surplus market, usually very cheaply ($5 to $25), and is often used as a part of Halloween or fancy dress costumes, including cosplay. They are a favorite of gas mask collectors because they are easy to obtain and have the "old" circular eyepieces like masks used in World War II and the "helmet" type masks.

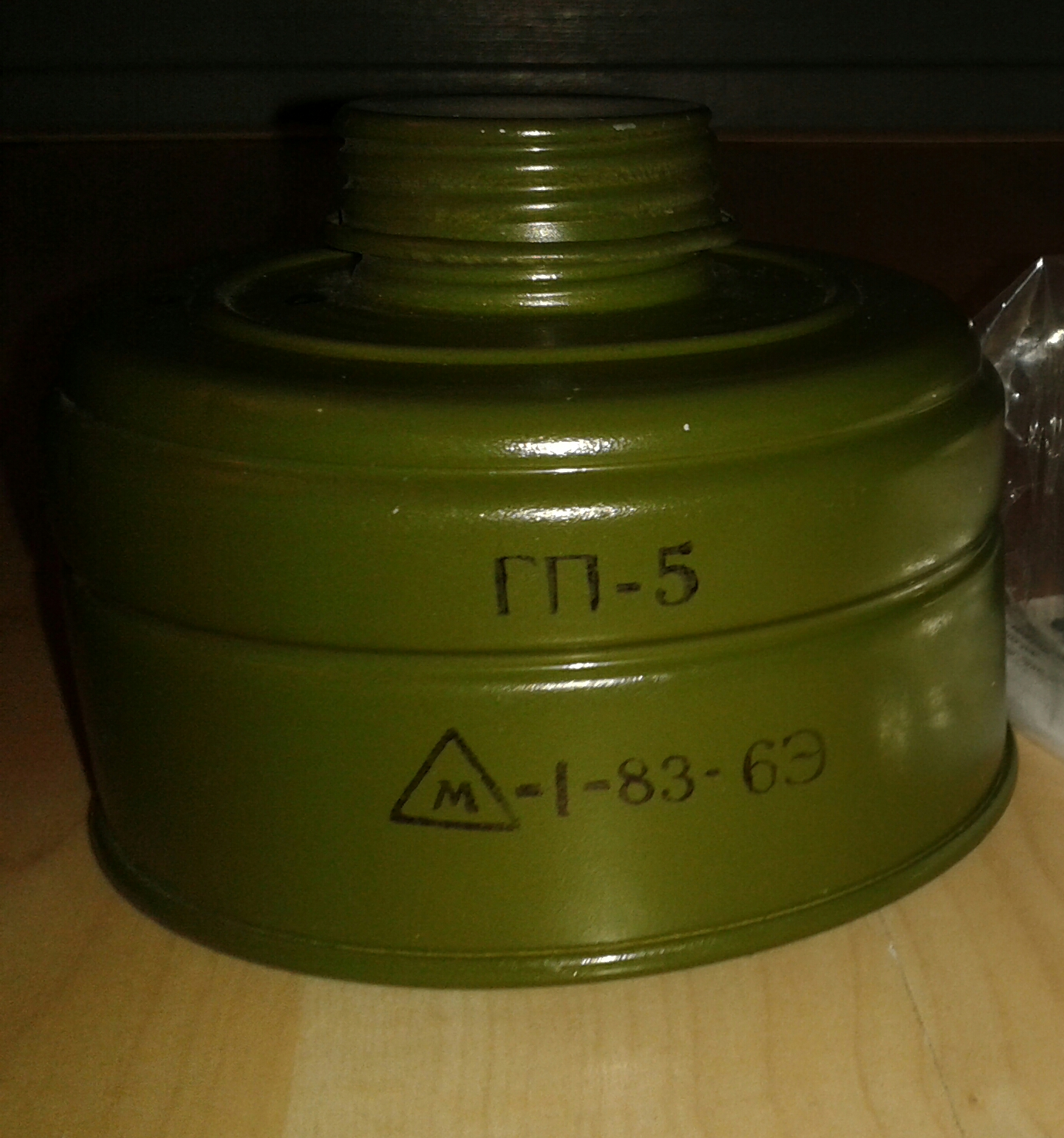
GP-5 filter containing asbestos.

== Design ==
The GP-5 weighs 1.09 kilograms (2.4 lb). It can operate in all weather conditions and withstand temperatures from −40 °C (−40 °F) to 114 °C (237 °F). The ShM-62 comes with sealed glass eyepieces.

The mask provides protection around the entire head and has a single metal ringed filter for breathing. The front part of the GP-5 provides the supply of air purified in the filter-absorbing box to the respiratory organs and protects the eyes and face from the ingress of toxic, radioactive substances and bacterial (biological) agents, as well as dust, smoke, and fog. The front part consists of a rubber body (helmet-mask) with fairings and a spectacle assembly with flat round glasses, and a valve box with inhalation and exhalation valves. It is completed with one-sided films that prevent fogging of glasses of the spectacle unit, it can also be equipped with insulating cuffs that prevent freezing of glasses of the spectacle unit at low temperatures.

The rubber of the front parts was produced in 5 sizes: 0 (0y), 1 (1y), 2 (2y), 3 (3y), 4 (4y). The Russian letter "y" [which translates to the letter U] in a circle next to the number indicating the size of the helmet mask means that this mask has thinner rubber, which is typical for later batches. The size is indicated by a number on the chin of the helmet mask. To select the required height of the helmet mask, one would need to measure the head along a closed line passing through the top of the head, cheeks, and chin. Measurements are rounded to 0.5 cm. With a measurement value of up to 63 cm - 0 height, from 63.5 to 65.5 cm - 1 height, from 66 to 68 cm - 2 height, from 68.5 to 70.5 cm - 3 height, from 71 cm and more - 4 height. On the rubber, helmet masks are also cast under the other markings: the first letter of the city of production and the year followed by dots indicating the quarter of the year, and the mold number (for example T86 ... F625).

The valve box of the front part serves to distribute the flows of inhaled and exhaled air. Inside the valve box, there are inhalation and two exhalation valves (main and additional). It has a standard 40/4 thread and does not initially have a corrugated tube.

The filtering-absorbing box (FPK) of the GP-5 civilian gas mask has the shape of a cylinder. The FPC body is made of aluminium. In its lower half, there is an antiaerosol filter, and in the upper half, there is an absorber (activated carbon). On the lid of the box, there is a screwed neck with a standard 40/4 thread for attaching the FPC to the front of the gas mask, and at the bottom, there is a round hole through which the inhaled air enters.

The gas mask bag is used to store and carry the gas mask. The gas mask bag is equipped with a shoulder strap with movable buckles for carrying the gas mask over the shoulder and a strap for attaching the gas mask to the body. The bag has two pockets: one flat with a partition for placing boxes with anti-fogging films and membranes and folding a waistband or IPP (individual dressing bag), and the other for an individual anti-chemical package IPP-8.

=== Specifications ===
- The mass of the gas mask as a whole is no more than 900 grams.
- The mass of the filter is no more than 250 grams.
- The mass of the front part of ShM-62 is 400-430 grams, and ShM-62U is 370-400 grams.
- The area of the field of view is not less than 42%.
- The overall dimensions of the gas mask when placed in a bag are 120x120x270 mm.
- Overall dimensions of the filter-absorbing box: diameter - 112.5 mm; height with cap — 80 mm.
- The resistance of the FPC to a constant airflow at a flow rate of 30 L/min is not more than 19 mm of water (186.2 Pa).
- The resistance of the front part to a constant airflow at a flow rate of 30 L/min: on inspiration - no more than 2 mm of water (19.6 Pa); on exhalation - no more than 10 mm of water (98 Pa).
- The resistance of the gas mask to a constant airflow at a flow rate of 30 L/min: on inspiration - no more than 21 mm of water (205.8 Pa); on exhalation - no more than 10 mm of water (98 Pa).
- FPC must be sealed at an overpressure of 100 mm Hg. When checking in a water bath for 8–10 seconds, no air bubbles should separate from the surface of the box;
- The front part must be airtight at a vacuum of 120 mm of water and must not give a drop in the liquid level along one knee of the pressure gauge by more than 18 mm for 1 minute.

FPC protective action time for hazardous chemicals at an airflow rate of 30 L/min.

- Hydrocyanic at a concentration of 5.0 mg/dm ^{3} - at least 18 minutes.
- Cyanogen at a concentration of 5.0 mg/dm ^{3} - at least 18 minutes.

The GP-5 does not protect against ammonia and its derivatives, organic vapors and gases with a boiling point of less than 65 °C (such as methane, ethane, acetylene, ethylene oxide, isobutane, etc.), carbon monoxide, and nitrogen oxides.

=== Lung cancer, mesothelioma and asbestosis link ===
There has been some debate as to whether or not the filters are dangerous for containing asbestos. In October 2013, Dixon Information found that the cotton layer of the filter contains 7.5 percent asbestos. All filters made after 1972 were supposed to not contain asbestos but activated charcoal instead. Although this may be the case for some filters, many factories chose not to put the money into updating the assembly line and continued to use asbestos. It is safer not to wear any filters fit for the GP-5.

=== Accessories ===
- The exhale valve part of ShM-62, ShM-62U, or ShMP (The ShMP is similar to the two previous masks, but cast from black rubber), ShM-66MU (for modifying the GP-5M gas mask, it can be made of gray or black rubber) – 1 piece.
- Filter (FPK) GP-5 – 1 piece.
- Gas mask sack – 1 bag.
- Single-sided anti-fogging films – 1 cartridge with the letters "NP" embossed on the lid, contains 6 pieces;
- 1 instruction manual.
- Spare membranes for the exhale valve (only for SHM-66MU) - 1 box with the letter "M" embossed on the lid contains 6 pieces.

The issued gas mask sack also contained a decontamination kit (typically either IPP-1 or IPP-8 model), bandages, a first aid kit, and anti-fogging lenses. Online, there is an additional GOST to NATO filter thread adaptor which is not officially part of the GP-5 kit issued by the Soviet Union, and it is disputed whether it is airtight and effective or not.

=== Packaging and storage ===
GP-5 kits were packed, transported, and stored in their original packaging – wooden boxes, which were sealed by the manufacturer. Each box contained 40 sets of gas masks, the sizes and numbers in the said crate were the following: Size 0 – 5 pcs., Size 1 – 12 pcs., Size 2 – 15 pcs., Size 3 – 7 pcs., Size 4 – 1 pcs. Each box contained a manual for the correct operation and use of the gas mask. In box No. 1 of each batch of gas masks, a form for the batch was inserted.

== Usage ==
Before use, the civilian gas mask GP-5 must be checked for serviceability and tightness. When inspecting the front part, one should make sure that the height of the helmet mask corresponds to the required one. Then determine its integrity by paying attention to the glasses of the spectacle assembly. After that, check the valve box, and the condition of the valves. They must not be warped, clogged, or torn. There should be no dents, rust, or punctures on the filter-absorbing box, and no damage to the neck. Attention is drawn to the fact that the "grains" of the absorber are not poured into the box. The assembly of the GP-5 civilian gas mask is carried out as follows: the front part is taken in the left hand by the valve box, the filter-absorbing box is screwed with the screwed neck into the branch pipe of the valve box of the front part with the right hand. Before putting on the new front part of the gas mask, it is necessary to wipe it outside and inside with a clean cloth slightly moistened with water and blow out the exhalation valves. If any damage is found in the gas mask, they are eliminated, if it is impossible to do this, the gas mask is replaced with a serviceable one. The checked gas mask is assembled in a bag: down is a filter-absorbing box, and on top - is the front part, which is not bent, only the head and side parts are slightly turned up to protect the glass of the spectacle assembly.

A gas mask issued for use can be in 3 positions:

- "travelling" position
- "ready" position
- "combat" position.

To bring the civilian gas mask GP-5 into the stowed position, it is necessary to put on a bag with a gas mask over the right shoulder so that it is on the left side, and the clasp is away from you, adjust the shoulder strap with the buckles so that the upper edge of the bag is at the level of the waist belt, check the reliability of the gas mask, fold the gas mask into the gas mask bag. If necessary, the gas mask can be attached to the belt with a ribbon. The gas mask is transferred to the “ready” position according to the signals “Air Raid” and “Threat of Radioactive Contamination”, that is, with an immediate threat of a nuclear, chemical, or bacteriological (biological) attack. In this case, it is necessary to move the gas mask forward, unfasten the valve of the gas mask bag, and fasten the gas mask to the body with a braid.

The mask tightly clings to the skin and scalp of the head, and so may be uncomfortable for those with all but the shortest of hair. The mask also will not create an airtight seal around the face if the individual wearing it has facial hair.

== Variants ==
The low cost and ease of manufacturing the GP-5 kit led to its adoption by several states, both for military and industrial use. In East Germany, the GP-5 was imported in numbers throughout the 1980s, with 1.8 million being imported between 1981 and 1988.

A later variation of the GP-5 is the PMG-2, which features a circular metal housing that protects a thin piece of plastic on the inside, which acts as a voice diaphragm ('voicemitter'). These masks also have circular cutouts in the rubber for the user's ears. The military version of the ShM-62, [The ShM-41] uses an identical facepiece but with an elongated filter housing and a hose that connects to a "Coffee can"-type filter. The filter remains supported in the mask's haversack while the mask is being worn. The ShM-62 and the ShM-41 were issued respectively to the civilian population and armed forces of the Soviet Union and its Warsaw Pact allies, among which they were given differing designations. The East German Armed Forces designated the military version the SchM-41M. Although it is unrelated to the GP-5 family of masks, a similar variant of the Russian "helmet-style" design with small eyepieces and a voice transmitter for those with specific needs relating to the use of optical equipment (i.e. officers - binoculars) was known as the SchMS.

== See also ==
- PMK gas mask
- GP-4u
- GP-7 gas mask
