= Wilhelm Falta =

Wilhelm Falta (6 May 1875 – 15 July 1950) was a Bohemian physician who was a pioneer of diabetes research. He was among the first to recognize that decreased sensitivity to insulin, or insulin resistance, separated one form of diabetes from another.

Falta was born at Karlovy Vary, Bohemia to goldsmith Wilhelm and his wife Berta Seiffert. He was educated at Prague and Strassburg, receiving a degree in medicine in 1900. He then worked with Karl Hugo Huppert in Prague University and worked at the Basel Hospital with Friedrich von Müller and Wilhelm His. He then worked at Vienna along with Carl von Noorden and Karel Frederik Wenckebach. It was here that he began to examine metabolic diseases like diabetes mellitus. Falta worked as a physician at the Kaiserin-Elisabeth-Spital where he established a laboratory that was destroyed during World War II. He then worked at the Steinhof hospital for a while. He was an editor for the Wiener Archivs für Innere Medizin.
