= Black Veil Respirator =

British gas mask

The Black Veil Respirator was an early British gas mask designed by John Scott Haldane and introduced in May 1915.

== History ==
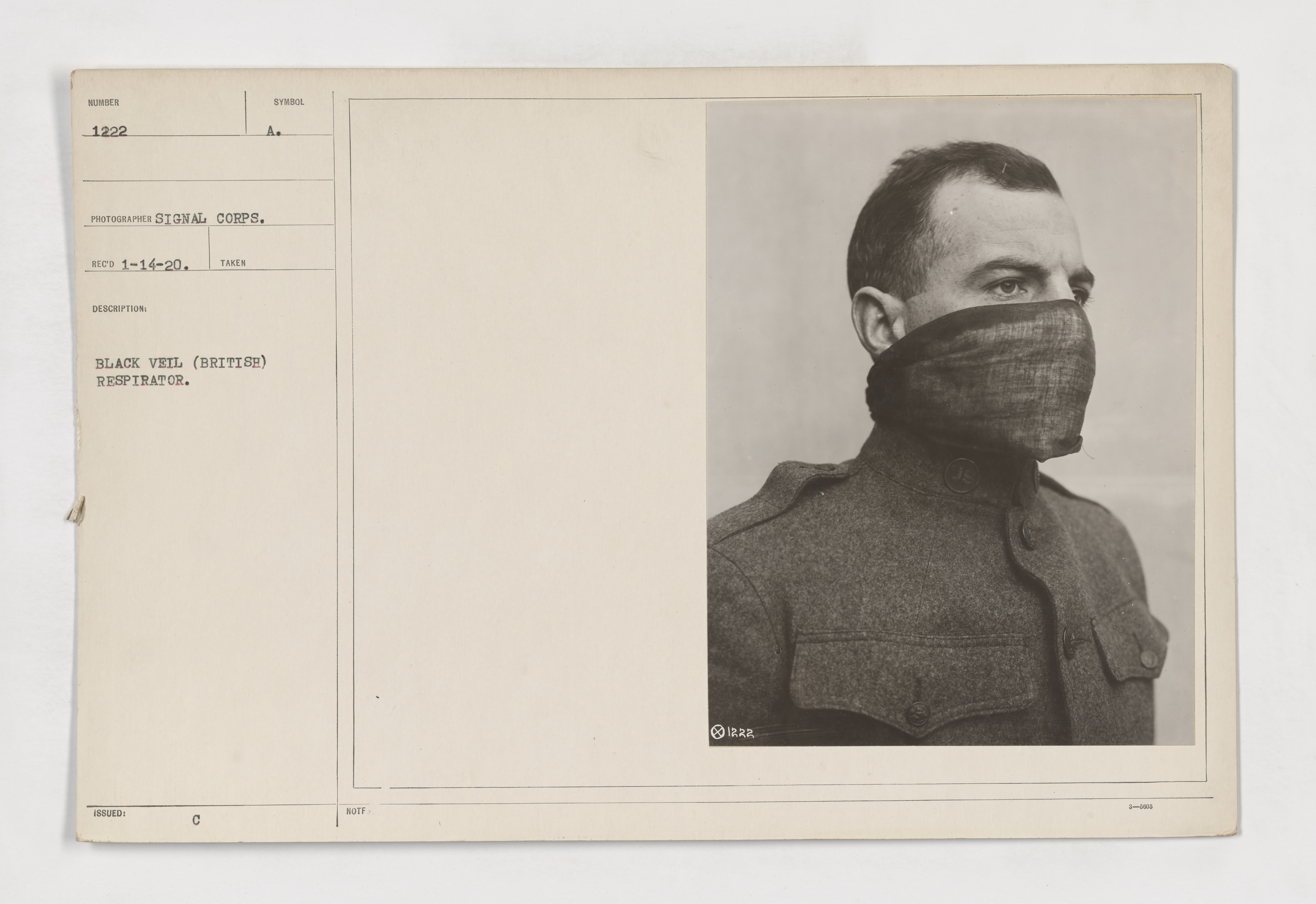
The Black Veil Respirator

The German army used chlorine as a poison gas for the first time against Allied troops at the Second Battle of Ypres on 22 April 1915. As an immediate response, the British began issuing cotton wool wrapped in muslin to its troops by 3 May. This was followed by the Black Veil Respirator, invented by John Scott Haldane. The Black Veil was a cotton pad soaked in an absorbent solution which was secured over the mouth using black cotton veiling. The mask was treated in a solution of sodium hyposulphate, sodium carbonate, glycerine and water. The solution retained sufficient moisture so that it was unnecessary to dip the mask in a solution prior to use, so long as it was stored in its purpose-built waterproof satchel. The veiling could be drawn up to cover the eyes, providing some protection against lachrymatory agents; however, the mask itself still only provided limited protection against chlorine gas.

First issued on 20 May 1915, the Black Veil had a pouch for the pad to sit in and a string to hold the mask in to the face, and was thus an improvement to the hand-held cloth. However, it was of fragile construction, required training to use effectively, and largely immobilized its wearers because they were concerned about the mask coming loose. The Black Veil Respirator was soon replaced by the British Smoke Hood, an over the head canvas hood treated with chlorine-absorbing chemicals, invented by Cluny MacPherson. Following the introduction of the British Smoke Hood, the Black Veil was relegated to an emergency backup.

== Bibliography ==
- Cook, Tim (1998). "Through Clouded Eyes:Gas Masks and the Canadian Corps i n the First World War". Material History Review. 47 (Spring ed.): 4–18.
- Spiers, Edward M. (2017), "The Gas War, 1915-1918: If not a War Winner, Hardly a Failure.", in Friedrich, Bretislav; Hoffmann, Dieter; Renn, Jürgen; Schmaltz, Florian; Wolf, Martin (eds.), One Hundred Years of Chemical Warfare: Research, Deployment, Consequences, Springer, pp. 153–178, ISBN 978-3319516639
- Wetherell, Anthony; Mathers, George (2007), "Respiratory Protection", in Marrs, Timothy; Maynard, Robert; Sidell, Frederick (eds.), Chemical Warfare Agents: Toxicology and Treatment, New York: Wiley, pp. 157–174, ISBN 978-0470013595
