= John Scott Haldane =

British physiologist and researcher (1860–1936)

John Scott Haldane FRS
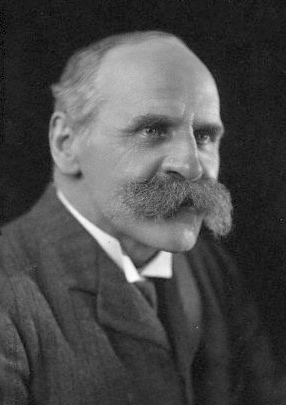
- Born: 2 May 1860; Edinburgh, Scotland, United Kingdom of Great Britain and Ireland
- Died: 14 March 1936 (aged 75); Oxford, England, United Kingdom
- Education: Edinburgh Academy; University of Edinburgh; Friedrich Schiller University of Jena
- Known for: Black Veil Respirator; Haldane effect Haldane's decompression model
- Spouse: Louisa Kathleen Coutts Trotter
- Children: J. B. S. Haldane; Naomi Mitchison
- Awards: Many honorary degrees
- Scientific career
- Fields: Physiology, medicine
- Workplaces: University of Glasgow; New College, Oxford; University of Birmingham

John Scott Haldane CH FRS (/ˈhɔːldeɪn/; 2 May 1860 – 14/15 March 1936) was a Scottish physician physiologist and philosopher famous for his often-dangerous self-experimentation that led to many important discoveries about the human body and the nature of gases. He also experimented on his son, the celebrated and polymathic biologist J. B. S. Haldane, even when he was quite young. Haldane locked himself in sealed chambers breathing potentially lethal cocktails of gases while recording their effect on his mind and body.

Haldane visited the scenes of many mining disasters and investigated their causes. When the Germans used poison gas in World War I, Haldane went to the front at the request of Lord Kitchener and attempted to identify the gases being used. One outcome of this was his invention of a respirator, known as the black veil.

Haldane's investigations into decompression sickness resulted in the concept of staged decompression, and the first reasonably reliable decompression tables, and his mathematical model is still used in highly modified forms for computing decompression schedules.

== Background and family ==
Haldane was born in Edinburgh to Robert Haldane, whose father was Scottish evangelist James Alexander Haldane, and Mary Elizabeth Burdon-Sanderson, daughter of Richard Burdon-Sanderson and the granddaughter of Sir Thomas Burdon. His maternal uncle was the physiologist John Scott Burdon-Sanderson. He was the brother of Elizabeth Haldane, William Haldane and Richard Haldane, 1st Viscount Haldane.

On 12 December 1891 John Scott Haldane married Louisa Kathleen Coutts Trotter (1863–1961), daughter of Coutts Trotter FRGS and Harriet Augusta Keatinge. The couple had two children, the biologist J.B.S. 'Jack' Haldane (born in 1892) and the writer Naomi Mitchison (born in 1897). After the birth of Naomi, the family lived for a time in a house at 10 Randolph Crescent in Edinburgh's New Town before returning to Oxford. They spent summers at the Haldane family's country house at Cloan in Perthshire.

John Scott Haldane's nephew was the New Zealand doctor and public health administrator Robert Haldane Makgill.

== Education ==
Haldane attended Edinburgh Academy, Edinburgh University and the Friedrich Schiller University of Jena. He graduated in medicine from Edinburgh University Medical School in 1884, after which he was a Demonstrator at University College, Dundee. From 1907 to 1913 he was a Reader in Physiology at Oxford University where his uncle, John Burdon-Sanderson, was Waynflete Professor of Physiology.

Haldane also published his philosophical ideas about the true significance of biology.

== Career ==
Haldane was Gifford Lecturer in the University of Glasgow, Fellow of New College, Oxford, from October 1901, and Honorary Professor of the University of Birmingham. Haldane received numerous honorary degrees. He was also President of the English Institution of Mining Engineers, a Member of the Order of the Companions of Honour, a Fellow of the Royal Society, a member of the Royal College of Physicians and of the Royal Society of Medicine.

Haldane became a Fellow of the Royal Society in 1897, was a Royal Medallist of the Society in 1916, was appointed Member of the Order of the Companions of Honour in the 1928 Birthday Honours for work on industrial disease, and was a Copley Medallist in 1934.

== Death ==
Haldane died in Oxford at midnight on the night of 14 March/15 March 1936 of pneumonia. He had just returned from a trip he had undertaken to investigate cases of heat stroke in the oil refineries in Persia.

Sir Henry Newbolt wrote a poem called "For J. S. Haldane", published in his anthology A Perpetual Memory and other Poems in 1939.

== Accomplishments ==
=== Respiration and anaesthesia ===
Haldane was an international authority on ether and respiration and the inventor of the Black Veil Respirator, an early gas mask, during World War I.

He was also an authority on the effects of pulmonary diseases, such as silicosis caused by inhaling silica dust. After being forced out of combatting poison gases in World War I, through alleged German sympathies, he shifted into working with victims of gas warfare and developed oxygen treatment including the oxygen tent.

Haldane helped determine the regulation of breathing, and discovered the Haldane effect in haemoglobin: Deoxygenated haemoglobin has a greater affinity for carbon dioxide than oxygenated haemoglobin, so the release of oxygen from the capillaries to the tissues facilitates the removal of carbon dioxide in those capillaries, and in the lung capillaries the high oxygenation of the blood promotes the release of carbon dioxide to the plasma, which allows it to diffuse into the alveolar gas.

Haldane was the founder of The Journal of Hygiene.

=== Diving physiology ===
In 1907 Haldane had a decompression chamber made at the Lister Institute for his experimental work which was to help make underwater diving safer and produced the first decompression tables using his concept of stage decompression after extensive experiments with animals, and with divers in Scottish deep-water lochs. The decompression experiments examined the depth and pressure exposure, duration, and the pattern of decompression. Initial experiments used rabbits, guinea pigs, rats and mice, but the difficulty of detecting symptoms in the smaller animals led to the choice of goats, which were the largest animals easily available that were conveniently manageable in the available facilities.

The mathematical model on which these tables were based, though considerably revised and modified, remains a widely accepted method of decompressing divers from non-saturation exposures. In 1908, Haldane published the findings with A. E. Boycott and G. C. C. Damant in the paper "Prevention of Compressed-Air Illness" in the Journal of Hygiene. He also found by experiment that part of the cause for divers losing consciousness while working at around 120 feet in standard helmets was a buildup of carbon dioxide in the helmet caused by insufficient ventilation, and established a minimum flow rate of 1.5 cubic feet (42 L) per minute at ambient pressure.

=== Coal and other mining incidents ===
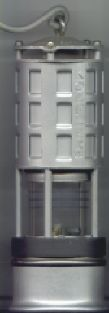
Modern flame safety lamp used in mines, manufactured by Koehler

He investigated the principle of action of many different gases. He investigated numerous mine disasters, especially the toxic gases which killed most miners after firedamp and coal dust explosions. The toxic mixtures of gases found in mines included afterdamp, blackdamp and whitedamp. His description of the way a flame safety lamp can be used to detect firedamp by the increase in height of the flame, and chokedamp by the dying of the flame, is a classic exposition in his textbook, Respiration. Although electronic gas detectors are now used widely in all coal mines, flame lamps are still used extensively for their ease and simplicity of operation. He identified carbon monoxide as the lethal constituent of afterdamp, the gas created by combustion, after examining many bodies of miners killed in pit explosions. Their skin was coloured cherry-pink from carboxyhaemoglobin, the stable compound formed in the blood by reaction with the gas. It effectively displaces oxygen, and so the victim dies of asphyxia. As a result of his research, he was able to design respirators for rescue workers. He tested the effect of carbon monoxide on his own body in a closed chamber, describing the results of his slow poisoning.

In the late 1890s, Haldane introduced the use of small animals for miners to detect dangerous levels of carbon monoxide underground, either white mice or canaries. With a faster metabolism, they showed the effects of poisoning before gas levels became critical for the workers, and so gave an early warning of the problem. The canary in British pits was replaced in 1986 by the electronic gas detector. Electronic gas detectors rely on a catalytic chip which can be poisoned by atmospheric impurities.

=== Pike's Peak expedition ===
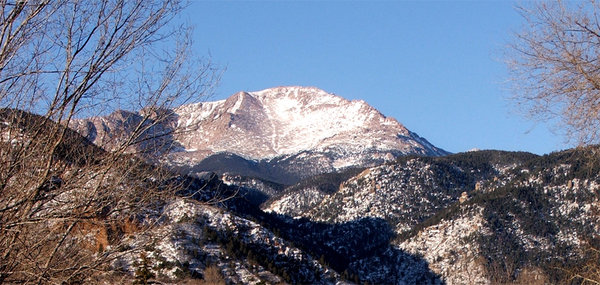
Pike's Peak as seen from within Manitou Springs, Colorado.

Haldane pioneered the study of the reaction of the body to low air pressures, such as that experienced at high altitudes. He led an expedition to Pike's Peak in 1911, which examined the effect of low atmospheric pressure on respiration. Since then, Pike's Peak has continued to be a site of research into respiration.

=== Sewer gas ===
In addition to his work on mine atmospheres, he investigated the air in enclosed spaces such as wells and sewers. One surprising result of his analysis of the air in the sewers beneath the House of Commons was to show that the level of bacterial contamination was relatively low. During this research, he investigated fatalities of workmen in a sewer, and showed that hydrogen sulfide gas poisoning was the cause of death.

== Bibliography ==
=== Writings ===
- J. S. Haldane, The Philosophical Basis of Biology: Donnellan Lectures, University of Dublin, 1930, Hodder and Stoughton Limited (1931).
- J. S. Haldane and JG Priestley, Respiration, 2nd Ed, Oxford University Press (1935).
- J. S. Haldane, The Philosophy of a Biologist, 2nd Ed, Oxford University Press (1936).

== See also ==
- Decompression (diving) – Pressure reduction and its effects during ascent from depth
- Haldane's decompression model – Decompression model developed by John Scott Haldane
