= Chemical weapons in World War I =

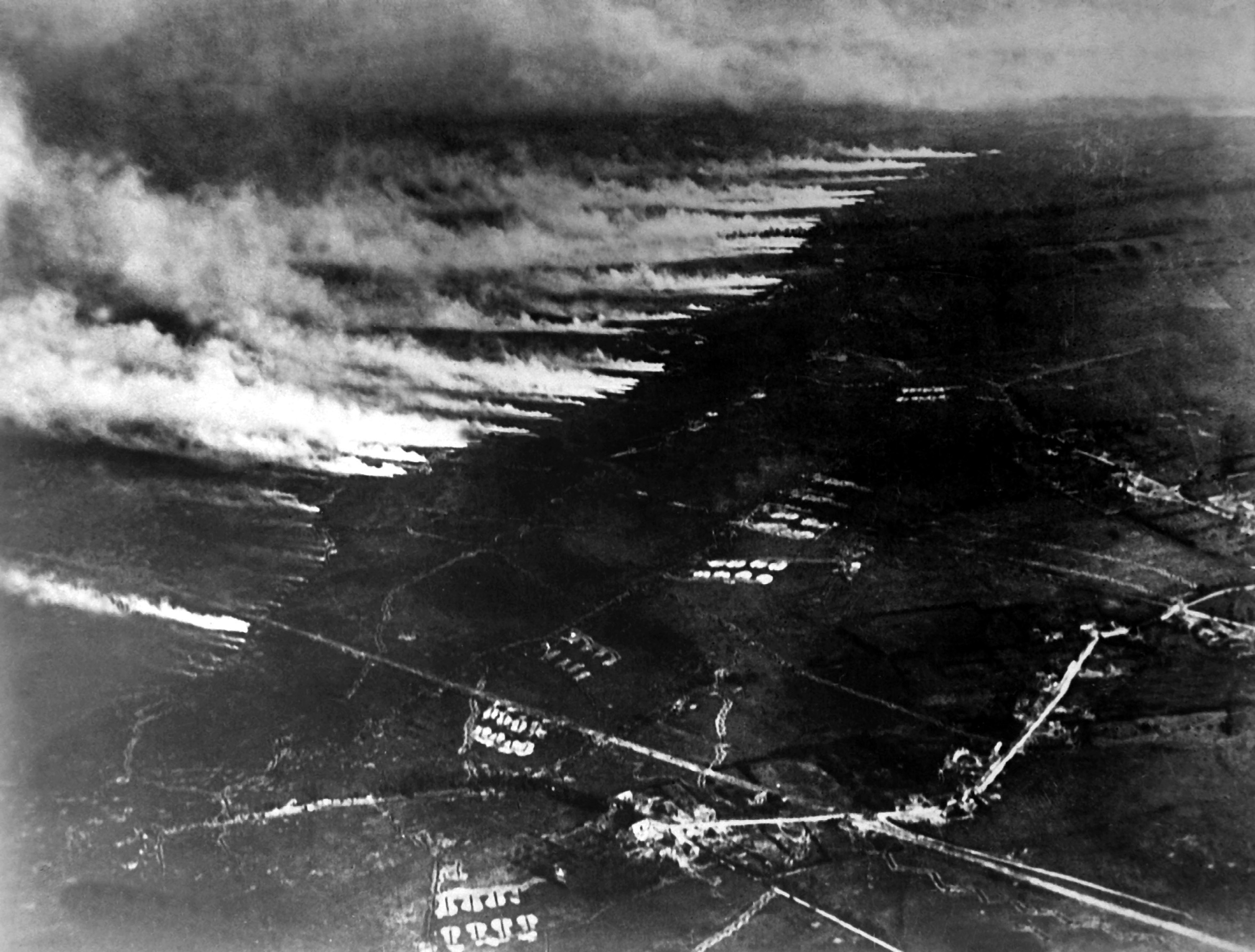
A French gas attack on German trenches in Flanders, Belgium (1917).

Chemical warfare dates back thousands of years, but the first large-scale use of chemical weapons was during World War I. Austria-Hungary, France, Germany, the United Kingdom, and the United States used chemical weapons on the battlefield. They were primarily used to demoralize, injure, and kill entrenched defenders, against whom the indiscriminate and generally very slow-moving or static nature of gas clouds would be most effective. The types of weapons employed ranged from disabling chemicals, such as tear gas, to lethal agents like chlorine, phosgene, and mustard gas. In survivors, gas attacks caused medical problems and a strong psychological impact. This chemical warfare was a major component of the first global war and first total war of the 20th century.

Estimates go up to about 90,000 fatalities and a total of about 1.3 million casualties. However, this amounts to only 3–3.5% of overall casualties, and gas was unlike most other weapons of the period because it was possible to develop countermeasures, such as gas masks. In the later stages of the war, as the use of gas increased, its overall effectiveness diminished.

The widespread use of these agents, and wartime advances in the composition of high explosives, gave rise to an occasionally expressed view of World War I as "the chemist's war" and also the era where weapons of mass destruction were created.

The use of poison gas by all major belligerents throughout World War I constituted war crimes as its use violated the 1899 Hague Declaration Concerning Asphyxiating Gases and the 1907 Hague Convention on Land Warfare, which prohibited the use of "poison or poisoned weapons" in warfare. After the war, the 1925 Geneva Protocol was signed by all major powers, however it only prohibited state-to-state chemical warfare, not internal use or stockpiling, and Japan and the United States did not ratify it until the 1970s. In World War II, chemical weapons were used by Germany during the Holocaust and by Japan against China. However, extensive battlefield use was not seen outside China, i.e. in Europe or the Pacific, due to Western Allied stockpiles, and a stronger and transnational repugnance for poison gases following World War I.

== Use of poison gas ==
=== 1914: Tear gas ===
The most frequently used chemicals during World War I were tear-inducing irritants rather than fatal or disabling poison. During World War I, the French Army was the first to employ tear gas, using 26 mm grenades filled with ethyl bromoacetate in August 1914. The small quantities of gas delivered, roughly 19 cm^{3} (1.2 cu in) per cartridge, were not even detected by the Germans. The stocks were rapidly consumed and by November a new order was placed by the French military. As bromine was scarce among the Entente allies, the active ingredient was changed to chloroacetone.

In October 1914, German troops fired fragmentation shells filled with a chemical irritant against British positions at Neuve Chapelle; the concentration achieved was so small that it too was barely noticed. None of the combatants considered the use of tear gas to be in conflict with the Hague Treaty of 1899, which specifically prohibited the launching of projectiles containing asphyxiating or poisonous gas.

=== 1915: Large-scale use and lethal gases ===
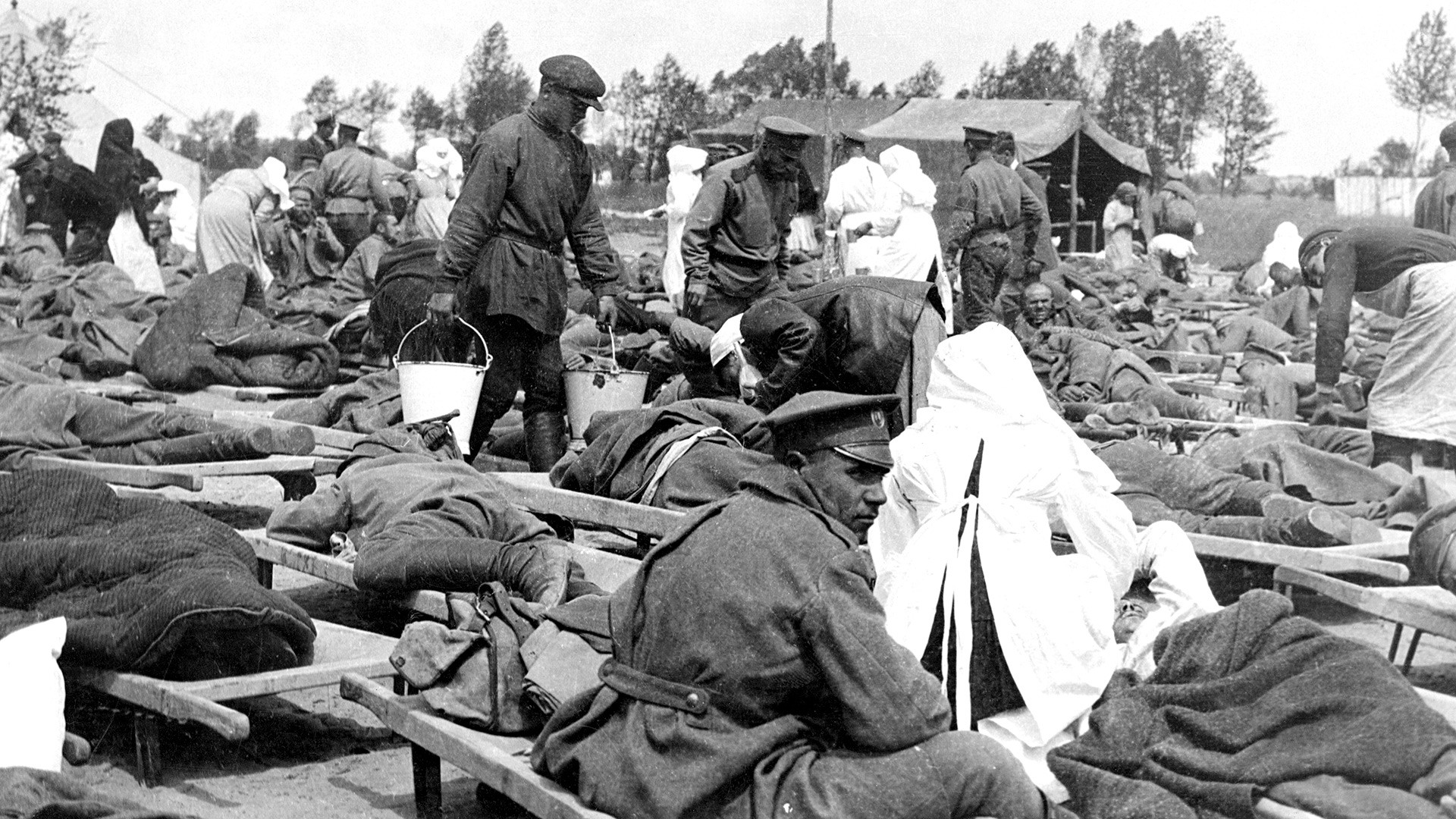
Russian Red Cross nurses tend to gassed Russians brought from the front lines, 1915

The first instance of large-scale use of gas as a weapon was on 31 January 1915, when Germany fired 18,000 artillery shells containing liquid xylyl bromide tear gas on Russian positions on the Rawka River, west of Warsaw during the Battle of Bolimov. Instead of vaporizing, the chemical froze and failed to have the desired effect.

The first killing agent was chlorine, used by the German Army. Chlorine is a powerful irritant that can inflict damage to the eyes, nose, throat and lungs. At high concentrations and prolonged exposure it can cause death by asphyxiation. German chemical companies BASF, Hoechst and Bayer (which formed the IG Farben conglomerate in 1925) had been making chlorine as a by-product of their dye manufacturing. In cooperation with Fritz Haber of the Kaiser Wilhelm Institute for Chemistry in Berlin, they began developing methods of discharging chlorine gas against enemy trenches.

It may appear from a feldpost letter of Major Karl von Zingler that the first chlorine gas attack by German forces took place before 2 January 1915: "In other war theatres it does not go better and it has been said that our Chlorine is very effective. 140 English officers have been killed. This is a horrible weapon ...". This letter must be discounted as evidence for early German use of chlorine, however, because the date "2 January 1915" may have been hastily scribbled instead of the intended "2 January 1916," the sort of common typographical error that is often made at the beginning of a new year. The deaths of so many English officers from gas at this time would certainly have been met with outrage, but a recent, extensive study of British reactions to chemical warfare says nothing of this supposed attack. Perhaps this letter was referring to the chlorine-phosgene attack on British troops at Wieltje near Ypres, on 19 December 1915 (see below).

By 22 April 1915, the German Army had 167 tons of chlorine deployed in 5,730 cylinders from Langemark-Poelkapelle, north of Ypres. At 17:30, in a slight easterly breeze, the liquid chlorine was siphoned from the tanks, producing gas which formed a grey-green cloud that drifted across positions held by troops of the 45th Infantry Division (France), specifically the 1st Tirailleurs and the 2nd Zouaves from Algeria. Faced with an unfamiliar threat these troops broke ranks, abandoning their trenches and creating an 8,000-yard (7.3 km) gap in the Allied line. The German infantry were also wary of the gas and, lacking reinforcements, failed to exploit the break before the 1st Canadian Division and assorted French troops reformed the line in scattered, hastily prepared positions 1,000–3,000 yards (910–2,740 m) apart. The Entente governments claimed the attack was a flagrant violation of international law but Germany argued that the Hague treaty had only banned chemical shells, rather than the use of gas projectors.

In what became the Second Battle of Ypres, the Germans used gas on three more occasions; on 24 April against the 1st Canadian Division, on 2 May near Mouse Trap Farm and on 5 May against the British at Hill 60. The British Official History stated that at Hill 60, "90 men died from gas poisoning in the trenches or before they could be got to a dressing station; of the 207 brought to the nearest dressing stations, 46 died almost immediately and 12 after long suffering."

On 6 August, German troops under Field Marshal Paul von Hindenburg used chlorine gas against Russian troops defending Osowiec Fortress. Surviving defenders drove back the attack and retained the fortress. The event would later be called the Attack of the Dead Men.

Germany used chemical weapons on the Eastern Front in an attack at Rawka (river), west of Warsaw. The Russian Army took 9,000 casualties, with more than 1,000 fatalities. In response, the artillery branch of the Russian Army organised a commission to study the delivery of poison gas in shells.

==== Effectiveness and countermeasures ====
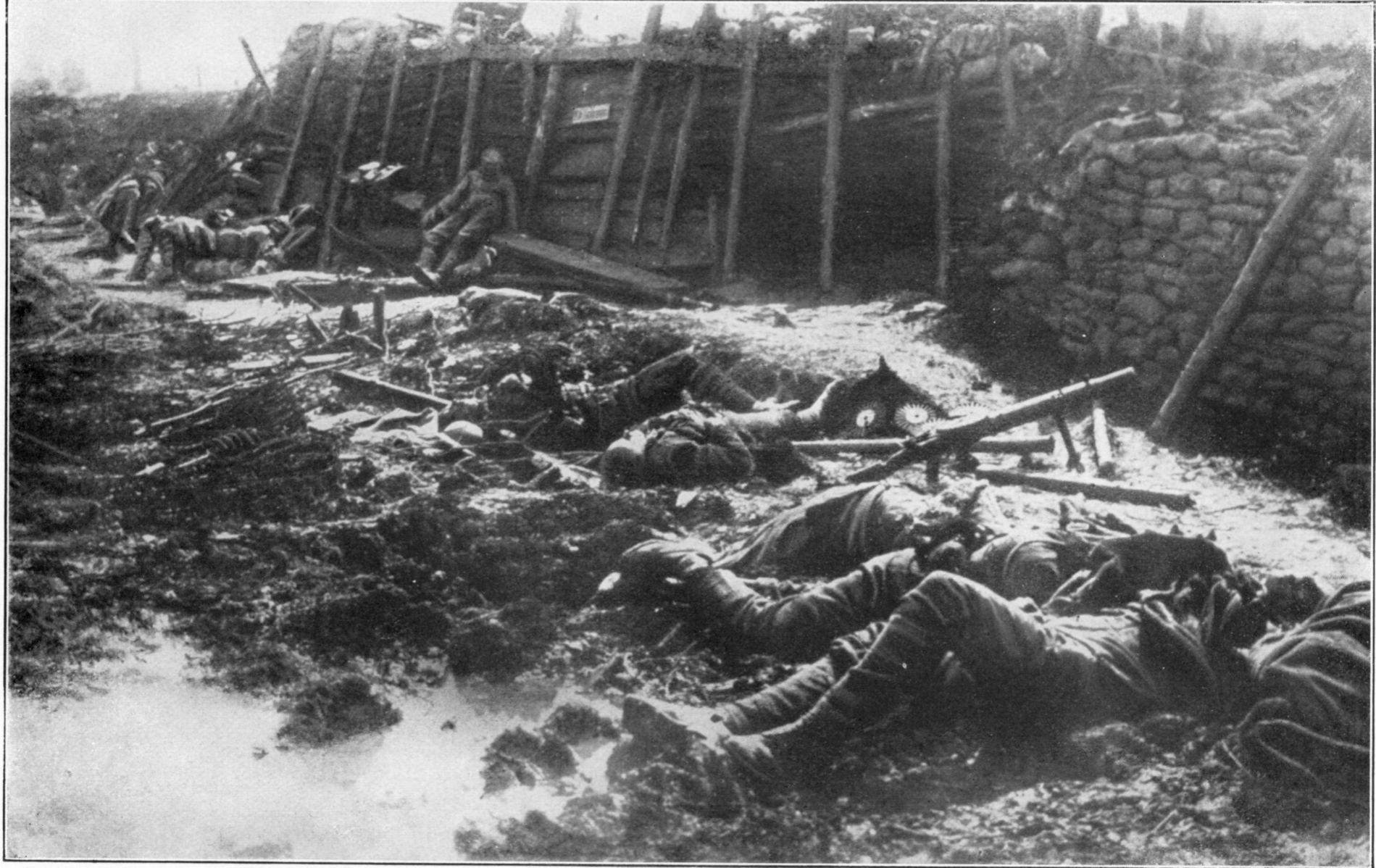
British emplacement after German gas attack (probably phosgene)

It quickly became evident that the men who stayed in their places suffered less than those who ran away, as any movement worsened the effects of the gas, and that those who stood up on the fire step suffered less—indeed they often escaped any serious effects—than those who lay down or sat at the bottom of a trench. Men who stood on the parapet suffered least, as the gas was denser near the ground. The worst sufferers were the wounded lying on the ground, or on stretchers, and the men who moved back with the cloud. Chlorine was less effective as a weapon than the Germans had hoped, particularly as soon as simple countermeasures were introduced. The gas produced a visible greenish cloud and strong odour, making it easy to detect. It was water-soluble, so the simple expedient of covering the mouth and nose with a damp cloth was effective at reducing the effect of the gas. It was thought to be even more effective to use urine rather than water, as it was known at the time that chlorine reacted with urea (present in urine) to form dichloro urea.

Chlorine required a concentration of 1,000 parts per million to be fatal, destroying tissue in the lungs, likely through the formation of hypochlorous and hydrochloric acids when dissolved in the water in the lungs. Despite its limitations, chlorine was an effective psychological weapon—the sight of an oncoming cloud of the gas was a continual source of dread for the infantry.

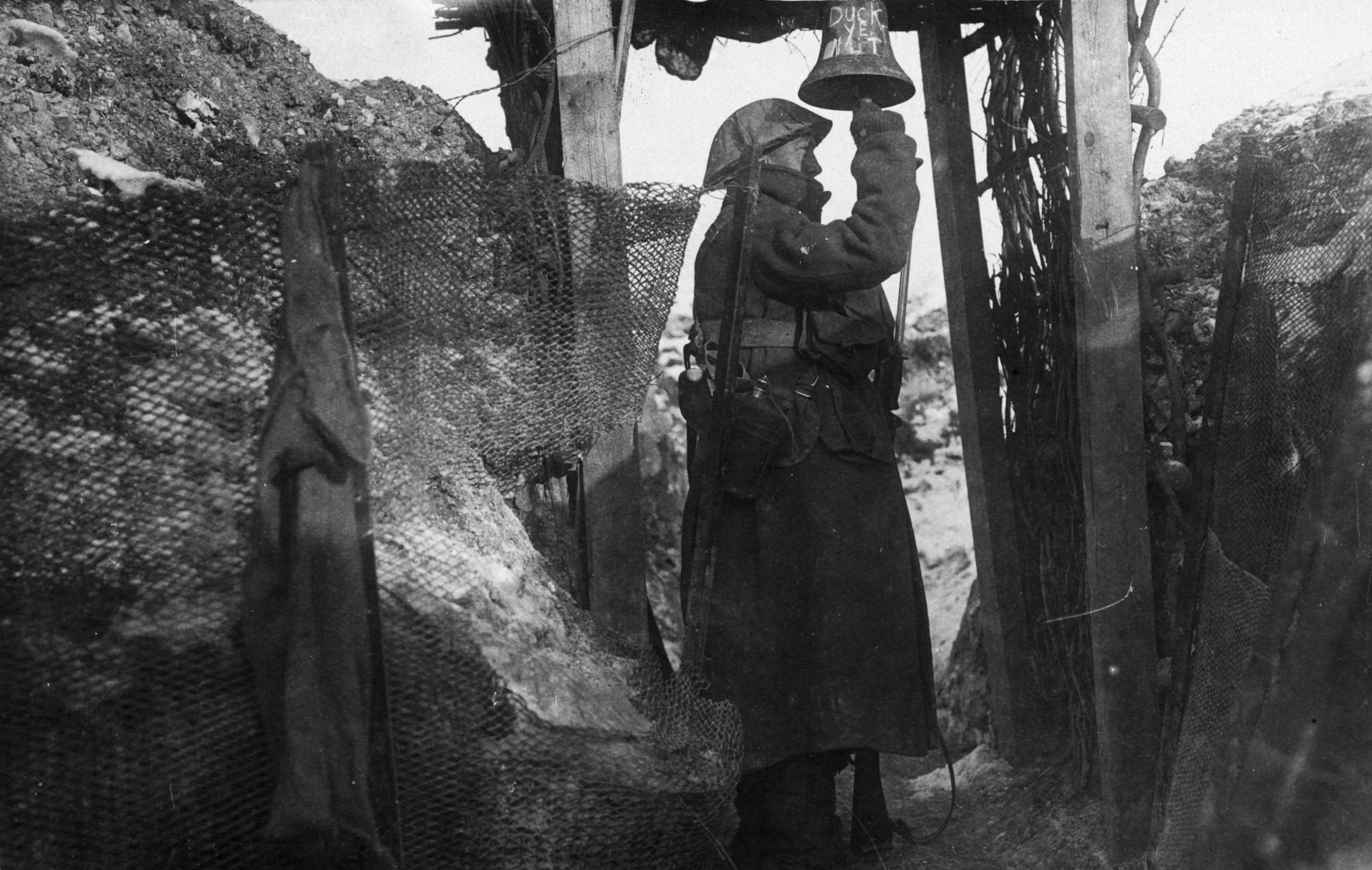
A bell used as a gas alarm, December 1916.

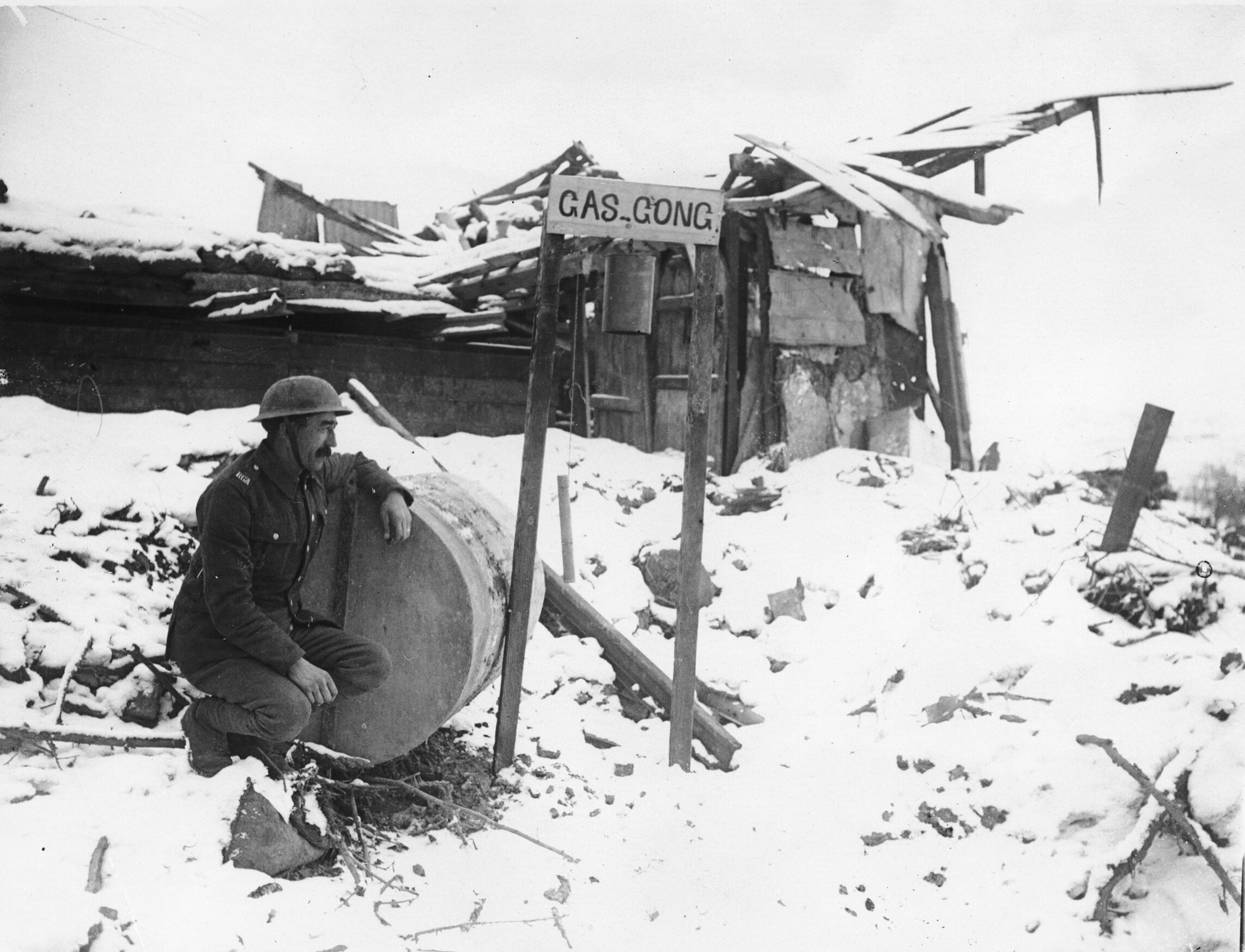
A sentry stands watch next to a "gas gong".

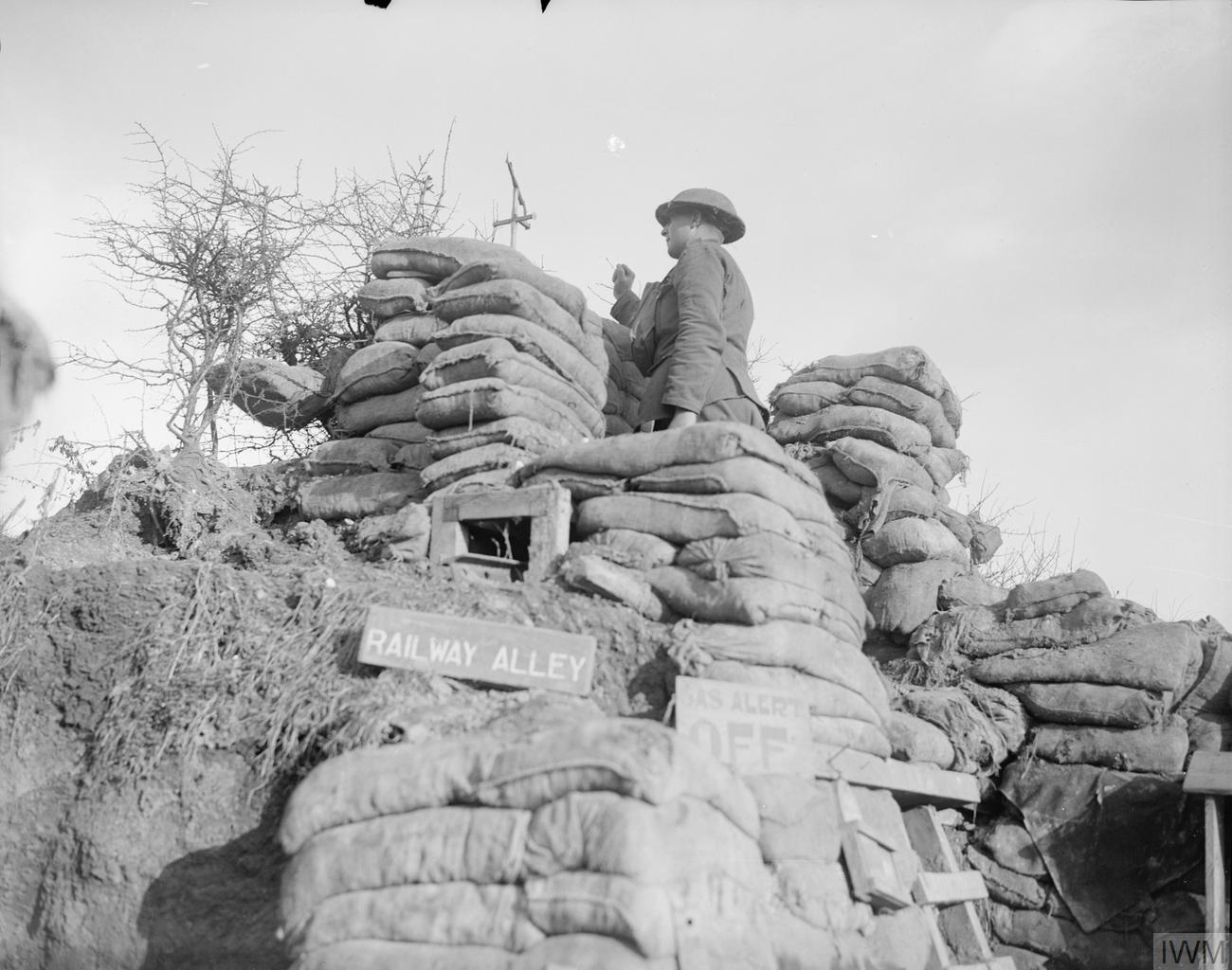
A gas sentry of the York and Lancaster Regiment, in his lookout position in a trench near Cambrin, 6 February 1918. Note the weather vane indicating wind direction.

Countermeasures were quickly introduced in response to the use of chlorine. The Germans issued their troops with small gauze pads filled with cotton waste, and bottles of a bicarbonate solution with which to dampen the pads. Immediately following the use of chlorine gas by the Germans, instructions were sent to British and French troops to hold wet handkerchiefs or cloths over their mouths. Simple pad respirators similar to those issued to German troops were soon proposed by Lieutenant-Colonel N. C. Ferguson, the Assistant Director Medical Services of the 28th Division. These pads were intended to be used damp, preferably dipped into a solution of bicarbonate kept in buckets for that purpose; other liquids were also used. Because such pads could not be expected to arrive at the front for several days, army divisions set about making them for themselves. Locally available muslin, flannel and gauze were used, officers were sent to Paris to buy more and local French women were employed making up rudimentary pads with string ties. Other units used lint bandages manufactured in the convent at Poperinge. Pad respirators were sent up with rations to British troops in the line as early as the evening of 24 April.

In Britain the Daily Mail newspaper encouraged women to manufacture cotton pads, and within one month a variety of pad respirators were available to British and French troops, along with motoring goggles to protect the eyes. The response was enormous and a million gas masks were produced in a day. The Mail's design was useless when dry and caused suffocation when wet—the respirator was responsible for the deaths of scores of men. By 6 July 1915, the entire British army was equipped with the more effective "smoke helmet" designed by Major Cluny MacPherson, Newfoundland Regiment, which was a flannel bag with a celluloid window, which entirely covered the head. The race was then on between the introduction of new and more effective poison gases and the production of effective countermeasures, which marked gas warfare until the armistice in November 1918.

==== British gas attacks ====
The British expressed outrage at Germany's use of poison gas at Ypres and responded by developing their own gas warfare capability. The commander of II Corps, Lieutenant General Sir Charles Fergusson, said of gas:

It is a cowardly form of warfare which does not commend itself to me or other English soldiers ... We cannot win this war unless we kill or incapacitate more of our enemies than they do of us, and if this can only be done by our copying the enemy in his choice of weapons, we must not refuse to do so.

The first use of gas by the British was at the Battle of Loos, 25 September 1915, but the attempt was a disaster. Chlorine, codenamed Red Star, was the agent to be used (140 tons arrayed in 5,100 cylinders), and the attack was dependent on a favourable wind. On this occasion the wind proved fickle, and the gas either lingered in no man's land or, in places, blew back on the British trenches. This was compounded when the gas could not be released from all the British canisters because the wrong turning keys were sent with them. Subsequent retaliatory German shelling hit some of those unused full cylinders, releasing gas among the British troops. Exacerbating the situation were the primitive flannel gas masks distributed to the British. The masks got hot, and the small eye-pieces misted over, reducing visibility. Some of the troops lifted the masks to get fresh air, causing them to be gassed.

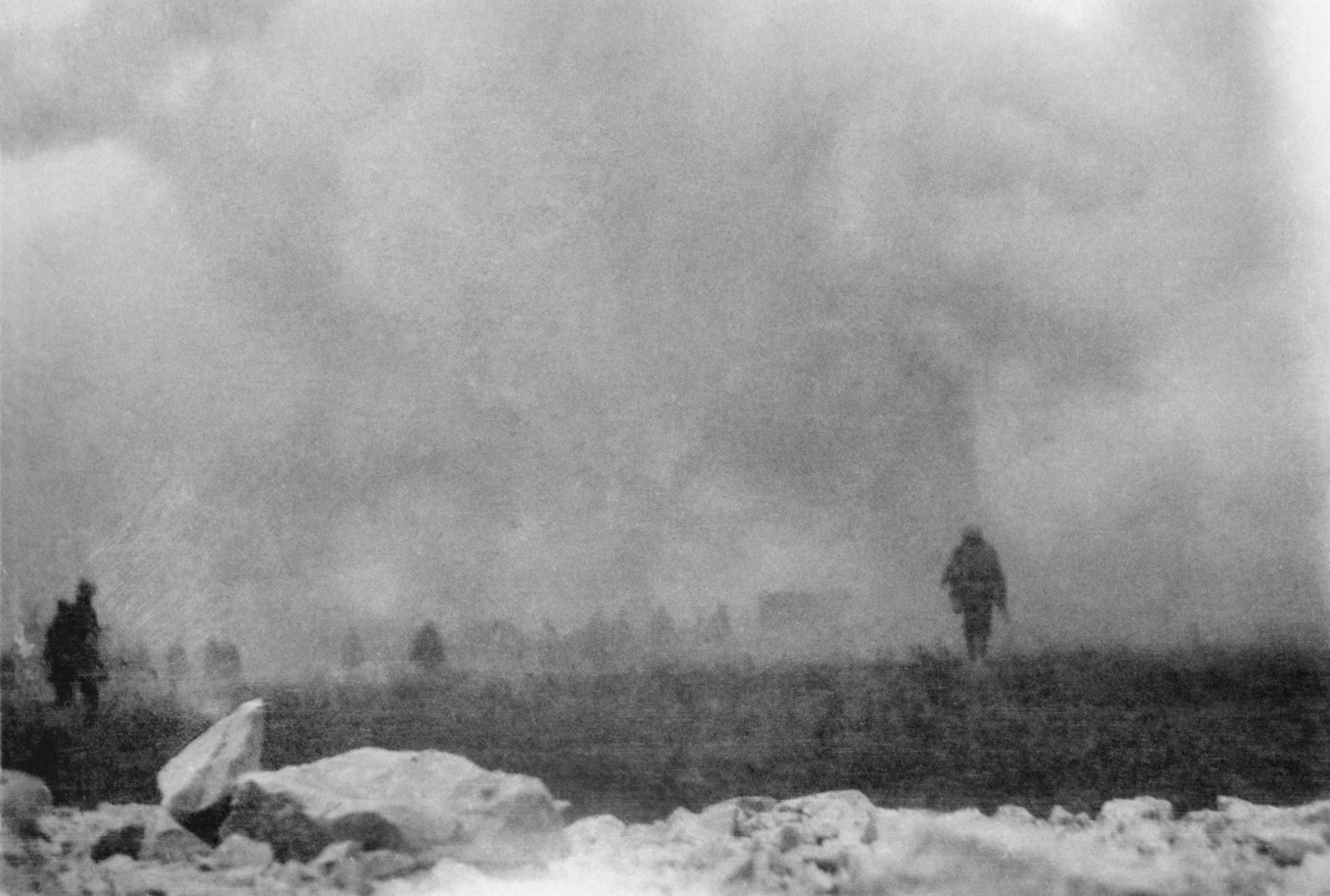
British infantry advancing through gas at Loos, 25 September 1915

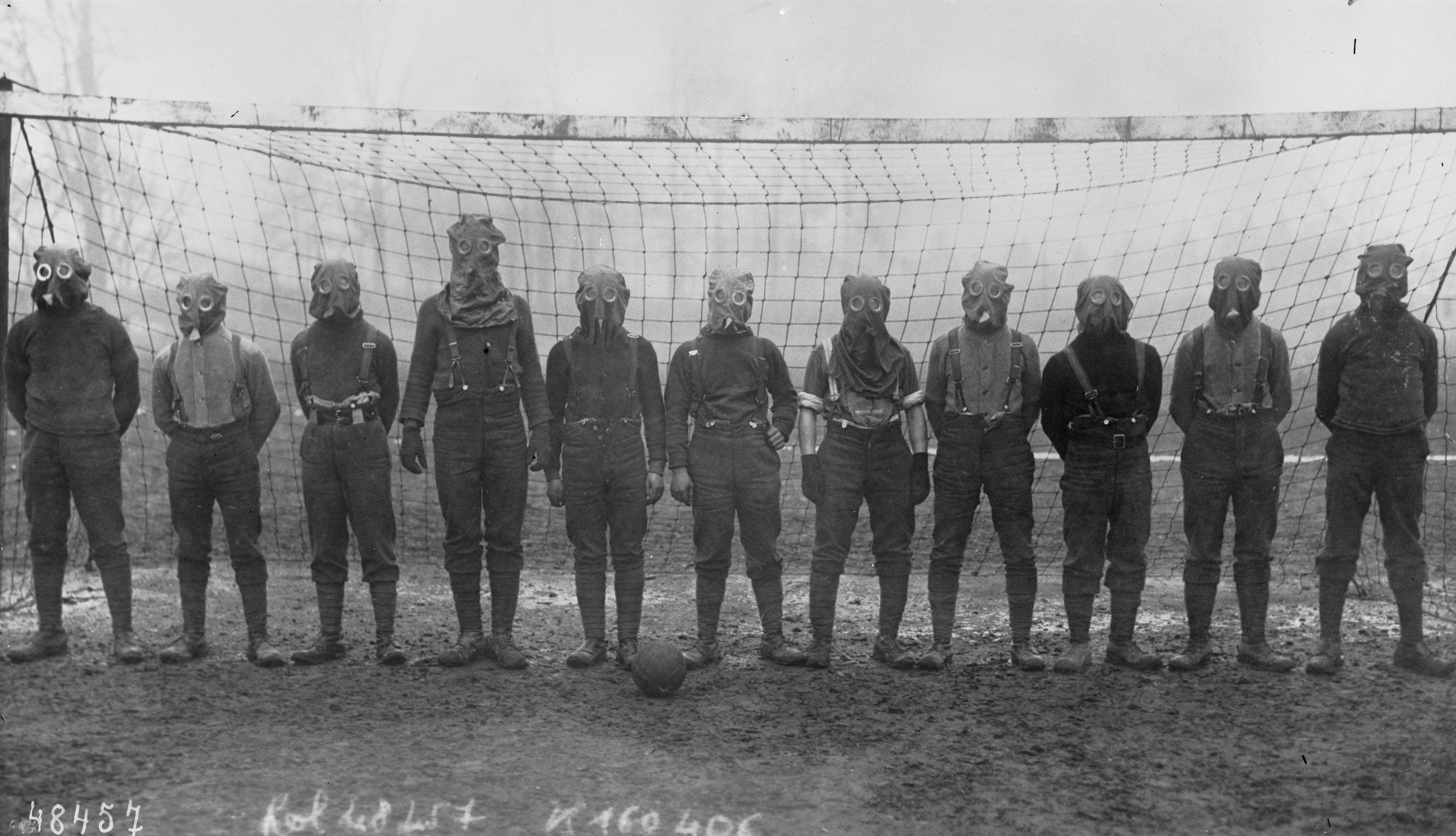
Football team of British soldiers with gas masks, Western front, 1916

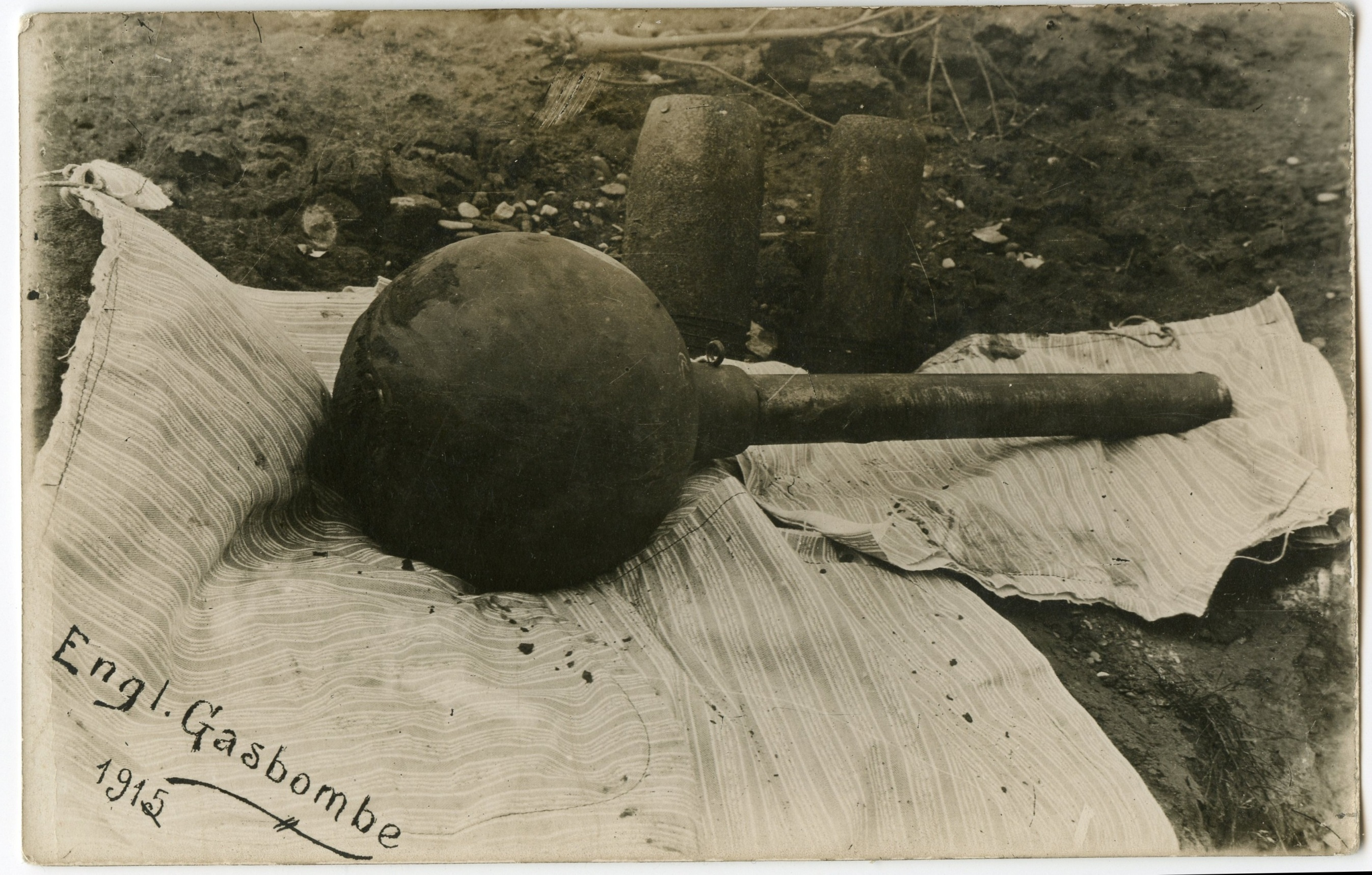
A British gas bomb from 1915

=== 1915: More deadly gases ===
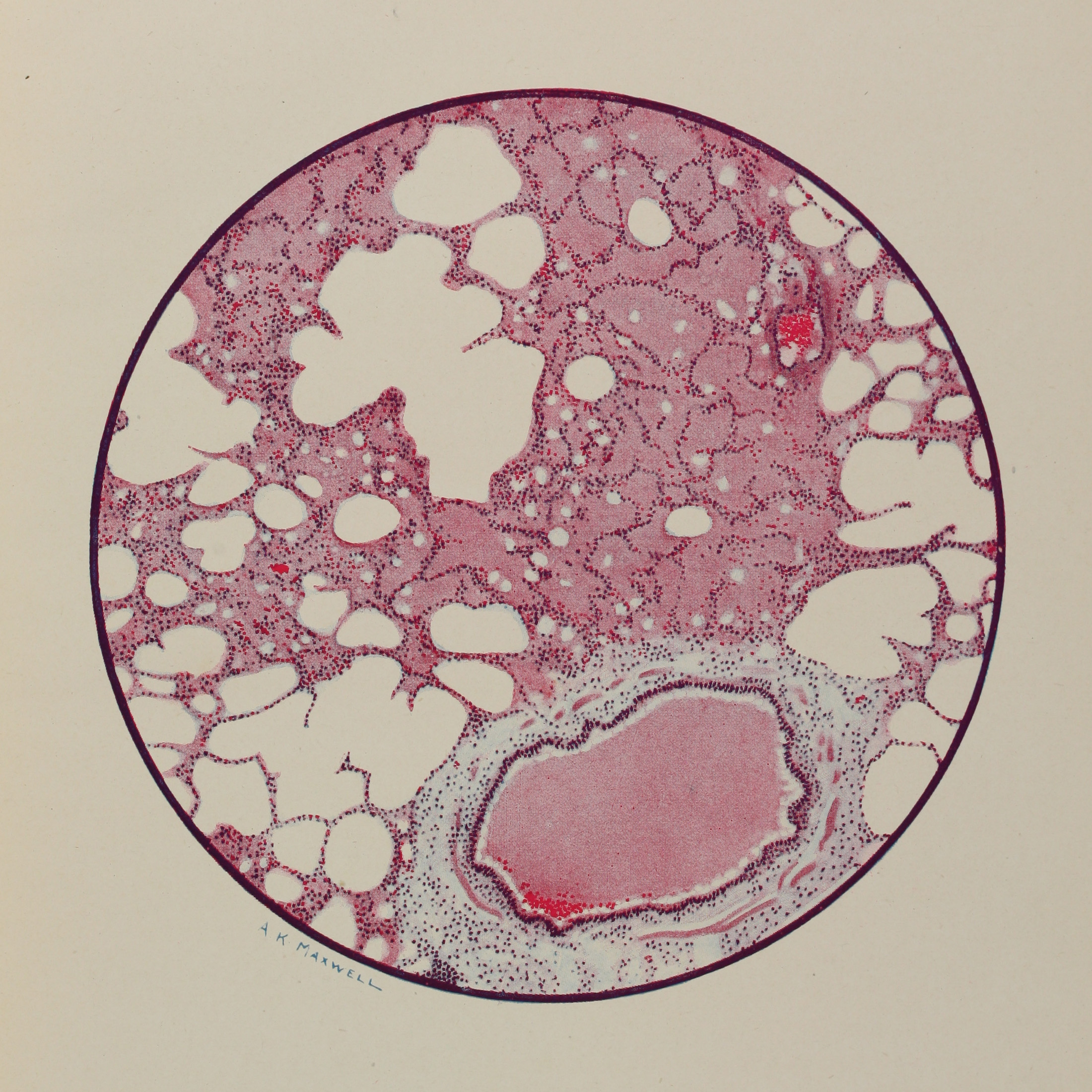
Microscopic section of human lung from phosgene shell poisoning from An Atlas of Gas Poisoning, 1918

The deficiencies of chlorine were overcome with the introduction of phosgene, which was prepared by a group of French chemists led by Victor Grignard and first used by France in 1915. Colourless and having an odour likened to "mouldy hay," phosgene was difficult to detect, making it a more effective weapon. Phosgene was sometimes used on its own, but was more often used mixed with an equal volume of chlorine, with the chlorine helping to spread the denser phosgene. The Allies called this combination White Star after the marking painted on shells containing the mixture. German phosgene came in the form of diphosgene, codenamed Grün Kreuz (Green Cross). This was less effective than its Allied counterpart, being less toxic and slower to evaporate, but was easier to handle in shell manufacture early in the war.

Phosgene was a potent killing agent, deadlier than chlorine. It had a potential drawback in that some of the symptoms of exposure took 24 hours or more to manifest. This meant that the victims were initially still capable of putting up a fight; this could also mean that apparently fit troops would be incapacitated by the effects of the gas on the following day.

In the first combined chlorine–phosgene attack by Germany, against British troops at Wieltje near Ypres, Belgium on 19 December 1915, 88 tons of the gas were released from cylinders causing 1069 casualties and 69 deaths. The British P gas helmet, issued at the time, was impregnated with sodium phenolate and partially effective against phosgene. The modified PH Gas Helmet, which was impregnated with phenate hexamine and hexamethylene tetramine (urotropine) to improve the protection against phosgene, was issued in January 1916.

Around 36,600 tons of phosgene were manufactured during the war, out of a total of 190,000 tons for all chemical weapons, making it second only to chlorine (93,800 tons) in the quantity manufactured:

- Germany 18,100 tons
- France 15,700 tons
- United Kingdom 1,400 tons (also used French stocks)
- United States 1,400 tons (also used French stocks)

=== 1916: Austrian use ===
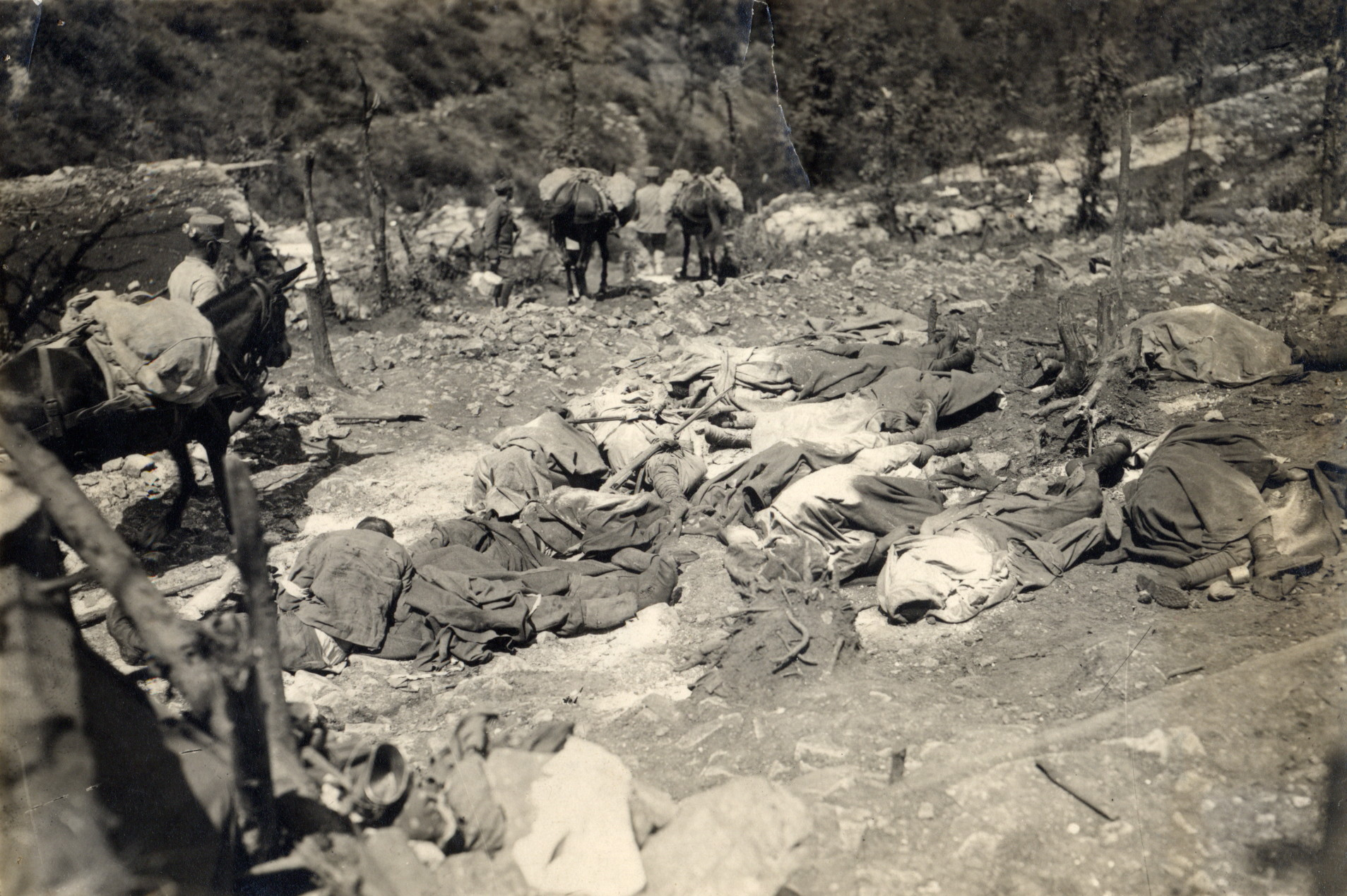
Italian dead after the Austrian gas attack on Monte San Michele

On 29 June 1916, the Austro-Hungarian Army attacked the Royal Italian Army's Brigade "Ferrara" on Monte San Michele with a mix of phosgene and chlorine gas. Thousands of Italian soldiers died in this first chemical weapons attack on the Italian Front.

=== 1917: Mustard gas ===
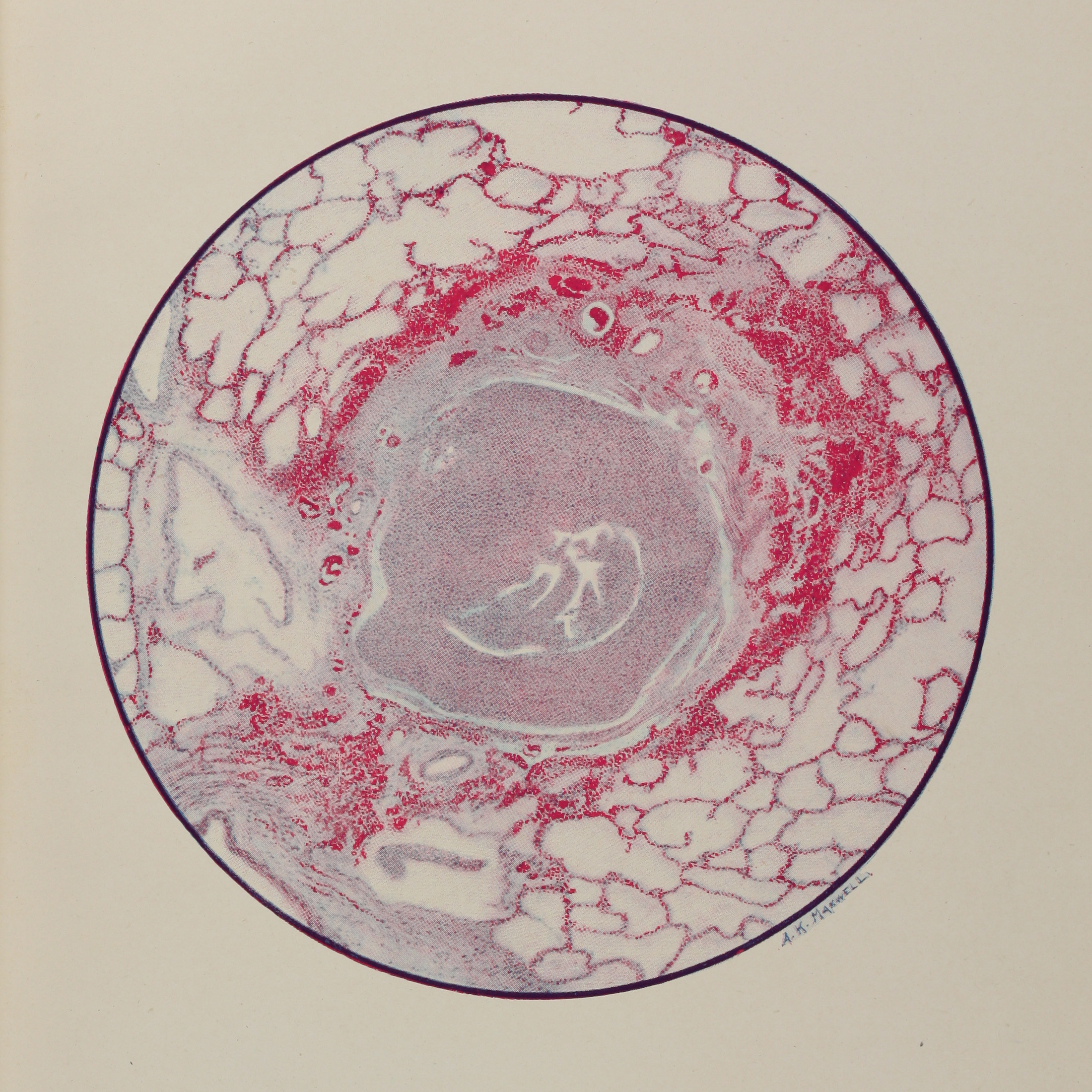
Microscopic section of human lung from mustard gas poisoning from An Atlas of Gas Poisoning, 1918

The most widely reported chemical agent of the First World War was mustard gas. Despite the name it is not a gas but a volatile oily liquid, and is dispersed as a fine mist of liquid droplets. It was introduced as a vesicant by Germany on 12 July 1917, weeks prior to the Third Battle of Ypres. The Germans marked their shells yellow for mustard gas and green for chlorine and phosgene; hence they called the new gas Yellow Cross. It was known to the British as HS (Hun Stuff), and the French called it Yperite (named after Ypres).

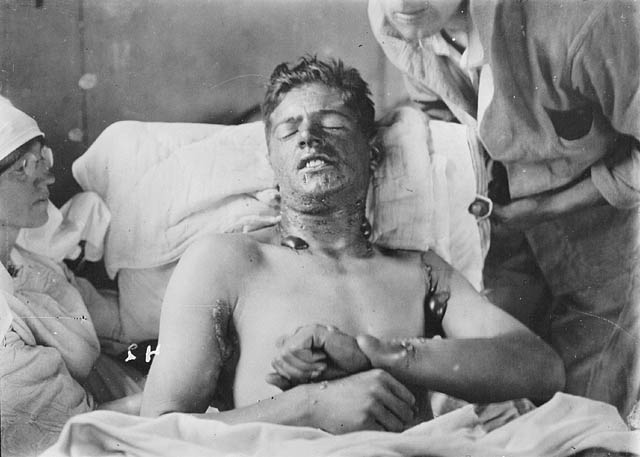
A Canadian soldier with mustard gas burns, 1917/1918

Mustard gas is not an effective killing agent (though in high enough doses it is fatal) but can be used to harass and disable the enemy and pollute the battlefield. Delivered in artillery shells, mustard gas was heavier than air and settled to the ground as an oily liquid. Once in the soil, mustard gas remained active for several days, weeks, or even months, depending on the weather conditions.

The skin of victims of mustard gas blistered, their eyes became very sore and they began to vomit. Mustard gas caused internal and external bleeding and attacked the bronchial tubes, stripping off the mucous membrane. This was extremely painful. Fatally injured victims sometimes took four or five weeks to die of mustard gas exposure.

One nurse, Vera Brittain, wrote: "I wish those people who talk about going on with this war whatever it costs could see the soldiers suffering from mustard gas poisoning. Great mustard-coloured blisters, blind eyes, all sticky and stuck together, always fighting for breath, with voices a mere whisper, saying that their throats are closing and they know they will choke."

The polluting nature of mustard gas meant that it was not always suitable for supporting an attack as the assaulting infantry would be exposed to the gas when they advanced. When Germany launched Operation Michael on 21 March 1918, they saturated the Flesquières salient with mustard gas instead of attacking it directly, believing that the harassing effect of the gas, coupled with threats to the salient's flanks, would make the British position untenable.

Gas never reproduced the dramatic success of 22 April 1915; it became a standard weapon which, combined with conventional artillery, was used to support most attacks in the later stages of the war. Gas was employed primarily on the Western Front—the static, confined trench system was ideal for achieving an effective concentration. Germany also used gas against Russia on the Eastern Front, where the lack of effective countermeasures resulted in deaths of over 56,000 Russians, while Britain experimented with gas in Palestine during the Second Battle of Gaza. Russia began manufacturing chlorine gas in 1916, with phosgene being produced later in the year. Most of the gas manufactured was never used.

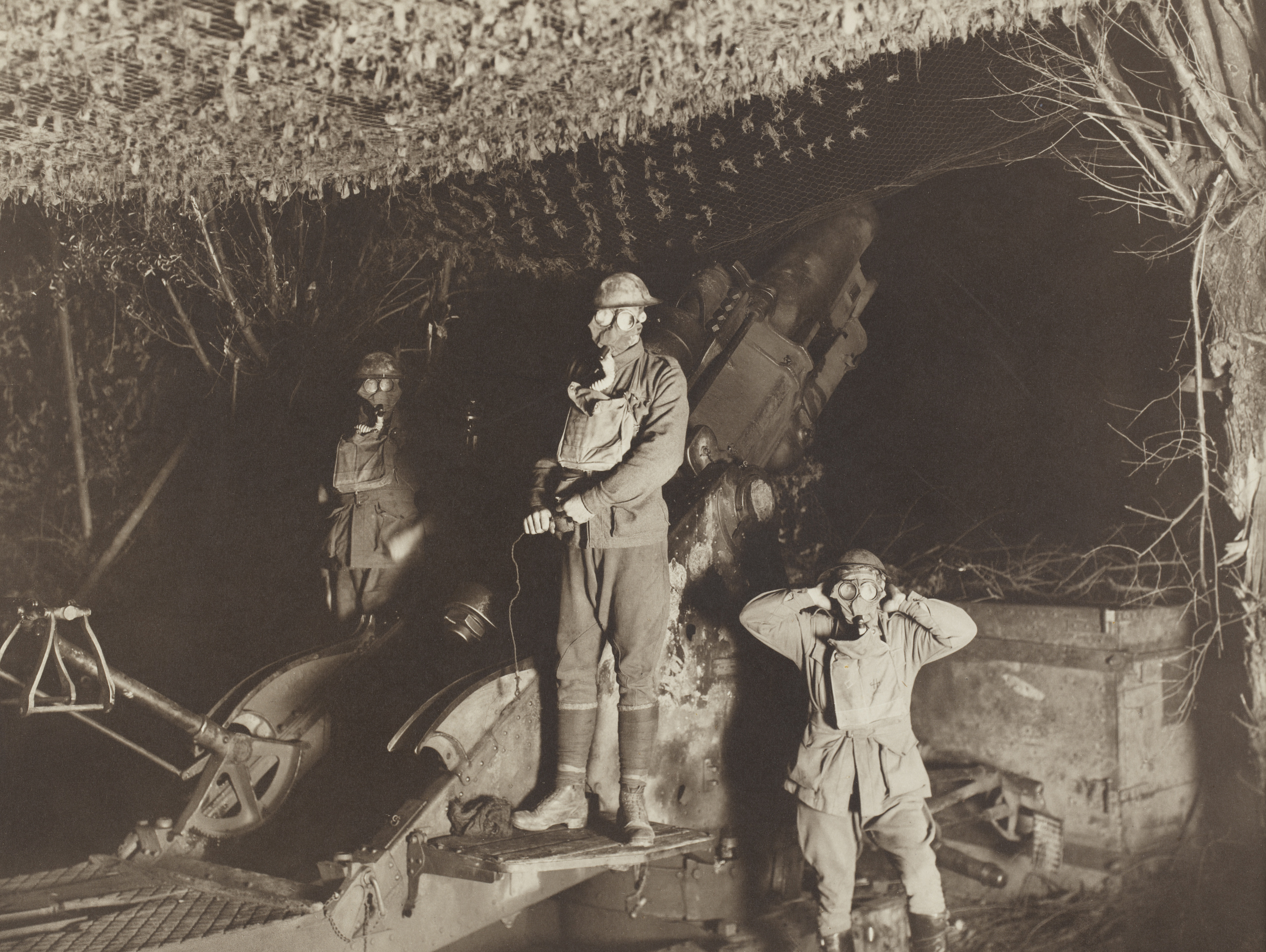
Australian gunners of the 55th Siege Battery working during a gas attack, 1917

The British Army first used mustard gas in November 1917 at Cambrai, after their armies had captured a stockpile of German mustard gas shells. It took the British more than a year to develop their own mustard gas weapon, with production of the chemicals centred on Avonmouth Docks. (The only option available to the British was the Despretz–Niemann–Guthrie process.) This was used first in September 1918 during the breaking of the Hindenburg Line with the Hundred Days' Offensive.

The Allies mounted more gas attacks than the Germans in 1917 and 1918 because of a marked increase in production of gas from the Allied nations. Germany was unable to keep up with this pace despite creating various new gases for use in battle, mostly as a result of very costly methods of production. Entry into the war by the United States allowed the Allies to increase mustard gas production far more than Germany. Also the prevailing wind on the Western Front was blowing from west to east, which meant the Allies more frequently had favourable conditions for a gas release than did the Germans.

When the United States entered the war, it was already mobilizing resources from academic, industry and military sectors for research and development into poison gas. A Subcommittee on Noxious Gases was created by the National Research Committee, a major research centre was established at Camp American University, and the 1st Gas Regiment was recruited. The 1st Gas Regiment eventually served in France, where it used phosgene gas in several attacks. The artillery used mustard gas with significant effect during the Meuse-Argonne Offensive on at least three occasions. The United States began large-scale production of an improved vesicant gas known as Lewisite, for use in an offensive planned for early 1919. By the time of the armistice on 11 November, a plant near Willoughby, Ohio was producing 10 tons per day of the substance, for a total of about 150 tons. It is uncertain what effect this new chemical would have had on the battlefield, as it degrades in moist conditions.

=== 1917: Use in the Battle of Caporetto ===
In September 1917 Otto Hahn was one of three officers, disguised in Austrian uniforms, sent to the Isonzo front in Italy to find a suitable location for an attack, using newly developed rifled minenwerfers that simultaneously hurled hundreds of containers of poison gas onto enemy targets. They selected a site where the Italian trenches were sheltered in a deep valley so that a gas cloud would persist. At 02:00 on the 24th of October, in the northern area of the battle (near Bovec/Plezzo) 894 metal tubes similar to Livens Projectors (Gaswurfminen), dug into a reverse slope, were triggered electrically to simultaneously fire canisters containing 600 ml (21 imp fl oz; 20 US fl oz) of chlorine–arsenic agent and diphosgene, smothering the Italian trenches in a dense cloud of poison gas. Knowing that their gas masks could protect them only for two hours or less, the defenders fled, but 500–600 were killed. Other parts of the valley were bombed with gas from common grenades. Then the front was quiet until 06:00, when all the Italian wire and trenches to be attacked were bombarded by mortars. The following Battle of Caporetto broke the Italian lines, and the Central Powers overran much of northern Italy.

== Post-war ==
By the end of the war, chemical weapons had lost much of their effectiveness against well trained and equipped troops. By that time, chemical weapon agents had inflicted an estimated 1.3 million casualties.

Nevertheless, in the following years, chemical weapons were used in several, mainly colonial, wars where one side had an advantage in equipment over the other. The British used poison gas, possibly adamsite, against Russian revolutionary troops beginning on 27 August 1919 and contemplated using chemical weapons against Iraqi insurgents in the 1920s; Bolshevik troops used poison gas to suppress the Tambov Rebellion in 1920, Spain used chemical weapons in Morocco against Rif tribesmen throughout the 1920s and Italy used mustard gas in Libya in 1930 and again during its invasion of Ethiopia in 1936. In 1925, a Chinese warlord, Zhang Zuolin, contracted a German company to build him a mustard gas plant in Shenyang, which was completed in 1927.

Public opinion had by then turned against the use of such weapons, which led to the Geneva Protocol, an updated and extensive prohibition of poison weapons. The Protocol, which was signed by most First World War combatants in 1925, bans the use (but not the stockpiling or production) of lethal gas and bacteriological weapons among signatories in international armed conflicts. Most countries that signed ratified it within around five years; a few took much longer—Brazil, Japan, Uruguay, and the United States did not do so until the 1970s, and Nicaragua ratified it in 1990. The signatory nations agreed not to use poison gas against each other in the future, both stating "the use in war of asphyxiating, poisonous or other gases, and of all analogous liquids, materials or devices, has been justly condemned by the general opinion of the civilized world" and "the High Contracting Parties ... agree to be bound as between themselves according to the terms of this declaration."

Chemical weapons have been used in at least a dozen wars since the end of the First World War; they were not used in combat on a large scale until Iraq used mustard gas and the more deadly nerve agents in the Halabja chemical attack near the end of the eight-year Iran–Iraq War. The full conflict's use of such weaponry killed around 20,000 Iranian troops (and injured another 80,000), around a quarter of the number of deaths caused by chemical weapons during the First World War.

=== The Geneva Protocol, 1925 ===
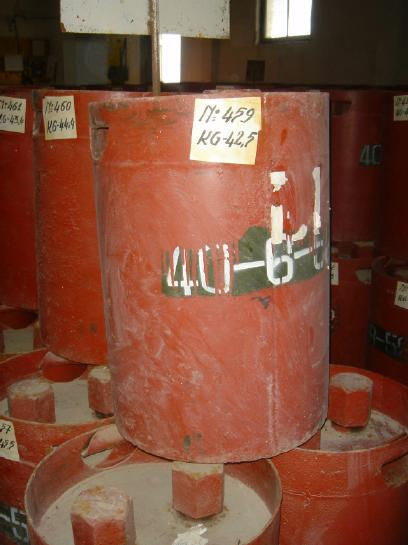
Chemical weapons canister and stockpile.

The Geneva Protocol, signed by 132 nations on June 17, 1925, was a treaty established to ban the use of chemical and biological weapons among signatories in international armed conflicts. As stated by Coupland and Leins, "it was fostered in part by a 1918 appeal in which the International Committee of the Red Cross (ICRC) described the use of poisonous gas against soldiers as a barbarous invention which science is bringing to perfection". Chemical warfare agents that contained bromine, nitroaromatic, and chlorine were dismantled and destroyed. The destruction and disposal of the chemicals did not consider the long-term and adverse impacts on the environment.

The Protocol does not ban the stockpilling or production of chemical weapons as well as the use of such weaponry against non-ratifying states and in internal disturbances or conflicts, and permits reservations that allow signatories to adopt the policy of no first use. As a result, the Chemical Weapons Convention (CWC) was drafted in 1993, which prohibits the development, production, stockpiling, and use of chemical weapons. Despite there being an international ban on chemical warfare, the CWC "allows domestic law enforcement agencies of the signing countries to use chemical weapons on their citizens".

=== Effect on World War II ===
All major combatants stockpiled chemical weapons during the Second World War, but the only reports of its use in the conflict were the Japanese use of relatively small amounts of mustard gas and lewisite in China, Italy's use of gas in Ethiopia (in what is more often considered to be the Second Italo-Ethiopian War), and very rare occurrences in Europe (for example some mustard gas bombs were dropped on Warsaw on 3 September 1939, which Germany acknowledged in 1942 but indicated had been accidental). Mustard gas was the agent of choice, with the British stockpiling 40,719 tons, the Soviets 77,400 tons, the Americans over 87,000 tons and the Germans 27,597 tons. The destruction of an American cargo ship containing mustard gas led to many casualties in Bari, Italy, in December 1943.

In both Axis and Allied nations, children in school were taught to wear gas masks in case of gas attack. Germany developed the poison gases tabun, sarin, and soman during the war, and used Zyklon B in their extermination camps. Neither Germany nor the Allied nations used any of their war gases in combat, despite maintaining large stockpiles and occasional calls for their use. (Note: The US reportedly had about 135,000 tons of chemical warfare agents during WW II; Germany had 70,000 tons, Britain 40,000 and Japan 7,500 tons. The German nerve gases were deadlier than the old-style suffocants (chlorine, phosgene) and blistering agents (mustard gas) in Allied stockpiles. Churchill and several American generals reportedly called for their use against Germany and Japan, respectively (Weber, 1985).) Poison gas played an important role in the Holocaust.

Britain made plans to use mustard gas on the landing beaches in the event of an invasion of the United Kingdom in 1940. The United States considered using gas to support their planned invasion of Japan.

== Casualties ==
John Singer Sargent's 1918 painting Gassed

Casualties injured by gas weapons recovering in a field hospital

A range of authors have attempted to estimate the casualties from chemical weapons in WWI. This is hampered by incomplete data. British casualties were best recorded, while estimates of gas casualties amongst Russians on the Eastern front have been described as "pure guesswork", a major issue as it is often claimed that a large proportion of casualties occurred there. A commonly used estimate claims 90,000 fatalities and 1.3 million casualties. Of these, 26,600 deaths and 652,000 casualties come from the UK, France, Germany and the US where more dependable data exists. Of the rest, historian L. F. Haber suggests the usual estimates are likely too high, but concedes "we shall never know".

It is generally agreed that the contribution of gas weapons to the total casualty figures was relatively minor. British figures, which were accurately maintained from 1916, recorded that 3% of gas casualties were fatal, 2% were permanently invalid and 70% were fit for duty again within six weeks.

It was remarked as a joke that if someone yelled 'Gas', everyone in France would put on a mask. ... Gas shock was as frequent as shell shock.

— H. Allen, Towards the Flame, 1934

Gas! GAS! Quick, boys! — An ecstasy of fumbling,
Fitting the clumsy helmets just in time;
But someone still was yelling out and stumbling,
And flound'ring like a man in fire or lime ...
Dim, through the misty panes and thick green light,
As under a green sea, I saw him drowning.
In all my dreams, before my helpless sight,
He plunges at me, guttering, choking, drowning.

— Wilfred Owen, "Dulce et Decorum est", 1917

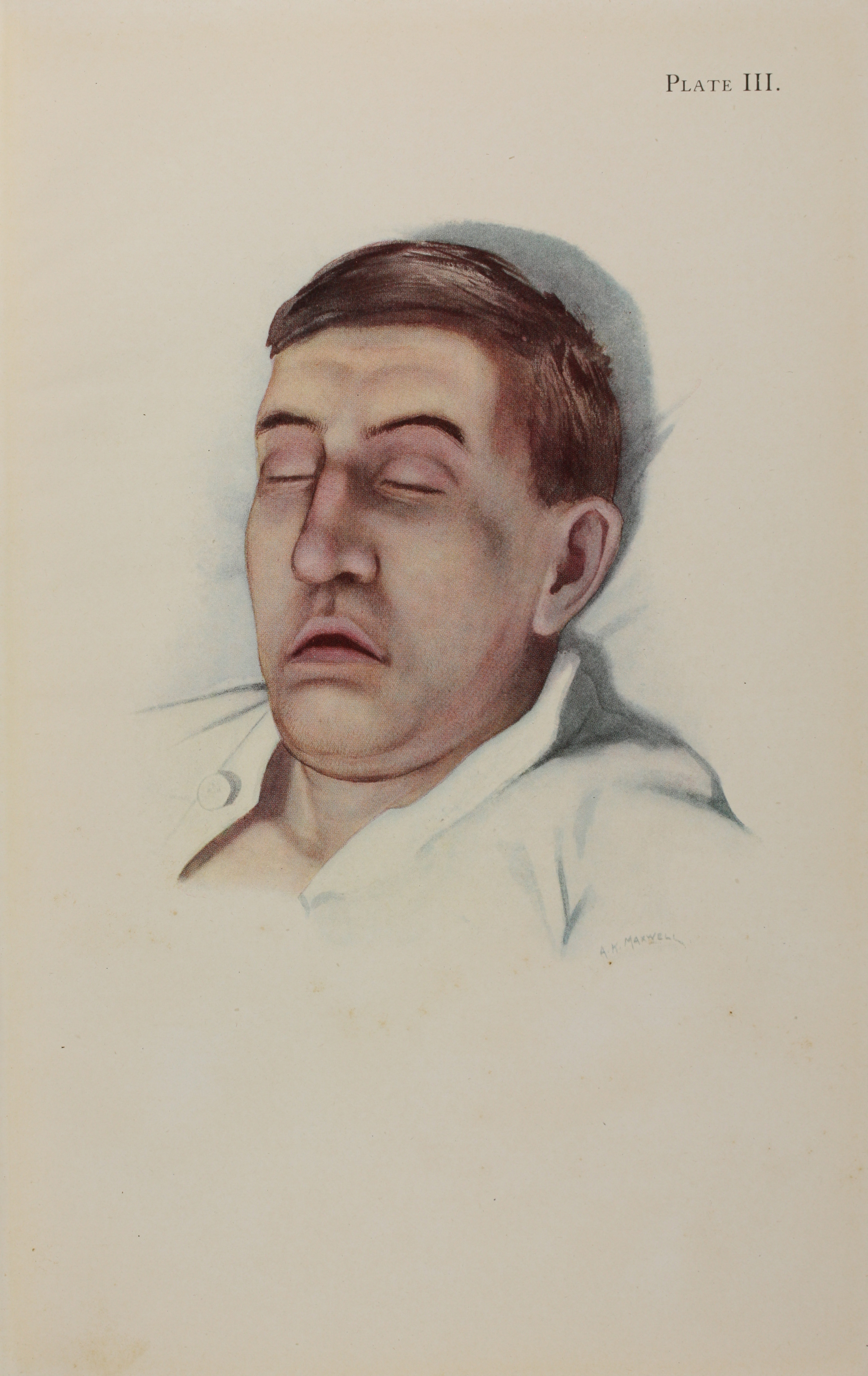
Plate III, Pallid type of asphyxia from phosgene poisoning, with circulatory failure, American Red Cross and Medical Research Committee, An Atlas of Gas Poisoning, 1918

Death by gas was often slow and painful. According to Denis Winter (Death's Men, 1978), a fatal dose of phosgene eventually led to "shallow breathing and retching, pulse up to 120, an ashen face and the discharge of four pints (2 litres) of yellow liquid from the lungs each hour for the 48 of the drowning spasms."

A common fate of those exposed to gas was blindness, chlorine gas or mustard gas being the main causes. One of the most famous First World War paintings, Gassed by John Singer Sargent, captures such a scene of mustard gas casualties which he witnessed at a dressing station at Le Bac-du-Sud near Arras in July 1918. (The gases used during that battle (tear gas) caused temporary blindness and/or a painful stinging in the eyes. These bandages were normally water-soaked to provide a rudimentary form of pain relief to the eyes of casualties before they reached more organized medical help.)

The proportion of mustard gas fatalities to total casualties was low; 2% of mustard gas casualties died and many of these succumbed to secondary infections rather than the gas itself. Once it was introduced at the third battle of Ypres, mustard gas produced 90% of all British gas casualties and 14% of battle casualties of any type.

Estimated gas casualties
Nation	Fatal	Total (Fatal & non-fatal)
More reliable data:
Germany	9,000	200,000
France	8,000	190,000
British Empire (includes Canada)	8,109	188,706
United States	1,462	72,807
Less reliable data:
Russia	56,000	419,340
Austria-Hungary	3,000	100,000
Italy	4,627	60,000
Others	1,000	10,000

Mustard gas was a source of extreme dread. In The Anatomy of Courage (1945), Lord Moran, who had been a medical officer during the war, wrote:

After July 1917 gas partly usurped the role of high explosive in bringing to head a natural unfitness for war. The gassed men were an expression of trench fatigue, a menace when the manhood of the nation had been picked over.

Mustard gas did not need to be inhaled to be effective—any contact with skin was sufficient. Exposure to 0.1 ppm was enough to cause massive blisters. Higher concentrations could burn flesh to the bone. It was particularly effective against the soft skin of the eyes, nose, armpits and groin, since it dissolved in the natural moisture of those areas. Typical exposure would result in swelling of the conjunctiva and eyelids, forcing them closed and rendering the victim temporarily blind. Where it contacted the skin, moist red patches would immediately appear which after 24 hours would have formed into blisters. Other symptoms included severe headache, elevated pulse and temperature (fever), and pneumonia (from blistering in the lungs).

Many of those who survived a gas attack were scarred for life. Respiratory disease and failing eyesight were common post-war afflictions. Of the Canadians who, without any effective protection, had withstood the first chlorine attacks during Second Ypres, 60% of the casualties had to be repatriated and half of these were still unfit by the end of the war, over three years later.

Many of those who were fairly soon recorded as fit for service were left with scar tissue in their lungs. This tissue was susceptible to tuberculosis attack. It was from this that many of the 1918 casualties died, around the time of the Second World War, shortly before sulfa drugs became widely available for its treatment.

=== British testimony ===
British forces gas casualties on the Western Front
Date	Agent	Casualties (official)	
Date	Agent	Fatal	Non-fatal
April–May 1915	Chlorine	350	7,000
May 1915 – June 1916	Lachrymants	0	0
December 1915 – August 1916	Chlorine	1,013	4,207
July 1916 – July 1917	Various	532	8,806
July 1917 – November 1918	Mustard gas	4,086	160,526
April 1915 – November 1918	Total	5,981	180,539

A British nurse treating mustard gas cases recorded:

They cannot be bandaged or touched. We cover them with a tent of propped-up sheets. Gas burns must be agonizing because usually the other cases do not complain even with the worst wounds but gas cases are invariably beyond endurance and they cannot help crying out.

A postmortem account from the British official medical history records one of the British casualties:

Case four. Aged 39 years. Gassed 29 July 1917. Admitted to casualty clearing station the same day. Died about ten days later. Brownish pigmentation present over large surfaces of the body. A white ring of skin where the wrist watch was. Marked superficial burning of the face and scrotum. The larynx much congested. The whole of the trachea was covered by a yellow membrane. The bronchi contained abundant gas. The lungs fairly voluminous. The right lung showing extensive collapse at the base. Liver congested and fatty. Stomach showed numerous submucous haemorrhages. The brain substance was unduly wet and very congested.

=== Civilian casualties ===
The belligerents avoided deliberate attacks on civilians, but the distribution of gas cloud casualties was not only limited to the front. Nearby towns were at risk from winds blowing the poison gases through, with only the French taking special precautions in planning gas attacks. Later in the war, the British provided warnings and issued civilians working near the front with gas masks, leading to improved preparedness. Eventually, everyone within 8 kilometers of the front was to carry a respirator at all times. Regardless, a significant number would be exposed, with the most serious case in Armentières where lingering mustard gas residue from heavy German bombardment in July 1917 led to 675 civilian casualties (including 86 killed). Hundreds of shells rained down per minute, and while civilians had shelters and gas masks, the particular dangers of mustard gas were not yet known. British and French records list a total of around 1325 civilian casualties, including over a hundred deaths from German gas weapons. This is an underestimate as smaller incidents of exposure have not been recorded, and there is no German record of civilian casualties from Allied weapons. In addition, around 4000 civilians working in chemical weapons production and shell filling in France, Britain and the United States were injured due to accidental exposure. Similar figures for Germany are not available, though it is known that there were a number of deaths. The British did not publicise incidents of civilians being gassed by Germans due to fears about the effect on morale at home. Many commanders on both sides knew that such weapons would cause major harm to civilians as wind would blow poison gases into nearby civilian towns but nonetheless continued to use them throughout the war. British Field Marshal Sir Douglas Haig wrote in his diary: "My officers and I were aware that such weapon would cause harm to women and children living in nearby towns, as strong winds were common on the battlefront. However, because the weapon was to be directed against the enemy, none of us were overly concerned at all."

== Countermeasures ==
None of the First World War's combatants were prepared for the introduction of poison gas as a weapon. Once gas was introduced, development of gas protection began and the process continued for much of the war, producing a series of increasingly effective gas masks.

Even at Second Ypres, Germany, still unsure of the weapon's effectiveness, only issued breathing masks to the engineers handling the gas. At Ypres a Canadian medical officer, who was also a chemist, quickly identified the gas as chlorine and recommended that the troops urinate on a cloth and hold it over their mouth and nose. Urine would be left to sit for a period so that the ammonia would activate; this would neutralize some of the chemicals in the chlorine gas, which allowed them to delay the German advance at Ypres, giving the Allies time to reinforce the area when French and other colonial troops had retreated. The first official equipment issued was similarly crude: a pad of material, usually impregnated with a chemical, tied over the lower face. To protect the eyes from tear gas, soldiers were issued gas goggles.

The next advance was the introduction of the gas helmet, which was basically a bag placed over the head. The fabric of the bag was impregnated with a chemical to neutralize the gas; the chemical would wash out into the soldier's eyes whenever it rained. Eye-pieces, which were prone to fog up, were initially made from talc. When going into combat, gas helmets were typically worn rolled up on top of the head, to be pulled down and secured about the neck when the gas alarm was given. The first British version was the hypo helmet, the fabric of which was soaked in sodium hyposulfite (commonly known as "hypo"). The British P gas helmet, partially effective against phosgene and with which all infantry were equipped with at Loos, was impregnated with sodium phenolate. A mouthpiece was added through which the wearer would breathe out to prevent carbon dioxide build-up. The adjutant of the 1/23rd Battalion, The London Regiment, recalled his experience of the P helmet at Loos:

The goggles rapidly dimmed over, and the air came through in such suffocatingly small quantities as to demand a continuous exercise of will-power on the part of the wearers.

A modified version of the P helmet, called the PH helmet, was issued in January 1916, and was impregnated with hexamethylenetetramine to improve protection against phosgene.

Self-contained box respirators represented the culmination of gas mask development during the First World War. Box respirators used a two-piece design; a mouthpiece connected via a hose to a box filter. The box filter contained granules of chemicals that neutralised the gas, delivering clean air to the wearer. Separating the filter from the mask enabled a bulky but efficient filter to be supplied. Nevertheless, the first version, known as the large box respirator (LBR) or "Harrison's Tower", was deemed too bulky—the box canister needed to be carried on the back. The LBR had no mask, just a mouthpiece and nose clip; separate gas goggles had to be worn. It continued to be issued to the artillery gun crews but the infantry were supplied with the "small box respirator" (SBR).

The Small Box Respirator featured a single-piece, close-fitting rubberized mask with eye-pieces. The box filter was compact and could be worn around the neck. The SBR could be readily upgraded as more effective filter technology was developed. The British-designed SBR was also adopted for use by the American Expeditionary Force. The SBR was the prized possession of the ordinary infantryman; when the British were forced to retreat during the German spring offensive of 1918, it was found that while some troops had discarded their rifles, hardly any had left behind their respirators.

Horses and mules were important methods of transport that could be endangered if they came into close contact with gas. This was not so much of a problem until it became common to launch gas great distances. This caused researchers to develop masks that could be used on animals such as dogs, horses, mules, and even carrier pigeons.

For mustard gas, which could cause severe damage by simply making contact with skin, no effective countermeasure was found during the war. The kilt-wearing Scottish regiments were especially vulnerable to mustard gas injuries due to their bare legs. At Nieuwpoort in Flanders some Scottish battalions took to wearing women's tights beneath the kilt as a form of protection.

Gas alert procedure became a routine for the front-line soldier. To warn of a gas attack, a bell would be rung, often made from a spent artillery shell. At the noisy batteries of the siege guns, a compressed air strombus horn was used, which could be heard nine miles (14 km) away. Notices would be posted on all approaches to an affected area, warning people to take precautions.

Other British attempts at countermeasures were not so effective. An early plan was to use 100,000 fans to disperse the gas. Burning coal or carborundum dust was tried. A proposal was made to equip front-line sentries with diving helmets, air being pumped to them through a 100 ft (30 m) hose.

The effectiveness of all countermeasures is apparent. In 1915, when poison gas was relatively new, less than 3% of British gas casualties died. In 1916, the proportion of fatalities jumped to 17%. By 1918, the figure was back below 3%, though the total number of British gas casualties was now nine times the 1915 levels.

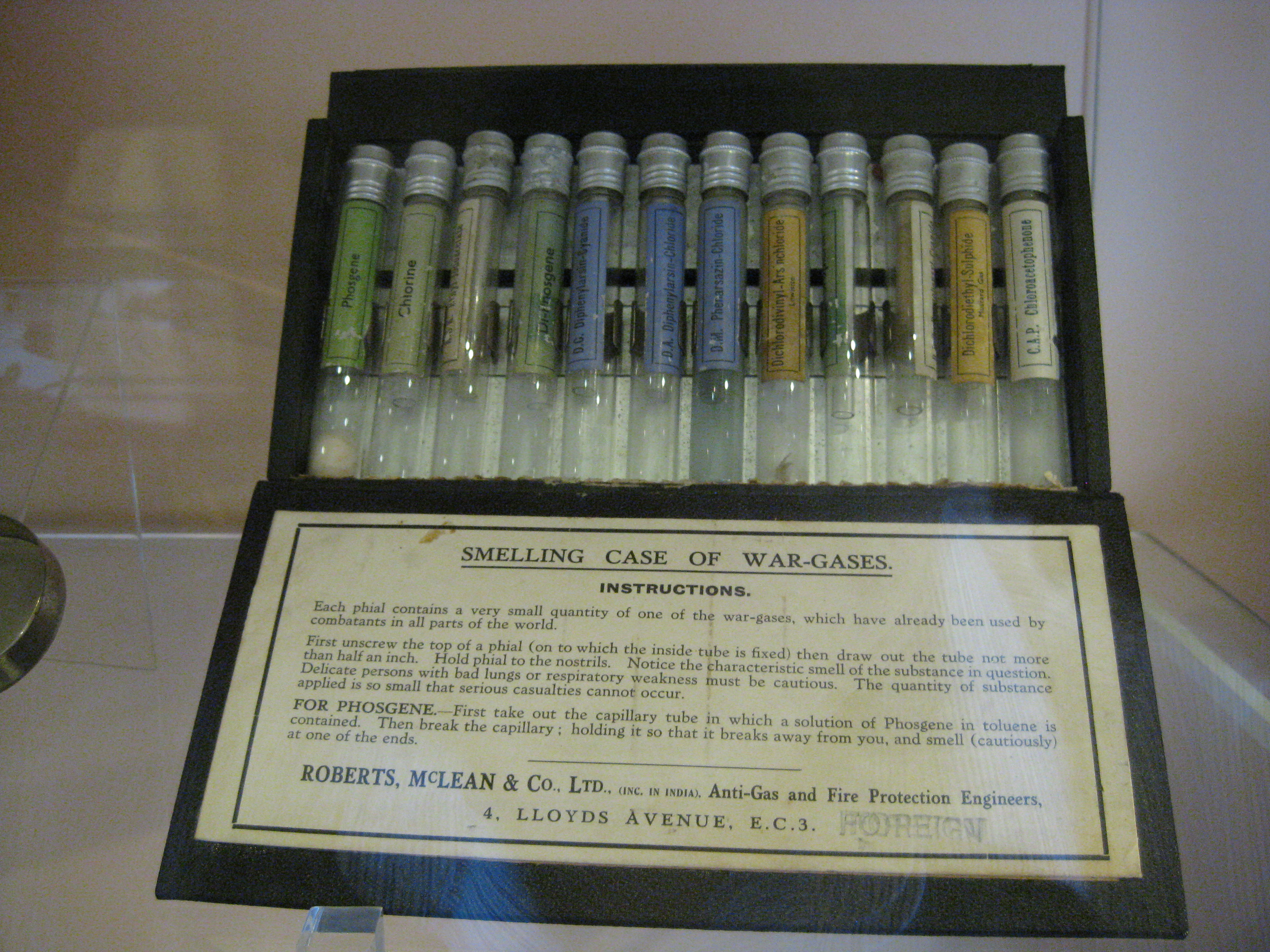
A smelling case to allow officers to identify the gas by smell and thus act appropriately for protection and treatment

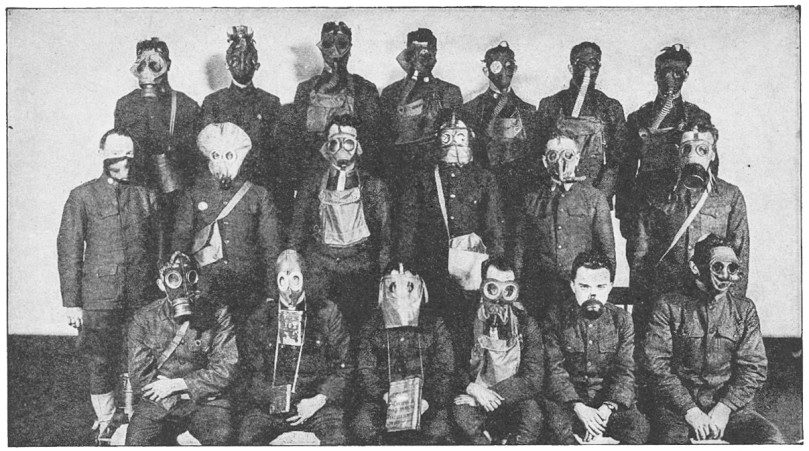
Various gas masks employed on the Western Front during the war

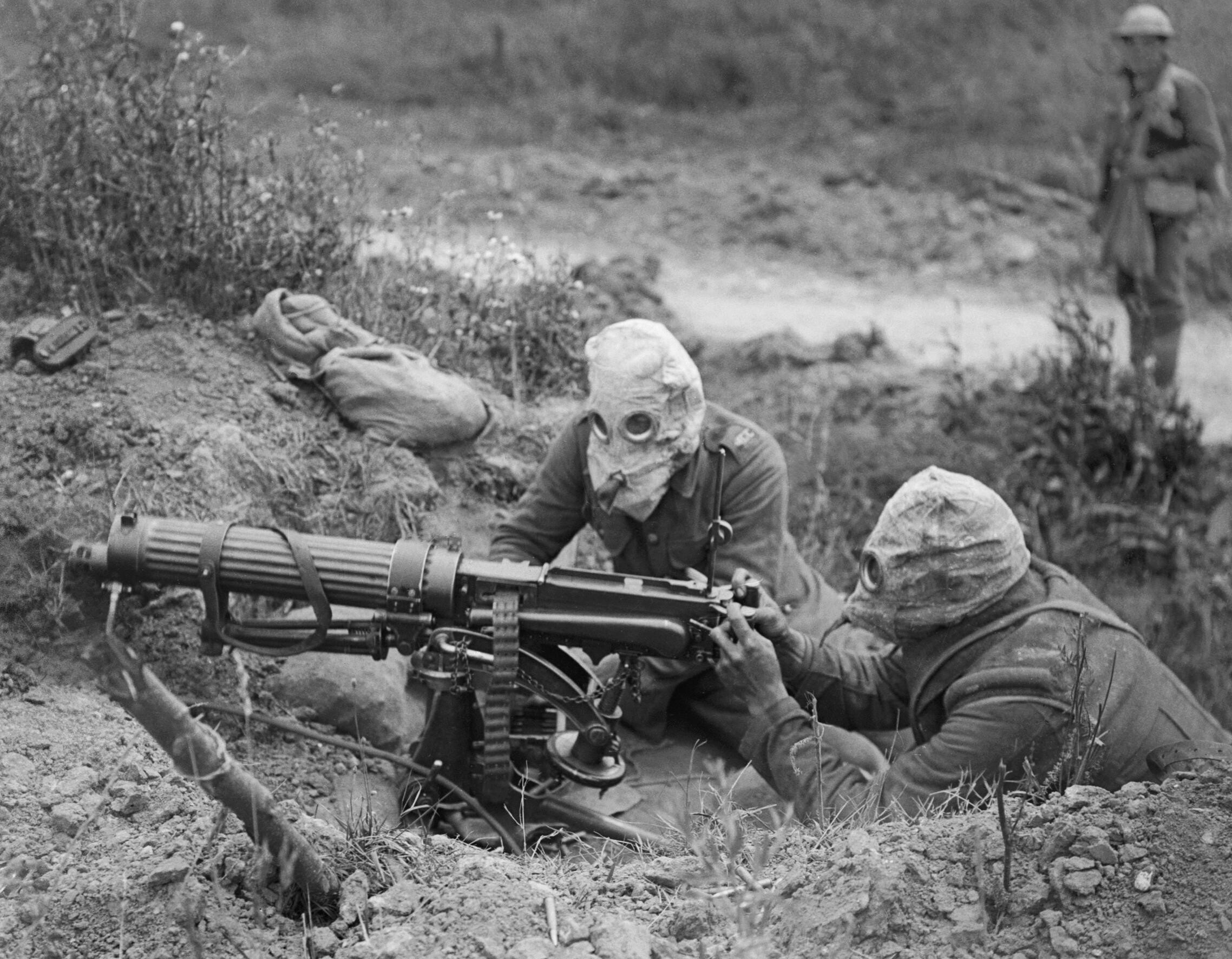
British Vickers machine gun crew wearing PH gas helmets with exhaust tubes

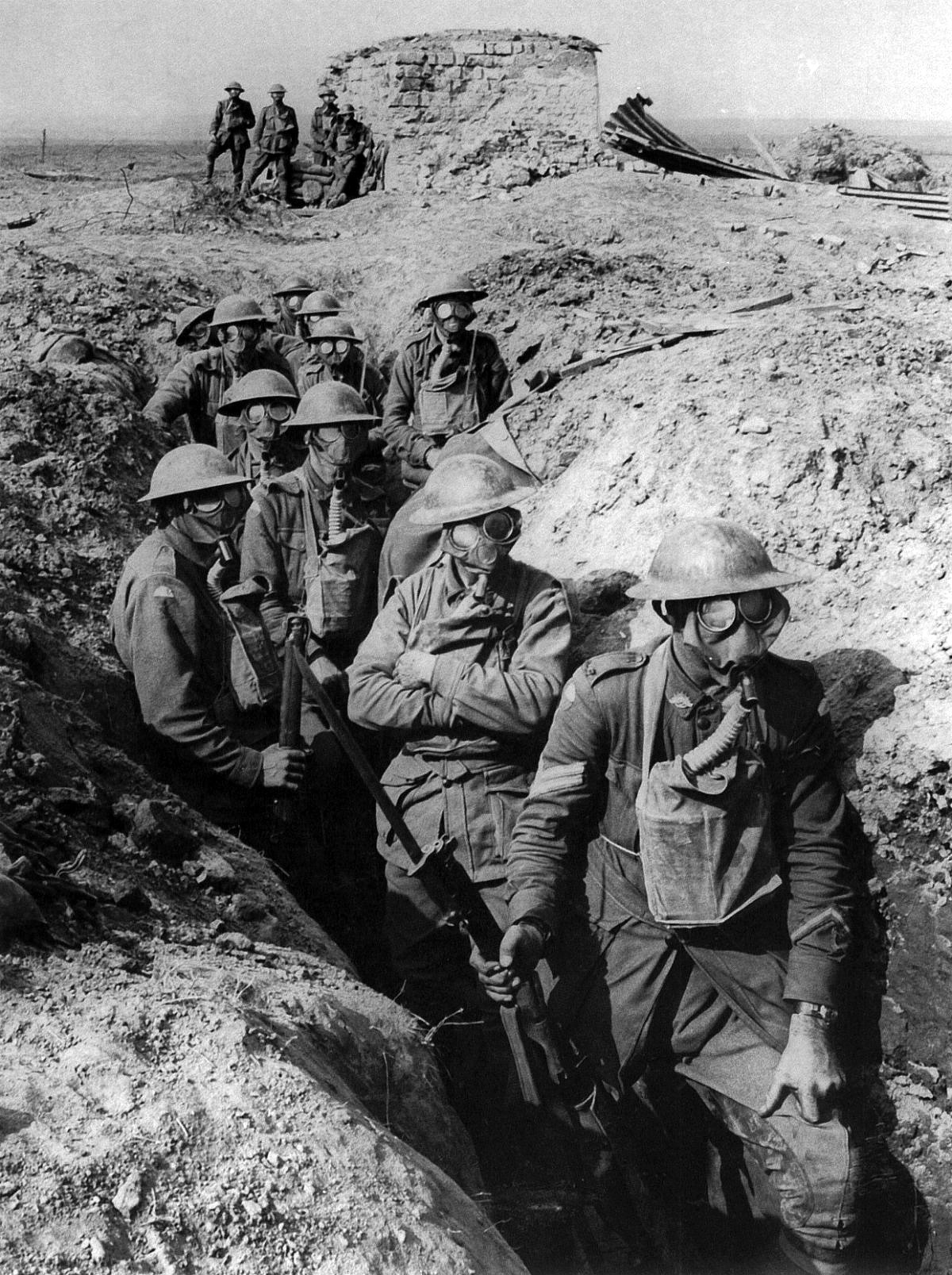
Australian infantry wearing small box respirators, Ypres, September 1917

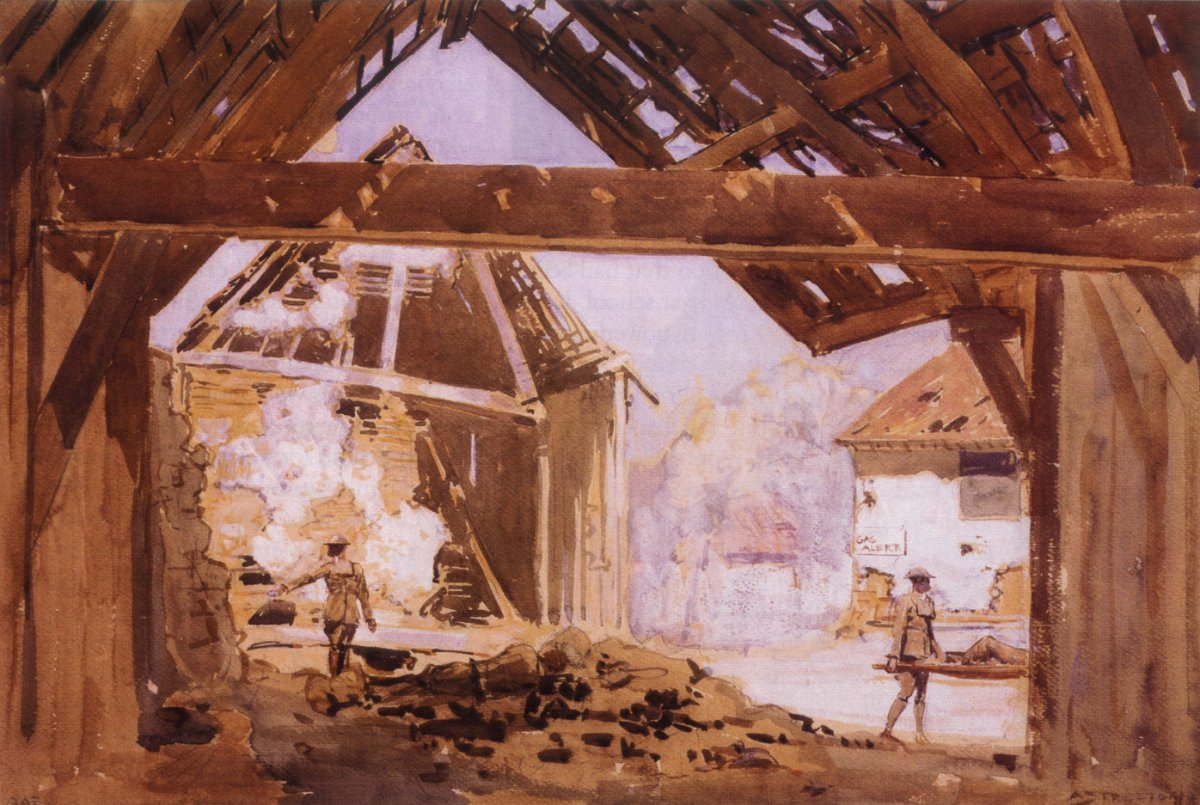
Gas Alert by Arthur Streeton, 1918

== Delivery systems ==
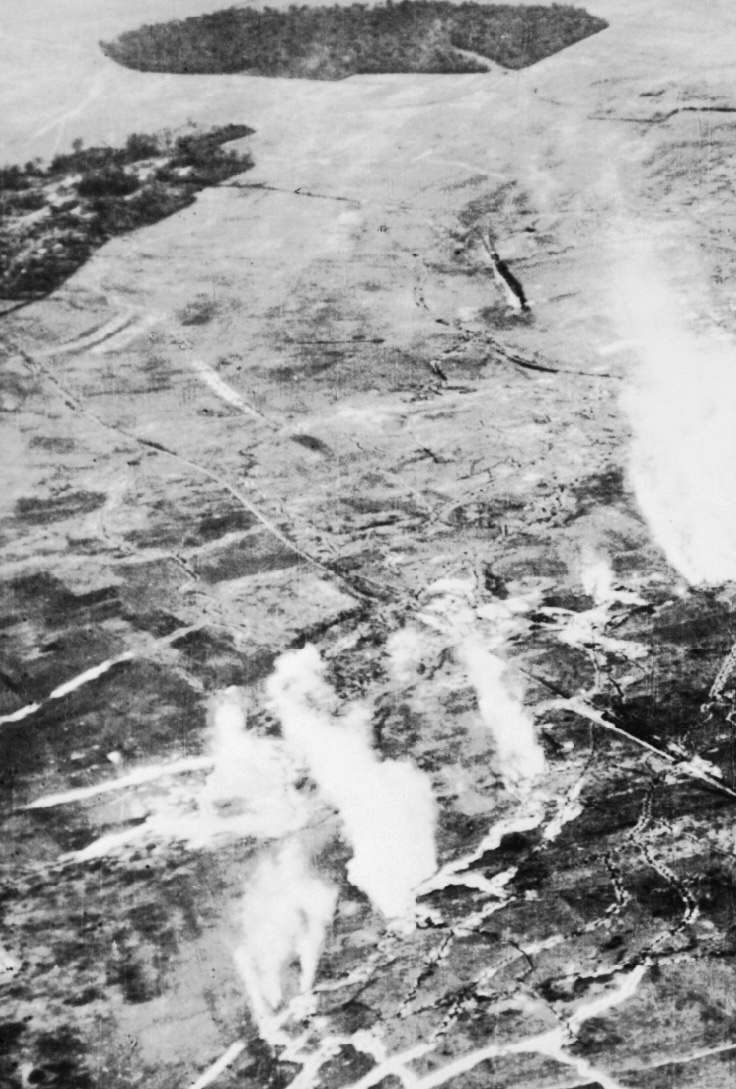
A British cylinder release at Montauban on the Somme, June 1916 – part of the preparation for the Battle of the Somme.

The first system employed for the mass delivery of gas involved releasing the gas cylinders in a favourable wind such that it was carried over the enemy's trenches. The Hague Convention of 1899 prohibited the use of poison gasses delivered by projectiles. The main advantage of this method was that it was relatively simple and, in suitable atmospheric conditions, produced a concentrated cloud capable of overwhelming the gas mask defences. The disadvantages of cylinder releases were numerous. First and foremost, delivery was at the mercy of the wind. If the wind was fickle, as was the case at Loos, the gas could backfire, causing friendly casualties. Gas clouds gave plenty of warning, allowing the enemy time to protect themselves, though many soldiers found the sight of a creeping gas cloud unnerving. Gas clouds had limited penetration, only capable of affecting the front-line trenches before dissipating.

Finally, the cylinders had to be emplaced at the very front of the trench system so that the gas was released directly over no man's land. This meant that the cylinders had to be manhandled through communication trenches, often clogged and sodden, and stored at the front where there was always the risk that cylinders would be prematurely breached during a bombardment. A leaking cylinder could issue a telltale wisp of gas that, if spotted, would be sure to attract shellfire.

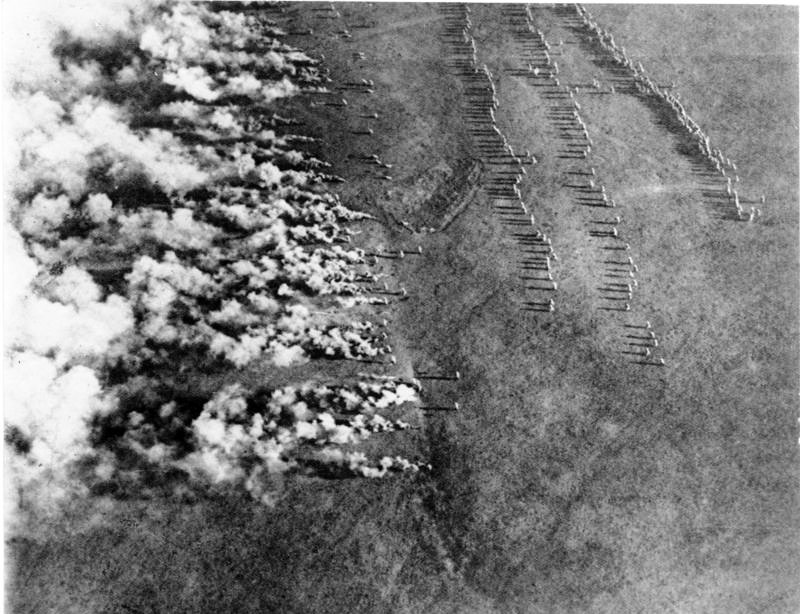
German gas attack on the eastern front.

A British chlorine cylinder, known as an "oojah", weighed 190 pounds (86 kg), of which 60 pounds (27 kg) was chlorine gas, and required two men to carry. Phosgene gas was introduced later in a cylinder, known as a "mouse", that weighed 50 pounds (23 kg).

Delivering gas via artillery shell overcame many of the risks of dealing with gas in cylinders. The Germans, for example, used 5.9-inch (150 mm) artillery shells. Gas shells were independent of the wind and increased the effective range of gas, making anywhere within reach of the guns vulnerable. Gas shells could be delivered without warning, especially the clear, nearly odourless phosgene—there are numerous accounts of gas shells, landing with a "plop" rather than exploding, being initially dismissed as dud HE or shrapnel shells, giving the gas time to work before the soldiers were alerted and took precautions.

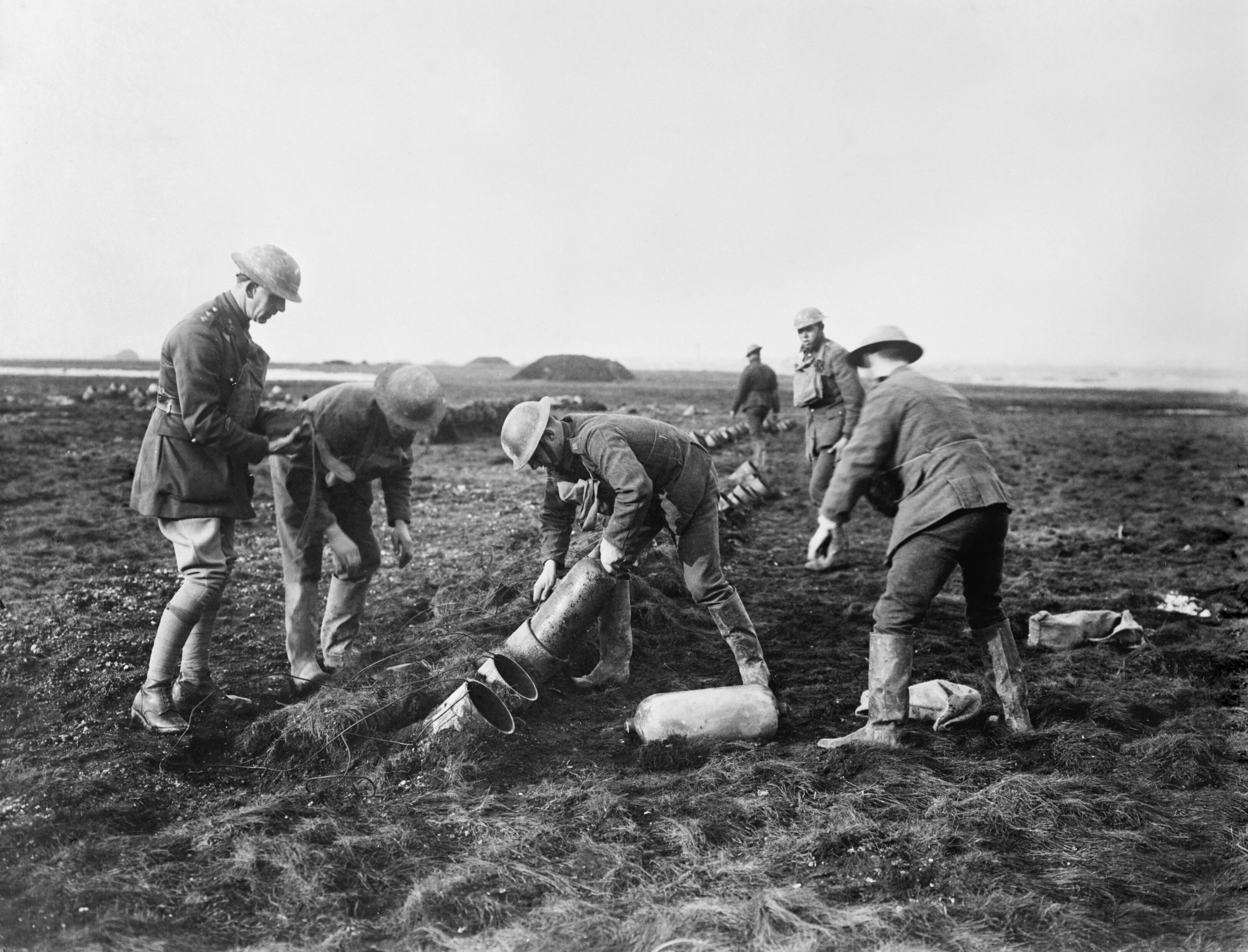
Loading a battery of Livens gas projectors

The main flaw associated with delivering gas via artillery was the difficulty of achieving a killing concentration. Each shell had a small gas payload and an area would have to be subjected to a saturation bombardment to produce a cloud to match cylinder delivery. Mustard gas did not need to form a concentrated cloud and hence artillery was the ideal vehicle for delivery of this battlefield pollutant.

The solution to achieving a lethal concentration without releasing from cylinders was the "gas projector", essentially a large-bore mortar that fired the entire cylinder as a missile. The British Livens projector (invented by Captain W.H. Livens in 1917) was a simple device; an 8-inch (200 mm) diameter tube sunk into the ground at an angle, a propellant was ignited by an electrical signal, firing the cylinder containing 30 or 40 lb (14 or 18 kg) of gas up to 1,900 metres. By arranging a battery of these projectors and firing them simultaneously, a dense concentration of gas could be achieved. The Livens was first used at Arras on 4 April 1917. On 31 March 1918 the British conducted their largest ever "gas shoot", firing 3,728 cylinders at Lens.

== Unexploded weapons ==
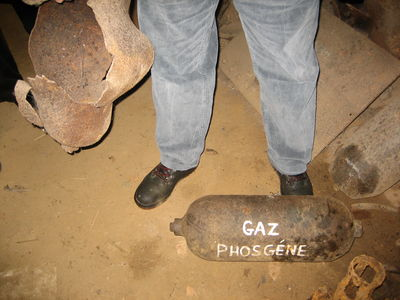
Phosgene delivery system unearthed at the Somme, 2006

Over 16,000,000 acres (65,000 km^{2}) of France had to be cordoned off at the end of the war because of unexploded ordnance. About 20% of the chemical shells were duds, and approximately 13 million of these munitions were left in place. This has been a serious problem in former battle areas from immediately after the end of the War until the present. Shells may be, for instance, uncovered when farmers plough their fields (termed the 'iron harvest'), and are also regularly discovered when public works or construction work is done. After the armistice, people sought unexploded weapons for their metal value, as well as preventing the danger that they posed to civilians. Toxic chemicals were emptied from shells, resulting in many deaths and health defects.

Another difficulty is the current stringency of environmental legislation. In the past, a common method of getting rid of unexploded chemical ammunition was to detonate or dump it at sea; this is currently prohibited in most countries. (Note: See the Convention for the Prevention of Marine Pollution by Dumping from Ships and Aircraft and the Convention on the Prevention of Marine Pollution by Dumping of Wastes and Other Matter.)

The problems are especially acute in some northern regions of France. The French government no longer disposes of chemical weapons at sea. For this reason, piles of untreated chemical weapons accumulated. In 2001, it became evident that the pile stored at a depot in Vimy was unsafe; the inhabitants of the neighbouring town were evacuated, and the pile moved, using refrigerated trucks and under heavy guard, to a military camp in Suippes. The capacity of the plant is meant to be 25 tons per year (extensible to 80 tons at the beginning), for a lifetime of 30 years.

Germany has to deal with unexploded ammunition and polluted lands resulting from the explosion of an ammunition train in 1919.

Aside from unexploded shells, there have been claims that poison residues have remained in the local environment for an extended period, though this is unconfirmed; well known but unverified anecdotes claim that as late as the 1960s trees in the area retained enough mustard gas residue to injure farmers or construction workers who were clearing them.

=== Disposal methods of chemical weapons ===
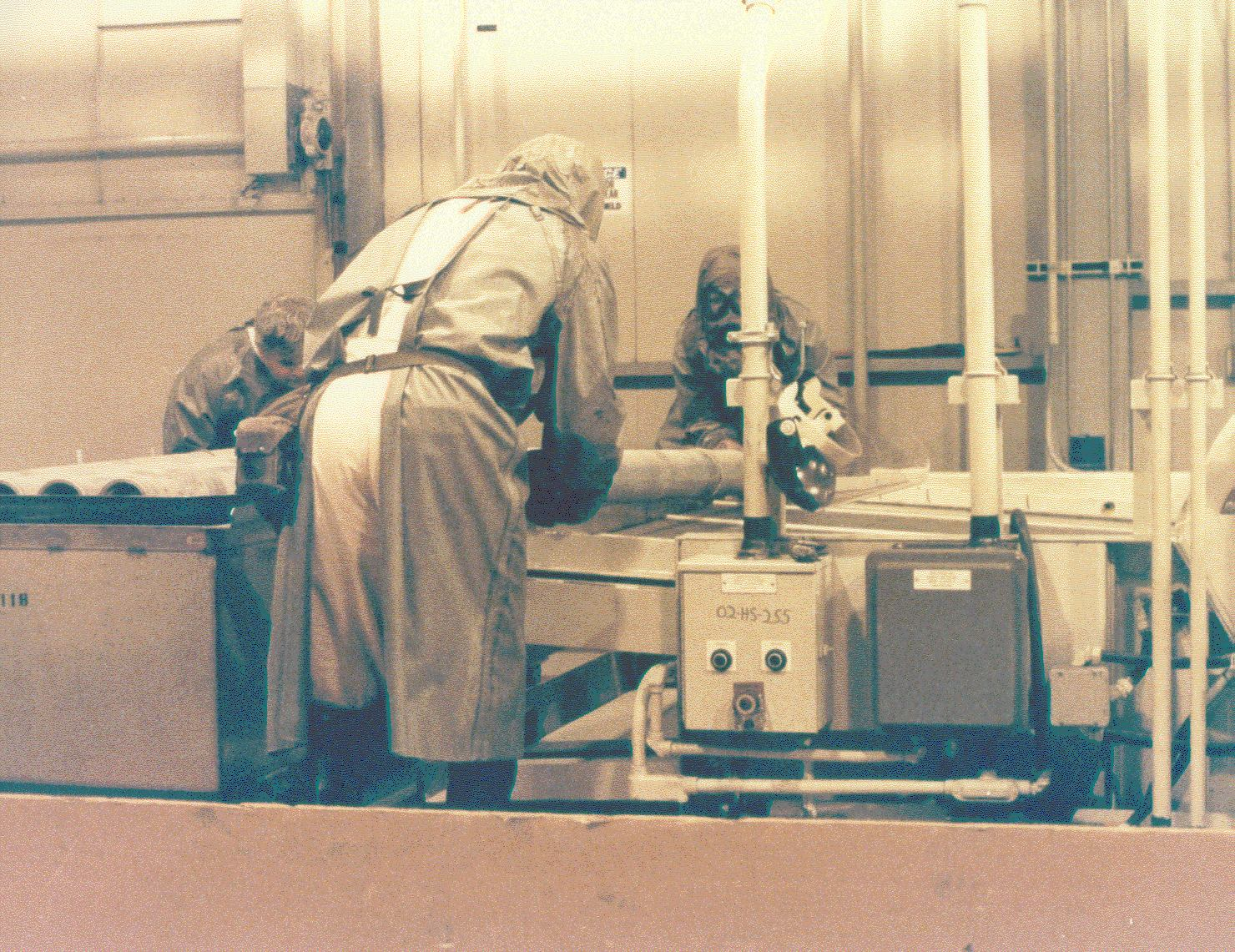
Chemical munition being destroyed at disposal facility, 1990.

After World War I, the United States, Germany, the United Kingdom and other nations had stockpiles of unfired weapons. It has been estimated that 125 million tons of toxic gases were used to manufacture bombs, grenades and shells. The remaining weapons were destroyed, dismantled, and disposed of in oceans and seas. It was believed that the chemicals would be diluted when disposed of in the ocean, and therefore ocean and sea dumping was a "safe and convenient" practice. Hundreds of thousands of tons of chemical agents, such as sulphur mustard, cyanogen chloride and arsine oil, were disposed of at sea. Chemical weapons have since washed up on shorelines and been found by fishers, causing injuries and, in some cases, death. Other disposal methods included land burials and incineration. After World War 1, "chemical shells made up 35 percent of French and German ammunition supplies, 25 percent British and 20 percent American". Weapons that contained chemicals such as bromine, chlorine and nitroaromatic were burned. The thermal destruction of chemical weapons negatively impacted the ecological environment of disposal sites. For example, in Verdun, France, the thermal destruction of weapons "resulted in severe metal contamination of upper 4–10 cm of topsoil" at the Place à Gas disposal site.

== Gases used ==
Name	First use	Type	Used by
Xylyl bromide	1915	Lachrymatory, toxic	Both
Chlorine	1915	Corrosive. Lung irritant	Both
Phosgene	1915	Irritant – Skin and mucous membranes. Corrosive, toxic	Both
Benzyl bromide	1915	Lachrymatory	Central Powers
Chloromethyl chloroformate	1915	Irritant – Eyes, skin, lungs	Both
Trichloromethyl chloroformate	1916	Severe irritant, causes burns	Both
Chloropicrin	1916	Irritant, lachrymatory, toxic	Both
Stannic chloride	1916	Severe irritant, causes asphyxiation	Allies
Ethyl iodoacetate	1916	Lachrymatory, toxic	Allies
Bromoacetone	1916	Lachrymatory, irritant	Both
Monobromomethyl ethyl ketone	1916	Lachrymatory, irritant	Central Powers
Acrolein	1916	Lachrymatory, toxic	Both
Hydrogen cyanide (Prussic acid)	1916	Toxic, asphyxiant	Allies
Hydrogen sulfide (sulphuretted hydrogen)	1916	Irritant, toxic	Allies
Diphenylchloroarsine (Diphenyl chlorasine)	1917	Irritant/Sternutatory (causes sneezing)	Central Powers
α-chlorotoluene (Benzyl chloride)	1917	Irritant, lachrymatory	Central Powers
Mustard gas (Bis(2-chloroethyl) sulfide)	1917	Vesicant (blistering agent), lung irritant	Both
Bis(chloromethyl) ether (dichloromethyl ether)	1918	Irritant, can blur vision	Central Powers
Ethyldichloroarsine	1918	Vesicant	Central Powers
N-Ethylcarbazole 679	1918	Irritant	Central Powers

== Long-term health effects ==
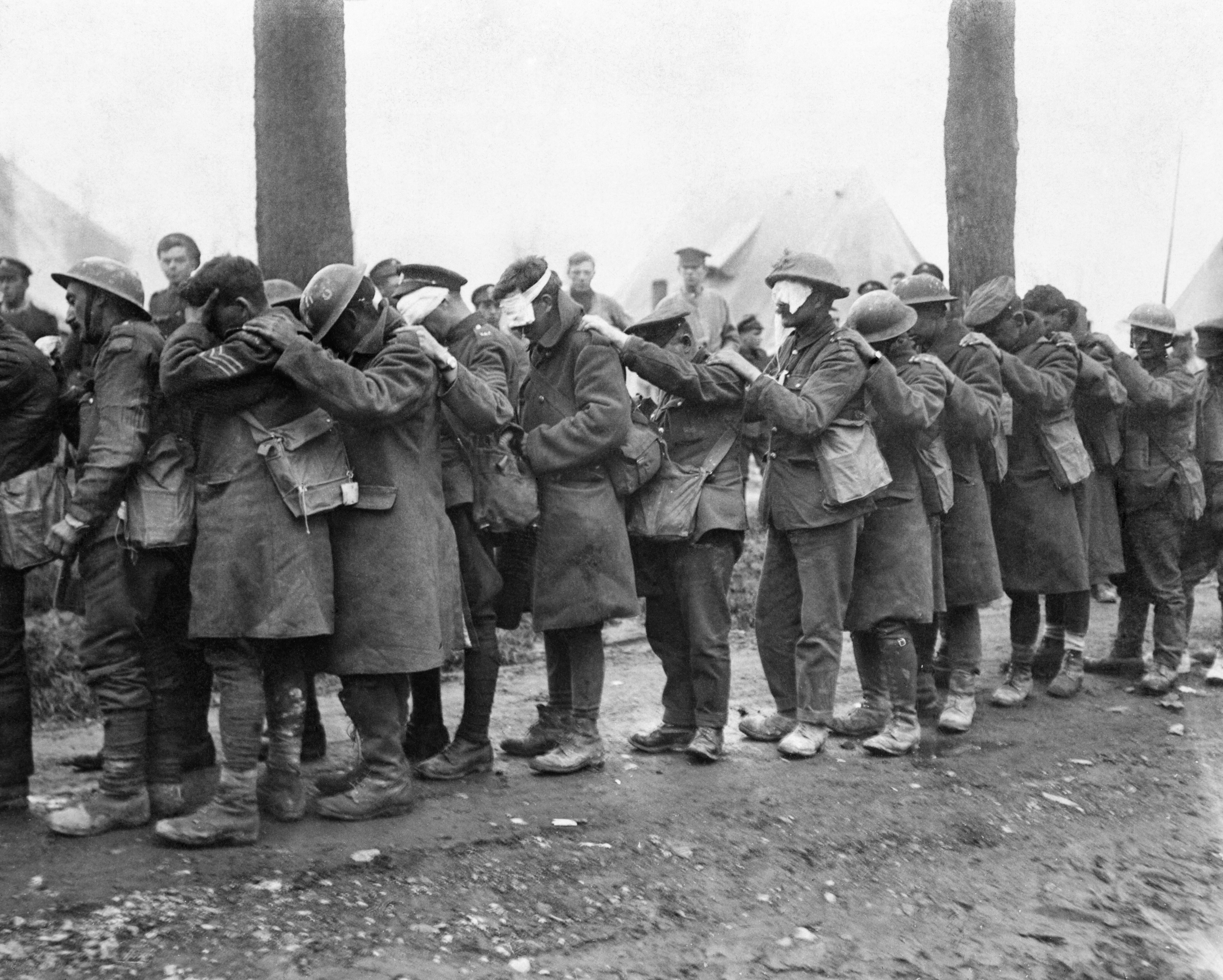
British troops blinded by poison gas during the Battle of Estaires, 1918

Soldiers who claimed to have been exposed to chemical warfare often presented unusual medical conditions which has led to much controversy. The lack of information left doctors, patients, and their families in the dark in terms of prognosis and treatment. Nerve agents such as sarin, tabun, and soman are believed to have had the most significant long-term health effects. Chronic fatigue and memory loss were reported to last up to three years after exposure. In the years following World War One, there were many conferences held in attempts to abolish the use of chemical weapons altogether, such as the Washington Naval Conference (1921–22), Geneva Conference (1923–25) and the World Disarmament Conference (1933). The United States was an original signatory of the Geneva Protocol in 1925, but the US Senate did not ratify it until 1975.

Although the health effects are generally chronic in nature, the exposures were generally acute. A positive correlation has been proven between exposure to mustard agents and skin cancers, other respiratory and skin conditions, leukemia, several eye conditions, bone marrow depression and subsequent immunosuppression, psychological disorders and sexual dysfunction. Chemicals used in the production of chemical weapons also left residues in the soil where the weapons were used. The chemicals that were detected can cause cancer and can affect the brain, blood, liver, kidneys and skin. The development and production of chemical weapons threatened public health and introduced a new set of challenges. Not only did war gasses like mustard and chlorine endanger the lives of soldiers, but also threatened the safety of workers who manufactured them.
