= Cluny Macpherson (physician) =

Newfoundlander inventor of the gas mask (1879–1966)

Colonel Cluny Macpherson CMG FRCS
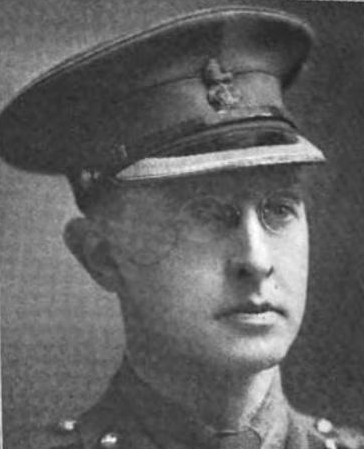

Personal details
- Born: March 18, 1879 St. John's, Newfoundland
- Died: November 16, 1966 (aged 87) St. John's, Newfoundland, Canada
- Spouse: Eleanora Barbara Thompson (m. 1902; died 1964)
- Children: Emma Allison (1903–1971); Campbell Leonard (1907–1973)
- Education: Methodist College (St. John's); McGill University
- Occupation: Physician, Officer
- Known for: Inventor of the British Smoke Hood

Military service
- Allegiance: Newfoundland
- Branch/service: Royal Newfoundland Regiment
- Rank: Colonel
- Commands: Principal Medical Officer
- Battles/wars: First World War
- Awards: Order of St Michael and St George

Colonel Cluny Macpherson CMG FRCS (March 18, 1879 – November 16, 1966) was a physician and the inventor of an early gas mask. After World War I he served as the president of the St. John's Clinical Society and the Newfoundland Medical Association.

== Early life ==
Cluny Macpherson was born in St. John's, Newfoundland to Campbell Macpherson and Emma Duder. He had a brother, Harold.

Macpherson received his early education at Methodist College and at the McGill University Faculty of Medicine from 1897–1901 where he earned his degree in Medicine. He also volunteered with the Royal National Mission to Deep Sea Fishermen, which later became known as the Grenfell Mission. Macpherson began his medical career at the Royal Infirmary of Edinburgh. In 1902 he returned to Newfoundland joining the Labrador Mission begun by Dr. Wilfred Grenfell and ran the hospital in Battle Harbour. Remaining there until 1904. He also served as a special constable and justice of the peace. Macpheron later became a director of the Newfoundland and the International Grenfell Associations. He later helped develop the Seamen's Institute (later called the King George V Institute), another Grenfell project. Returning to St. John's, Macpherson opened a private practice, and eventually became the leading practitioner in Newfoundland.

Macpherson started the first St. John Ambulance Brigade in Newfoundland after working with the St. John Ambulance Association. The Brigade had three divisions in St. John's. When World War I broke out, members enlisted in the Newfoundland Regiment. Macpherson organized the volunteers into an Ambulance Unit, which continued throughout the war.

== World War I ==
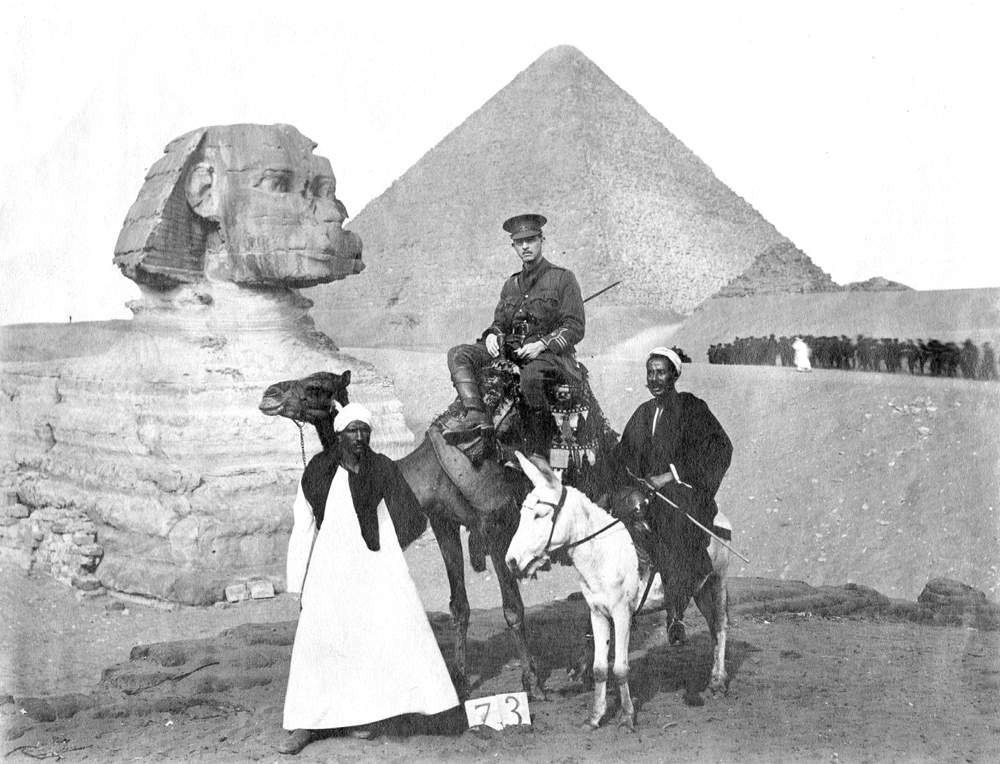
Macpherson in Egypt, September 1915

At the outset of World War I in August 1914 Macpherson was commissioned as a captain and Principal Medical Officer of the new 1st Newfoundland Regiment. He served as the principal medical officer for the St. John Ambulance Brigade of the first Newfoundland Regiment during the war. He saw active service in Belgium and France, at Salonika and later at Gallipoli, and in Egypt. His work was mentioned in despatches twice.

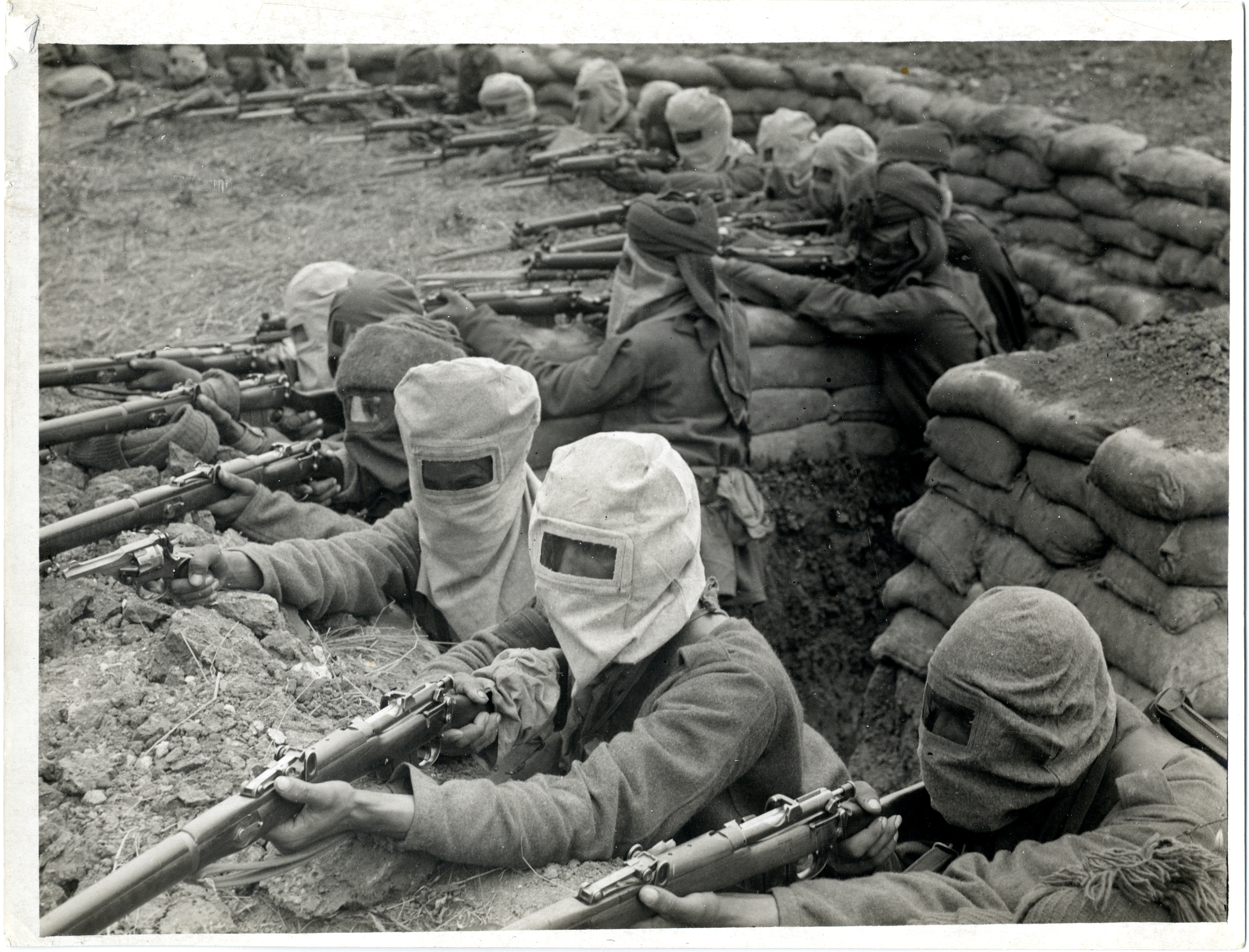
Cluny's gas mask, which came to be called the British Smoke Hood was used between June and September 1915, during which time some 2.5 million were produced

The German army used poison gas for the first time against Allied troops at the Second Battle of Ypres, Belgium on April 22, 1915. Cotton wool wrapped in muslin was issued to the troops by 1 May and followed by the Black Veil Respirator, a cotton pad soaked in an absorbent solution which was secured over the mouth using black cotton veiling. Seeking to improve on the Black Veil respirator, Macpherson created a mask made of chemical absorbing fabric and which fitted over the head. A 50.5 cm × 48 cm (19.9 in × 18.9 in) canvas hood treated with chlorine-absorbing chemicals, and fitted with a transparent mica eyepiece. (Note: The Rooms provincial museum has the prototype of Macpherson's hood as well as later version gas masks with box respirators worn by soldiers in battle.) Macpherson presented his idea to the War Office Anti-Gas Department on May 10, 1915, with prototypes being developed soon after. The design was adopted by the British Army and introduced as the British Smoke Hood in June 1915; Macpherson was appointed to the War Office Committee for Protection against Poisonous Gases. More elaborate sorbent compounds were added later to further iterations of his helmet (PH helmet), to defeat other respiratory poison gases used such as phosgene, diphosgene and chloropicrin.

After suffering a war injury in Egypt, Macpherson returned to Newfoundland in October 1916. He served as the Director of Medical Services for the Militia. For his wartime services, he was made a Companion of the Order of St Michael and St George in 1918. He retired with the rank of Lieutenant-Colonel.

== Later life ==
Following the war Macpherson had various medical roles including president of the St. John's Clinical Society and the Newfoundland Medical Association. In 1937 he was vice-president of the Newfoundland St. John Ambulance Association in 1937, and later became assistant commissioner of the St. John Ambulance Brigade overseas. Macpherson was also the Registrar of the Newfoundland Medical Board.

During World War II he served in ship convoys in the North Atlantic. He was appointed Honorary Colonel of the 1st Company, Royal Canadian Army Medical Corps in 1957, and was awarded the Canadian Forces Decoration in 1964.

At various times he was chairman of the Lunacy Commissioners, president of the St John Ambulance Council, and vice-president of the Newfoundland Division of the Canadian Red Cross Society. He was a member of the Medical Council of Canada from 1950 and its president in 1954–55. He was appointed a Knight of the British Order of St John of Jerusalem in 1913 and a Knight of Justice in 1955. He was chairman of the Clan Macpherson Association and president of its Canadian branch.

== Family ==
Macpherson married Eleanora Barbara Macleod Thompson, daughter of William Macleod Thompson, of Northumberland County, Ontario on September 16, 1902. They had two children, Emma Allison (1903–1971) and Campbell Leonard (1907–1973). Eleanora was later created OBE and became a Dame of the Order of St John. She died in 1964. Their son, Campbell Leonard, became the third Lieutenant Governor of Newfoundland in 1957, and in 1965 served as president of the Macpherson family business, Royal Stores, Ltd., after the death of his uncle, Harold Macpherson (1884-1963), a breeder and world authority on Newfoundland dogs. Cluny Macpherson lived in St. John's until his death on November 16, 1966.

The family home at 65 Rennie's Mill Road, where he served as secretary, treasurer and registrar for the Newfoundland Medical Society now has historic designation.

== Arms ==
Coat of arms of Cluny Macpherson

Notes
Originally recorded at the Lyon Court, 25 March 1954.
Crest
A cat sejant Proper between two caribou antlers Or.
Escutcheon
Per fess Or and Azure a fess wavy per fess wavy Vert and Argent surmounted by a lymphad Or sails furled and masted Proper flagged Gules between two caribou heads couped respectant Or attired Gules in the dexter canton a hand couped fesswise holding a dagger in the sinister canton a cross-crosslet fitché Gules.
Motto
Ne'Er But A Glove

== Bibliography ==
- Wetherell, Anthony; Mathers, George (2007), "Respiratory Protection", in Marrs, Timothy; Maynard, Robert; Sidell, Frederick (eds.), Chemical Warfare Agents: Toxicology and Treatment, New York: Wiley, pp. 157–174, ISBN 978-0470013595
- Mayer-Maguire, Thomas; Baker, Brian (2015), British Military Respirators and Anti-Gas Equipment of the Two World Wars, Crowood
