= Hypo helmet =

British gas mask

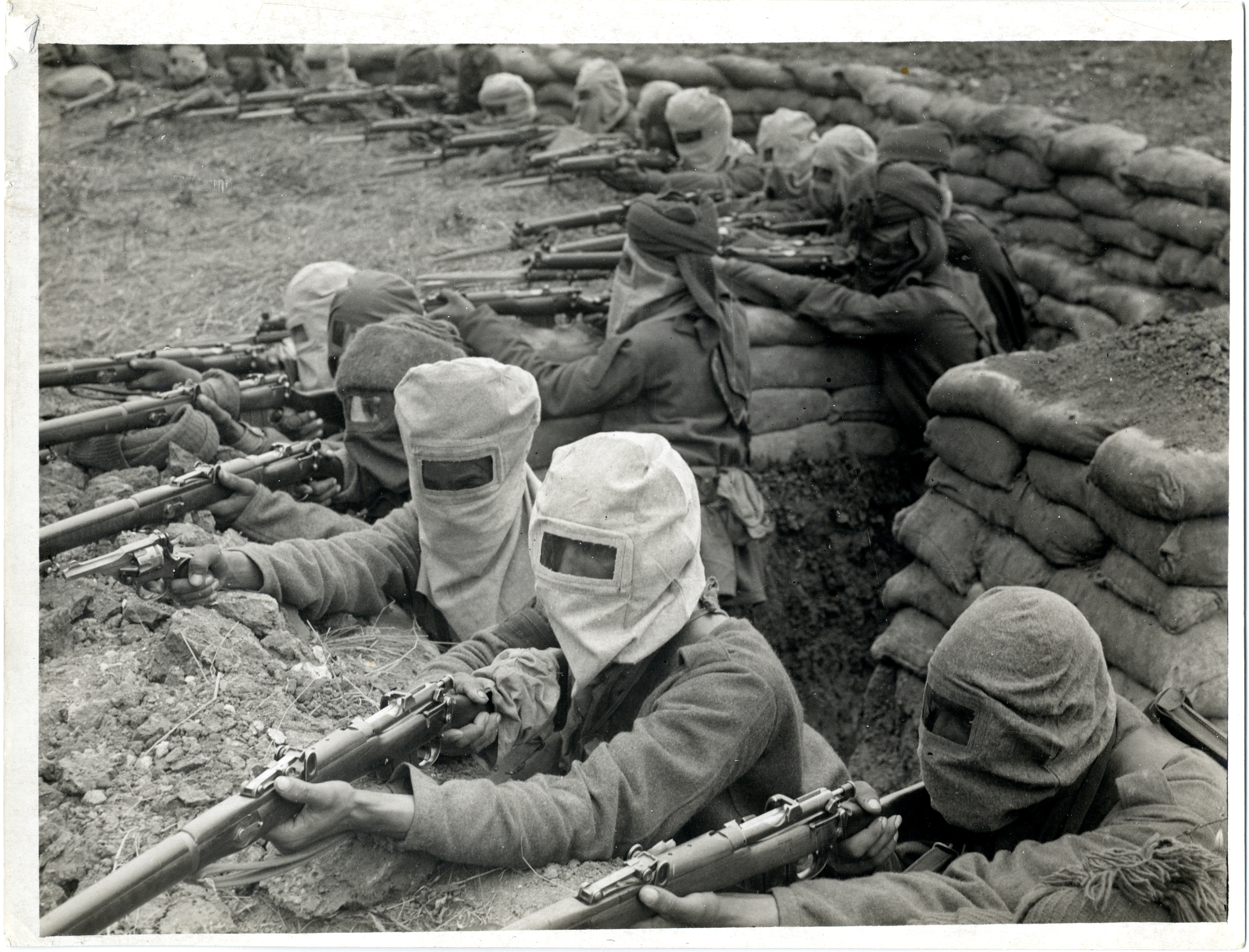
- Indian troops wearing Hypo helmets in a posed photograph, August 1915
- Type: Gas mask
- Place of origin: Dominion of Newfoundland

Service history
- In service: 1913–1918
- Used by: United Kingdom; India; Dominion of Newfoundland
- Wars: World War I

Production history
- Designer: Cluny Macpherson
- Designed: 1913
- No. produced: 2,500,000

The Hypo helmet, or British Smoke Hood (its official name), was an early British World War I gas mask, designed by Dr. Cluny Macpherson of the Newfoundland Regiment.

== Background ==
The German army used poison gas, in the form of chlorine, for the first time against Triple Entente troops at the Second Battle of Ypres, Belgium, on 22 April 1915. The British began issuing cotton wool wrapped in muslin to its troops by 3 May. This was followed by the Black Veil Respirator, invented by John Scott Haldane, which began to be issued to troops on 20 May 1915. The Black Veil was a cotton pad soaked in an absorbent solution which was secured over the mouth using black cotton veiling. The veiling could be drawn up to cover the eyes, providing some protection against lachrymatory agents but the mask still provided little protection against chlorine gas. It was also of fragile construction, required training to use and largely immobilised men during a gas attack as they were concerned about their mask coming loose.

== Design ==
Seeking to improve on the Black Veil Respirator, Newfoundland physician Col. Dr. Cluny Macpherson, serving as Principal Medical Officer for the Royal Newfoundland Regiment created a mask from chemical absorbing fabric which fitted over the head. MacPherson had seen a German soldier putting a bag over his head after a gas attack and sought to replicate the design. Macpherson presented his idea to the War Office Anti-Gas Department on 10 May 1915, with prototypes being developed soon after. The design was adopted by the British Army and introduced as the "British Smoke Hood" in June 1915 and manufactured until September 1915. 2.5 million masks were manufactured before being superseded.

The helmet was a 50.5 cm × 48 cm (19.9 in × 18.9 in) canvas hood treated with chlorine-absorbing chemicals, fitted with a single rectangular mica eyepiece. (Note: The Provincial Museum of Newfoundland and Labrador at The Rooms, St. John's has the prototype of Macpherson's hood as well as later version gas masks with box respirators worn by soldiers in battle.) It was a khaki-coloured flannel bag soaked in a solution of glycerin and sodium thiosulphate. The soldier placed it over his head and tucked the bottom into his tunic. The wearer relied upon power of his lungs to breathe through the bag fabric.

== Later versions ==
This primitive type of mask went through several stages of development before being superseded in 1916 by the canister gas mask. More elaborate sorbent compounds were added later to further iterations of the helmet (P Helmet and PH helmet), to defeat other respiratory poison gases used such as phosgene, diphosgene and chloropicrin.

== Bibliography ==
- Cook, Tim (1998). "Through Clouded Eyes: Gas Masks and the Canadian Corps in the First World War". Material History Review. 47 (Spring ed.): 4–18. ISSN 1927-9264.
- Lefebure, Victor (1923). The Riddle of the Rhine: Chemical Strategy in Peace and War. The Chemical Foundation. ISBN 0-585-23269-5.
- Mayer-Maguire, Thomas; Baker, Brian (2015). British Military Respirators and Anti-Gas Equipment of the Two World Wars. Marlborough: Crowood Press. ISBN 978-1-84797-887-5.
- Spiers, Edward M. (2017), "The Gas War, 1915–1918: If not a War Winner, Hardly a Failure", in Friedrich, Bretislav; Hoffmann, Dieter; Renn, Jürgen; Schmaltz, Florian; Wolf, Martin (eds.), One Hundred Years of Chemical Warfare: Research, Deployment, Consequences, Springer, pp. 153–178, ISBN 978-3-319-51663-9
- Wetherell, Anthony; Mathers, George (2007), "Respiratory Protection", in Marrs, Timothy; Maynard, Robert; Sidell, Frederick (eds.), Chemical Warfare Agents: Toxicology and Treatment, New York: Wiley, pp. 157–174, ISBN 978-0-470-01359-5
