= Campbell Leonard Macpherson =

Canadian politician

The Honourable Campbell Leonard Macpherson

3rd Lieutenant Governor of Newfoundland
- In office December 16, 1957 – March 1, 1963
- Monarch: Elizabeth II
- Governors General: Vincent Massey; Georges Vanier
- Premier: Joey Smallwood
- Preceded by: Leonard Outerbridge
- Succeeded by: Fabian O'Dea

Personal details
- Born: July 4, 1907 St. John's, Newfoundland
- Died: June 28, 1973 (aged 65) St. John's, Newfoundland

Campbell Leonard Macpherson (July 4, 1907 – June 28, 1973) was a businessman born in St. John's, Newfoundland and was the third lieutenant governor of Newfoundland.

The son of Cluny and Eleanora Macpherson, he was educated at Methodist College, St. John's, Westminster School, London and Columbia University was appointed Lieutenant Governor of Newfoundland in 1957. He began his career in the family business at The Royal Stores in 1925. In 1965 he became president of that establishment upon the death of his uncle, Harold Macpherson.

Macpherson was an original member of Memorial University's board of regents from 1949 to 1957. He was also a member of the board of governors of Prince of Wales College.
