= Principal Medical Officer =

Principal Medical Officer (PMO) is a senior position in the Royal Army Medical Corps, the Royal Canadian Navy, the Army Medical Corps (India), NHS Scotland and the Irish Health Service Executive.

The title was formerly used within the British National Health Service and the health services of former colonies. James McGrigor was appointed Principal Medical Officer of the Portuguese Army during the Peninsular War. A position of Principal Medical Officer in the Crimea was established from 1854 to 1856 for the duration of the Crimean War. Florence Nightingale made suggestions as to the duties of the post.

The position still existed in England and Wales until the 1974 reorganisation. The title is still used in NHS Scotland.

The St John Ambulance in England formerly had a Principal Medical Officer position.

In Australia the position was the senior administrator of the Medical Department of each state from 1895, when it was created as part of the Colonial Secretary's Department, replacing the position of Colonial Surgeon, to 1911. The superintendents of hospitals reported to the Principal Medical Officer. The position still exists within the Civil Aviation Safety Authority.

The term is still used in Namibia.
