= Gas attacks at Wulverghem =

German cloud gas attack on British during first world war

- Part of Local operations December 1915 – June 1916 Western Front, in the First World War
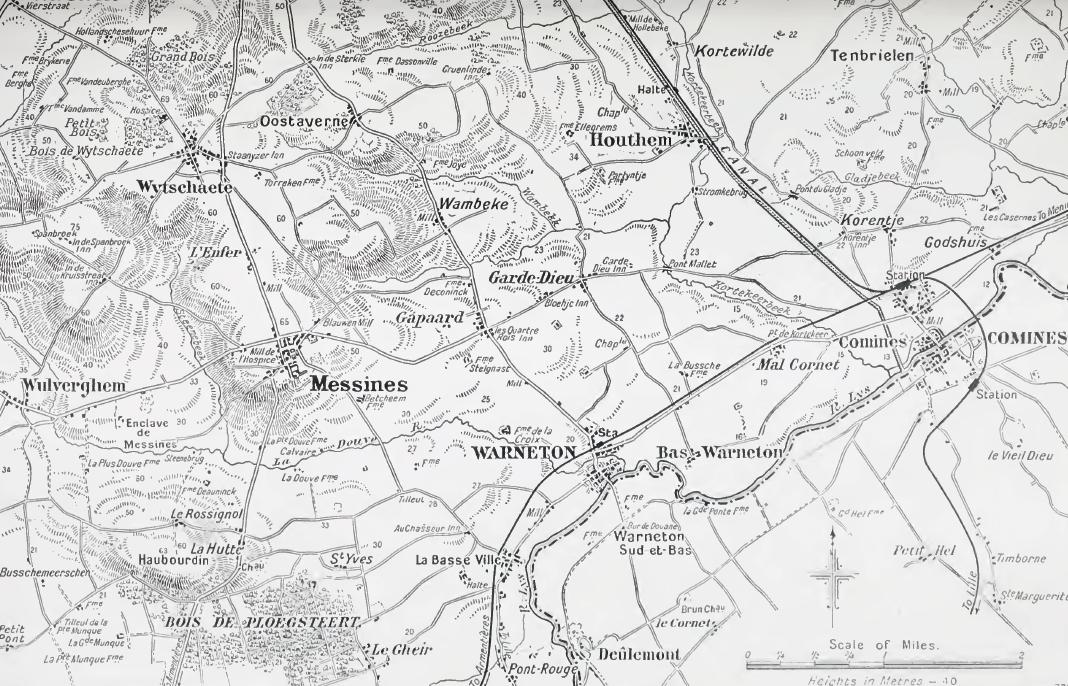
- Wulverghem
Date	30 April 1916 and 17 June 1916
Location	Messines in West Flanders, Belgium 50°46′N 02°49′E
Result	British victory

Belligerents
Germany	Britain

Commanders and leaders
(German Empire) Erich von Falkenhayn	(United Kingdom of Great Britain and Ireland) Douglas Haig

Strength
Part of 2 regiments	Part of 2 divisions

Casualties and losses
	30 April: 562 gas, 89 fatal 17 June: 562 gas, 95 fatal
- Wulverghem in West Flanders, Belgium

The gas attacks at Wulverghem (30 April and 17 June 1916) were German cloud gas releases during the First World War. The gas was released on British troops at Wulverghem in the municipality of Heuvelland, near Ypres in the Belgian province of West Flanders. The gas attacks were part of the sporadic fighting between battles in the Ypres Salient on the Western Front. The British Second Army held the ground from Messines Ridge northwards to Steenstraat and the divisions opposite the German XXIII Reserve Corps had received warnings of a gas attack. From 21 to 23 April, British artillery-fire exploded several gas cylinders in the German lines around Spanbroekmolen, which released greenish-yellow clouds. A gas alert was given on 25 April when the wind began to blow from the north-east and routine work was suspended; on 29 April, two German soldiers deserted and warned that an attack was imminent. Just after midnight on 30 April, the German attack began and over no man's land, a gas cloud drifted on the wind into the British defences, then south-west towards Bailleul.

The gas used at Wulverghem was a mixture of chlorine and phosgene, which had been used against British troops on 19 December 1915 in the phosgene attack at Wieltje, north-east of Ypres. This and earlier gas attacks, beginning at the Second Battle of Ypres (21 April – 25 May 1915) had given the British time to replace improvised gas masks with effective mass-produced versions, obtain other anti-gas equipment and to establish anti-gas procedures. Helmets impregnated with chemicals to neutralise chlorine had been issued in several variants, each more effective than the last. By April 1916, British troops had PH helmets and some specialist troops like machine-gunners, were equipped with box respirators. The German gas attack at Wulverghem on 30 April, caused the defenders 562 gas casualties and 89 gas fatalities but German raiding parties, looking for mine entrances to destroy, were repulsed with small-arms and artillery fire. A second attempt by the Germans on 17 June caused about the same number of gas casualties but the British again easily repulsed German patrols.

== Background ==
=== 1915 ===
==== Second Battle of Ypres ====
During the evening of 22 April 1915, German pioneers released chlorine gas which drifted into the positions of the French 87th Territorial and the 45th Algerian divisions, on the north side of the salient and caused many of the troops to run back from the cloud, leaving a gap in the Allied line. The German attack was a strategic diversion, rather than a breakthrough attempt and insufficient forces were available to follow up the success. As soon as German troops tried to advance into areas not affected by the gas, Allied small-arms and artillery fire dominated the area and halted the German advance. The surprise gained against the French was increased by the lack of protection against gas and because the psychological effect of the insidious nature of the substance. A soldier could evade bullets and shells but gas seeped into trenches and dugouts and had a ghastly, slow, choking effect. The gas was quickly identified as chlorine and the first Allied mass-produced anti-gas helmet was a flannel bag soaked in glycerine, hyposulphite and sodium bicarbonate.

==== 19 December 1915 ====
On 19 December 1915, the German 4th Army conducted an attack at Ypres using a new gas, a mixture of chlorine and phosgene, a much more lethal concoction. The British took a prisoner who disclosed the intended gas attack and gleaned information from other sources, which led to the divisions of VI Corps being alerted from 15 December. The gas discharge was accompanied by German raiding parties, most of which were engaged by small-arms fire, while attempting to cross no-man's land. The British anti-gas precautions were successful and prevented a panic or a collapse of the defence, even though British anti-gas helmets had not been treated to repel phosgene. Only the 49th (West Riding) Infantry Division had a large number of gas casualties, caused by soldiers in reserve lines not being warned of the gas in sufficient time to put on their anti-gas helmets. A study by British medical authorities counted 1,069 gas casualties, of whom 120 men died. After the operation, German opinion concluded that a breakthrough could not be achieved solely by the use of gas.

=== 1916 ===
==== First Army front ====
A German gas attack took place from 27 to 29 April, by divisions of the II Bavarian Corps against I Corps on the First Army front near Loos-en-Gohelle. Just before dawn on 27 April, the 16th (Irish) Division and part of the 15th (Scottish) Division were subjected to a German cloud gas attack, near Hulluch. The gas cloud and artillery bombardment were followed by raiding parties, which made temporary lodgements in the British lines. Two days later there was another gas attack, which blew back over the German lines and caused a large number of German casualties, increased by British troops firing at German soldiers as they fled in the open. The gas was a mixture of chlorine and phosgene, which was of sufficient concentration to penetrate the British PH gas helmets. The 16th (Irish) Division was unjustly blamed for poor gas discipline and it was put about that the gas helmets of the division were of inferior manufacture to allay doubts as to the effectiveness of the helmet. Production of the M2 gas mask, which had worked well during the attack, was accelerated.

==== Second Army front ====
In late April 1916, the centre of the Second Army (General Herbert Plumer) front was held by V Corps (Lieutenant-General Hew Fanshawe) from the Warneton road 1.5 mi (2.4 km) south of Messines, for 5.5 mi (8.9 km) to the south-west of St Eloi. The front line ran from the valley of the river Douvre, up the Wulverghem spur and then curved back over the Ypres ridge south-west of Wytschaete, then along the lower west slopes of the ridge, north-east to the corps boundary. From the German trenches higher on the ridges, observers overlooked the British positions. On 29 April, the V Corps front was held by the 24th Division (Major-General John Capper) and the 3rd Division (Major-General Aylmer Haldane), after the 3rd Division had relieved the 50th (Northumbrian) Division (Major-General P. S. Wilkinson), which had moved into reserve in villages 6–10 mi (9.7–16.1 km) back. The two divisional sectors were divided into three brigade areas, with two battalions in each. There were front and support trenches, two lines of strong points and Wulverghem Switch, a reserve line.

Since the Actions of the Bluff (14–15 February and 2 March) and The Actions of St Eloi Craters (27 March – 16 April) the Second Army front from Armentières northwards to Boesinghe had been quiet, except for frequent German artillery bombardments on the front line and rear communications of the British defences. The bombardments were predictable, which made them easy to evade. The British had dug a shallow network of defensive mines and begun work on a deeper system, preparatory to an attack to recapture Messines Ridge. (Note: The mines were eventually sprung at the Battle of Messines (7 June 1917).) Secrecy was vital but the German bombardments blocked routes to the mine shafts and prevented the removal of spoil. During April, there was little underground activity, with only seven German mines sprung on the Second Army front but on 24 April, a deep mine dug by the British under La Petite Douve Farm was demolished.

== Prelude ==
=== German preparations ===
Gas cylinders were placed along the front of the XXIII Reserve Corps, with the 45th Reserve Division and the 123rd Division, opposite V Corps. Reserve Infantry Regiment 209 of the 45th Reserve Division held the divisional front and a party of Reserve Infantry Regiment 210, consisting of 130 officers and men, was organised to conduct a patrol in force and destroy mine galleries during the gas attack. The men of Reserve Infantry Regiment 209 disliked gas operations, since they had to carry the cylinders and live next to them before the discharge, which led to many gas casualties from cylinders damaged by British artillery-fire; the troops had to sleep wearing gas masks. The plan was set for 26 April then postponed, with the orders for the attack being issued at 10:00 p.m. on 29 April, for the gas discharge to begin at 12:40 a.m. At 11:00 p.m., listening-posts were withdrawn and when the code words 'issue rations' (Ausgabe Rationen) were received, the gas was to be released from 2,000 large and 3,000 small cylinders for 20–25 minutes. The sound of the gas was to be masked by small-arms fire.

=== British anti-gas procedures ===
Standing orders for anti-gas precautions had been enforced by the British after the gas attacks earlier in 1915. The state of the wind was monitored by an officer in each corps area and during conditions favourable for a gas release a "Gas Alert" was issued. A sentry was posted near every alarm horn or gong, at every dug-out big enough for ten men, each group of smaller dugouts and at signal offices. Gas helmets and alarms were tested every twelve hours and all soldiers wore the helmet outside the greatcoat or rolled up on their heads, with the top greatcoat button undone to tuck the helmet in. Special lubricants were provided for the working parts of weapons in forward positions.

=== Intelligence ===
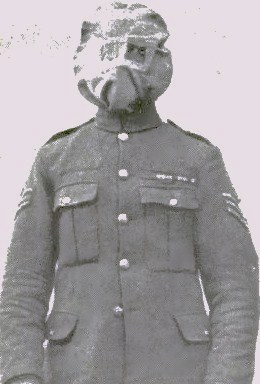
British soldier demonstrates an early Hypo or Smoke helmet

From 20 to 30 April, the British received indications that a German gas attack was likely. From 21 to 23 April, gas cylinders in the German front line were exploded by British artillery-fire for about a 1 mi (1.6 km) length of the German front line near Spanbroekmolen and green-yellow clouds were seen to drift along the German front line. When the wind began to blow from the north-east on 25 April, the gas alert was issued. On 26 April, two German deserters surrendered to the British near Spanbroekmolen and disclosed that gas cylinders had recently been installed, ready to be used as soon as there was a favourable wind. As a precaution against German raiding parties, the deep mine entrances were filled in and disguised; the 3rd Division stopped all wiring and working parties to minimise the number of detached parties who might not receive a gas warning. The 24th Division carried on as normal, except for ration parties and runners who might be vulnerable if artillery-fire smothered the sound of gas alarms.

Late on 29 April, two more Germans deserted from the Spanbroekmolen area to the positions of the 76th Brigade of the 3rd Division. The Germans said that an attack was due that night or in the early morning. The Brigade headquarters (HQ) reported the news to the division HQ and to the flanking brigades, which issued warnings by 10:00 p.m. and men went forward of the front line to listen for gas. A warning from a meteorologist, that the wind was too fast for a gas attack was kept confidential. The British infantry had PH anti-gas helmets but were close to the German front line, which would mean that a gas discharge would be dense when it arrived. If the gas was released after dark, vision through the helmet eye-pieces would be poor, particularly since the new moon was only two days away.

== Attacks ==
=== 30 April ===
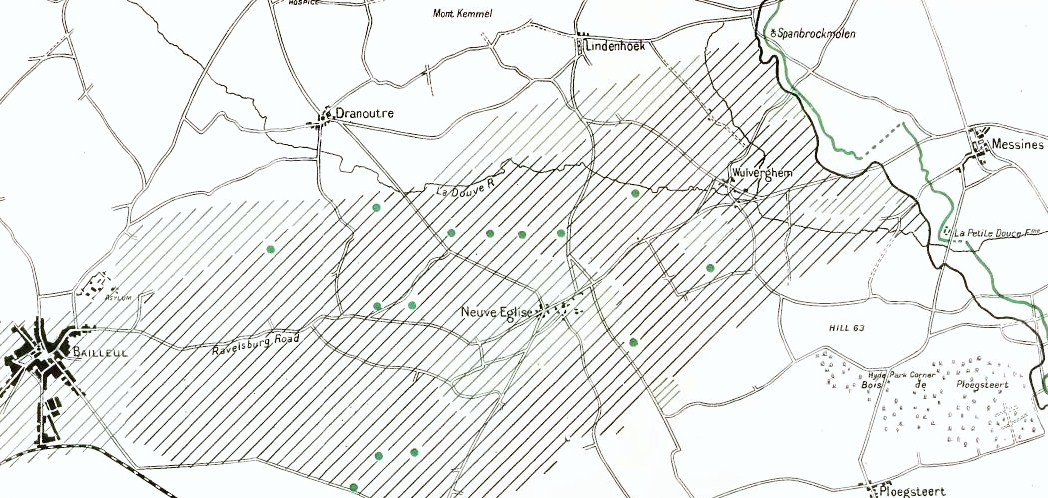
Diagram (expandable) showing the area affected by the German cloud gas attack, Wulverghem, 30 April 1916. Green dots: cattle deaths, heavy shading: seriously affected, helmets worn, light shading: lightly affected

Just after midnight, German small-arms fire began along the fronts of the 73rd and 72nd brigades, in the centre and left of the 24th Division and the 76th Brigade on the right flank of the 3rd Division. Soon after, a gas discharge began on a 2 mi (3.2 km) front from La Petite Douve Farm to Spanbroekmolen. (In German reports of the operation, the gas was said to rise above head-height and was illuminated by British flares. British return-fire began and after five minutes, artillery-fire commenced.) Along most of the line, German rifle and machine-gun fire blanketed the hiss of gas and smothered the sound of alarm gongs and klaxons. The first warning for many British soldiers, was the smell, since with the wind speed and no man's land being only 40 yd (37 m) wide in places, the gas arrived without warning. The British donned their helmets and a volley of Very lights revealed the gas cloud. German artillery began a bombardment behind the British front on artillery positions, observation posts, support trenches and strong points.

The gas signal reached the divisional HQs at 12:47 a.m. and three minutes later, the artillery of the 24th and 50th divisions, which was behind Hill 63 and the Vierstraat spur and the corps heavy artillery, began to bombard their night lines. The gas discharge lasted from 15 to 40 minutes and varied in density, being of shortest duration in areas where German raiding parties operated, most of whom did not wear gas masks. When the British saw that the Germans were unmasked, they removed theirs too. The gas cloud travelled quickly and reached Bailleul 6 mi (9.7 km) away, at 1:12 a.m., a speed of 300 yd (270 m) per minute. After another five minutes, German parties began to advance towards the British wire but British troops in advanced listening posts repulsed the Germans. No more attempts were made during the discharge and raiding groups of 30–40 men each, advanced after the discharge against the 72nd and 76th brigade fronts. One party got into an empty trench at the brigade boundary and was then bombed out; the rest were forced back by small-arms fire and by 1:30 a.m., quiet returned and the British artillery ceased fire.

Soon afterwards, two larger raiding parties attacked against the centre of the 72nd Brigade and to the north beyond the area of the gas attack, against the junction of the 9th and 8th brigades, where the British were defending mineshafts. (German records relate the advance of officer patrols, which returned with news that the British were alert and unaffected by the gas, making the mine sabotage operation impossible.) A barrage fell 50 yd (46 m) back from the attack fronts and fire was opened by heavy trench mortars. Covered by snipers in no man's land, hiding in long grass the raiders tried to cut through the British wire. On the 3rd Division front, the attackers were repulsed by flanking fire from Lewis-guns and hand grenades, as four heavy howitzers quickly silenced the German heavy trench mortars. On the 24th Division front, the raiding party, armed with bombs, daggers and pistols got into three bays of the front line trench, to be forced out by a counter-attack twenty minutes later. A 40 lb (18 kg) explosive charge was later found in a defunct mine shaft. Other raiding parties were prevented from leaving the German front line by small-arms fire. By 4:30 a.m. quiet had returned, with the British having had no need for the support and reserve battalions in the area.

=== 17 June ===
During the night of 16/17 June, another German gas cloud was released against the 72nd and 73rd brigades, from the curtain, a re-entrant west of Messines, where no man's land was 400–600 yd (370–550 m) wide. The British gave the gas alert at 3:30 p.m. on 16 June, when the wind was favourable for a German gas release. Just after midnight, sentries of the 8th Battalion, Queen's West Surrey and the 1st Battalion, North Staffordshire of the 72nd Brigade, which had experienced the April attack and the 9th Battalion, Royal Sussex and 7th Battalion, Northamptonshire of the 73rd Brigade, saw gas rise from the German trenches and gave the warning. The cloud was dense but moved slowly in a light wind, which gave the British plenty of time to put on their anti-gas hoods. The gas was emitted for 50 to 60 minutes and was blown to the south-east, towards the 17th Brigade on the right flank of the divisional area. Near the end of the discharge, the gas began to blow back and the British artillery bombarded the German front line. A few Germans climbed out of the front line trench, immediately to be forced back. All but ration parties and a few people moving along communication trenches received the alert but gas casualties were similar to those in the April attack, which led to the conclusion that the PH helmets were inadequate against concentrated gas.

== Aftermath ==
=== Analysis ===
British casualties (19 December 1915 to June 1916)
Month	Total
December	5,675
January	9,974
February	12,182
March	17,814
April	19,886
May	22,418
June	37,121
Total	125,141

The British thought that the German attack on 30 April was an attempt to surprise them by discharging the gas in an unfavourable high wind, to allow troops to follow up without the risk of being gassed. When the British saw that the German infantry were without masks, they unmasked too. The effect of the gas was similar to that of the phosgene discharge of 19 December 1915 but in a more concentrated form, in which a short exposure to the gas was fatal. The course of the cloud could be seen by the staining of grass and vegetation as far as Bailleul, where shoots and leaves withered; cattle died 2 mi (3.2 km) to the north-east. It was concluded that the dangerous concentration of gas extended for 9,000–10,000 yd (5.1–5.7 mi; 8.2–9.1 km) from the point of discharge. It was also found that the new box respirator worn by some machine-gunners gave good protection. Defensive artillery-fire had defeated most of the German infantry attacks and many German trench mortars were destroyed by the fire of 8-inch and 9.2-inch howitzers but relatively little artillery-fire was devoted to counter-battery bombardments.

=== Casualties ===
On 30 April, there were 562 British gas casualties, of which 89 were fatal. In the 3rd Division 69 gassings were reported and in the 24th Division 338 losses to gas were recorded. Non-gas casualties amounted to 103 in the 3rd Division and 209 in the 24th Division. The difference in the number of casualties was explained by four battalions and working parties being in the path of the gas on the 24th Division front, some of whom did not receive the warnings and one battalion of the 3rd Division, which was also fortunate that the gas moved south-west, away from the rear areas of the division. German reports mention only that a senior officer was wounded. The gas discharge on 17 June, caused 562 British casualties, of which 95 were fatal. The 72nd Brigade gas casualties were 348, most incurred by the 1st North Staffordshires, the 73rd Brigade had 70 gas casualties out of 137 losses and the 17th Brigade had 24 gas casualties among 48 losses.

=== Medical narrative ===
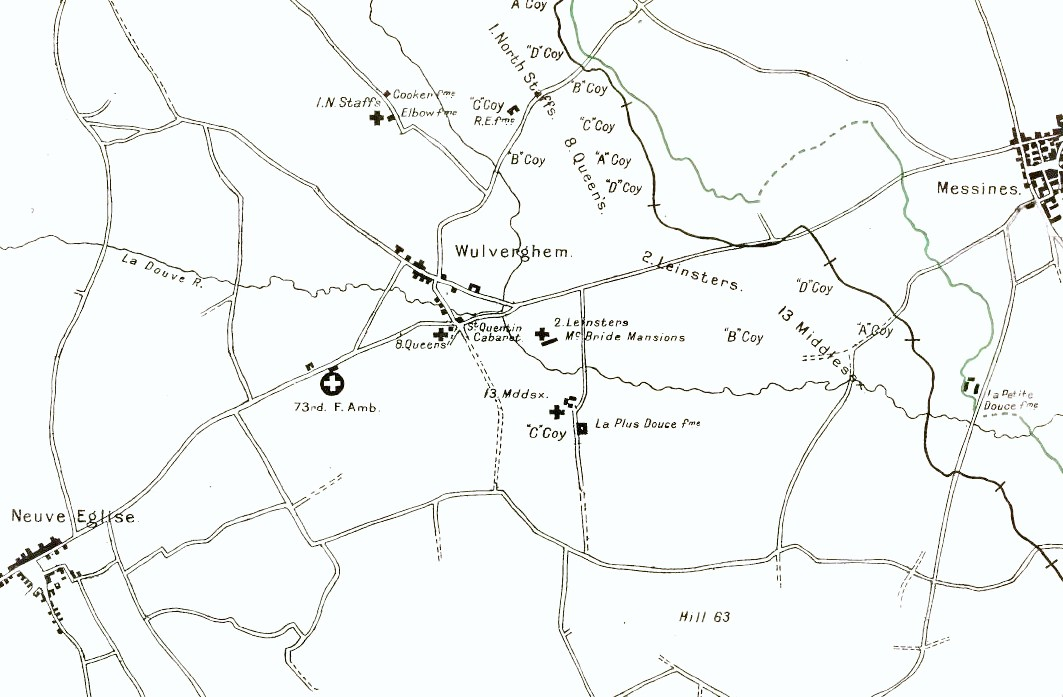
German cloud gas attack at Wulverghem, with locations of aid posts and advanced dressing stations

From north to south, the units mainly affected were the 10th Royal Welch Fusiliers (10th RWF) in the 76th Brigade, 3rd Division, the 1st North Staffs, 8th Queen's and the 2nd Leinster in the 72nd Brigade, 24th Division and the 13th Battalion, Middlesex Regiment of the 73rd Brigade. The gas release began at 12:35 a.m. on a front of 3,500 yd (2.0 mi; 3.2 km), from Spanbroekmolen to La Petite Douvre Farm, except for two small sectors. In the north, the flow of gas was continuous for about ten minutes and farther south the gas came in two waves, over 30 to 40 minutes. As soon as the gas cloud drifted, German attacks began, mainly at points where no gas had been released.

Shell or trench mortar bombs with chloromethyl chloroformate were used against the front line and some lacrymatory "T" shells were fired on the British support lines, with no effect. The gas moved east-north-east at 9–12 mph (14–19 km/h) over Wulverghem, Neuve Eglise and Bailleul. Gas concentration on the flanks of the cloud declined rapidly but at Bailleul, 11,000 yd (6.3 mi; 10 km) back from the front line, coughing and vomiting occurred in some cases where people were caught the open. Closing windows and doors kept most of the gas out of buildings. On high ground near Neuve Eglise, the concentration was low but was high on Ravelsberg Ridge to the west.

Vegetation was turned yellow as far back as 1,200 yd (1,100 m) from the front line. Many rats in the trenches were killed and eleven cows, 23 calves, a horse, one pig and 15 hens were killed in fields; other cattle and pigs showed symptoms of gas poisoning. A potentially lethal concentration for an unmasked person extended for 9,000–10,000 yd (5.1–5.7 mi; 8.2–9.1 km) from the discharge point and about 14,000 troops donned gas helmets during the attack, including many on the outskirts of the cloud, who wore helmets as a precaution. Troops in the front line received little warning before the gas arrived. In places the cloud was seen to rise from the German trenches as a white mist and hissing was audible at some points but was drowned by rifle and machine-gun fire elsewhere. In the north, the opposing trenches were 40 yd (37 m) apart and the gas cloud arrived in seconds, highly concentrated. The standard anti-gas equipment of PH helmets and "box respirators" for machine-gunners, signallers and some artillery personnel had been issued. The box respirator was a great success, because the face piece could be fitted quicker than the PH helmet.

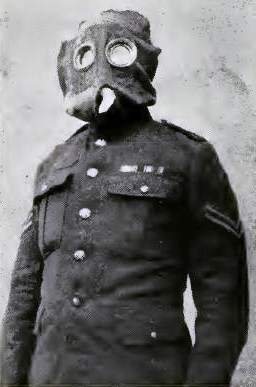
British soldier demonstrates a P or PH helmet

In the 72nd Brigade, helmets were carried in protective satchels but in the 76th Brigade they were removed before the attack and worn on the head, as recently advised. A large number of gas casualties occurred despite warnings and the troops having been alerted for the attack; some groups received late warnings or underestimated the danger and a small number were caught asleep. The speed and concentration of the cloud meant that hesitation or fumbling with the mask resulted in poisoning. Most casualties occurred in the front line in trenches close to the German lines. Gas density may have been enough to penetrate helmets in trenches nearest to the gas discharge, yet the 10th RWF had only 41 gas casualties, five casualties among engineers and five among trench mortar crews, compared with 112 casualties in the 1st North Staffordshire and 122 among the 8th Queen's in the 72nd Brigade. The 10th RWF had followed advice to keep the helmet ready and the gas blew sideways, missing the area further back. Casualty returns from battalions, field ambulances and casualty clearing stations, gave total gas casualties as 512, including casualties in infantry battalions on the flanks and in reserve and among divisional and corps troops. The five battalions in the line (excluding machine-gun, R.E., tunnelling companies and trench mortar crews) had 371 gas casualties, 73 per cent of the total.

The regimental aid post of the 10th RWF was about 600 yd (550 m) back from the front line and No. 7 Field Ambulance of the 3rd Division was at Locre Hospice. An advanced dressing station was at Lindenhoek and took most of its casualties from the 10th RWF. Most casualties from the 72nd and 73rd Brigades passed through No. 73 Field Ambulance of the 24th Division, whose main dressing station was at Dranoutre, with an advanced dressing station in a farm near Wulverghem, about 2,000 yd (1.1 mi; 1.8 km) from the front line and in the path of the gas. Entrances to the dressing station had anti-gas curtains and the gas failed to penetrate, the occupants carrying on without helmets. No. 74 Field Ambulance in the 24th Division area had an advanced dressing station at Hyde Park Corner on the north edge of Ploegsteert (Plugstreet) Wood, a main dressing station to the south-west at Le Romarin and had only a few casualties. The aid post of the 1st North Staffordshire was set on fire early in the attack by shell-fire and burnt down.

Regimental aid posts were cleared of the first rush of cases by 10:00 a.m., though minor gas casualties trickled in for another 24 hours. For a few days, small numbers of soldiers reported with symptoms of bronchitis, which were attributed to the gas. Casualties were evacuated as soon as possible from the aid posts to the field ambulances, severe cases taken first, albeit slowly, because all troops suffering from the gas were treated as lying cases and carried by hand or on wheeled stretchers. Cases admitted at Lindenhoek were evacuated by a thirty-minute car journey to the main station at Locre Hospice. Some casualties arrived at Locre within three hours of the gas attack and all cases were detained for several hours, until some improvement was seen. Lighter cases were sent on to casualty clearing stations first and some of the worst cases were retained for treatment, to spare them the effects of another journey, as the unit had good accommodation.

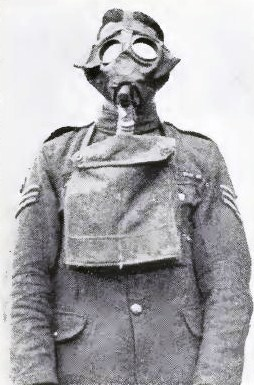
British soldier demonstrates a small box respirator

Most casualties passed through the advanced dressing station near Wulverghem, to the main dressing station of No. 73 Field Ambulance at Dranoutre. There was little accommodation there for severe casualties, who were evacuated as soon as possible to the casualty clearing stations in Bailleul. Severe casualties went first and by noon on 30 April, 143 gas casualties had been admitted at Dranoutre, 176 more in the next 24 hours, eleven in the following 24 hours, twelve in the next 24 hours and ten more in the next four days. No. 1 Canadian Casualty Clearing Station at Bailleul admitted casualties from about 4:00 a.m. on 30 April and by 8:30 a.m. had taken 72 cases. No. 8 Casualty Clearing Station at Bailleul began to take casualties and by 12:30 a.m. on 1 May, was full with 321 gas casualties; later arrivals went on to No. 2 Casualty Clearing Station at Bailleul, which admitted 81 cases.

The troops worst affected had intense cyanosis and frothy exudation from the mouth and nose; some of the severe casualties who reached casualty clearing stations had a pallor and collapse associated with phosgene poisoning. In a few cases, cyanosis gave place to pallor before the victim died. The troops who died rapidly in the front line, about ninety minutes after the beginning of the attack, showed deep cyanosis and copious frothing, with paroxysmal coughing prominent in the early stages. The clinical evidence suggested that the gas cloud contained a low proportion of phosgene to chlorine. About twenty civilians were affected by the gas, though none severely, as they had been instructed in gas precautions and had been issued with respirators. The civilians had also protected themselves by closing windows and doors and by filling cracks with wet cloths; many also wore anti-gas helmets indoors.

== See also ==
- Phosgene attack 19 December 1915
- Gas attacks at Hulluch, 27–29 April 1916
