= German phosgene attack of 19 December 1915 =

Phosgene gas attack against British troops by the German army in WW1

German phosgene attack
- Part of Local operations December 1915 – June 1916 Western Front, in the First World War
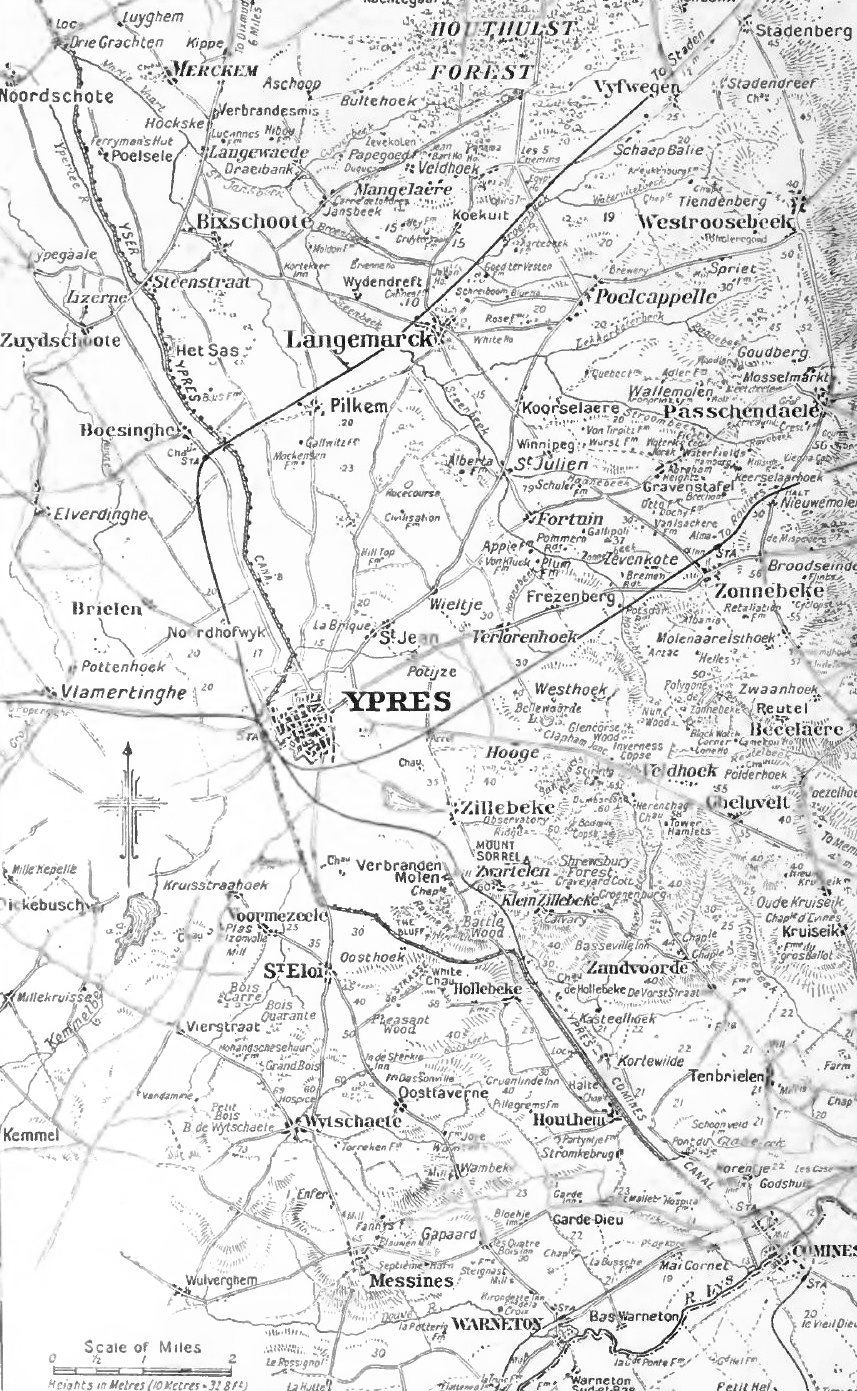
- Map of the Ypres district
Date	19 December 1915
Location	Wieltje, north-east of Ypres in West Flanders, Belgium 50°51′N 02°53′E
Result	British victory

Belligerents
Germany	British Empire

Commanders and leaders
(German Empire) Erich von Falkenhayn	(British Empire) Douglas Haig

Strength
Elements of 2 corps specialist Pioneer regiment	2 divisions

Casualties and losses
	Gas: 1,069
- Ypres in West Flanders, Belgium

The German phosgene attack of 19 December 1915 was the first use of phosgene gas against British troops by the German army. The gas attack took place at Wieltje, north-east of Ypres in Belgian Flanders on the Western Front in the First World War. German gas attacks on Allied troops had begun on 22 April 1915, during the Second Battle of Ypres using chlorine against French and Canadian units. The surprise led to the capture of much of the Ypres Salient, after which the effectiveness of gas as a weapon diminished, because the French and British introduced anti-gas measures and protective helmets. The German Nernst–Duisberg-Commission investigated the feasibility of adding the much more lethal phosgene to chlorine. Mixed chlorine and phosgene gas was used at the end of May 1915 against French troops and on Russian troops on the Eastern Front.

In December 1915, the 4th Army used the mixture of chlorine and phosgene against British troops in Flanders, during an attack at Wieltje near Ypres. Before the attack, the British had taken a prisoner who disclosed the plan and had also gleaned information from other sources; the divisions of VI Corps had been alerted from 15 December. The gas discharge on 19 December was accompanied by German raiding parties, most of which were engaged with small-arms fire, while they were attempting to cross no-man's land. British anti-gas precautions prevented a panic and a collapse of the defence, even though British anti-gas helmets had not been treated to repel phosgene. Only the 49th (West Riding) Division had a large number of gas casualties, when soldiers in reserve lines did not receive a warning in time to put on their helmets. A study by British medical authorities arrived at a figure of 1,069 gas casualties, 120 of which were fatal. After the operation, the Germans concluded that a breakthrough could not be achieved solely by the use of gas.

== Background ==
=== Chlorine gas attacks ===
During the evening of 22 April 1915, German pioneers released chlorine gas from cylinders placed in trenches at the Ypres Salient. The gas drifted into the positions of the French 87th Territorial and the 45th Algerian divisions, which occupied the north side of the salient and caused many of the troops to run back from the cloud. A gap had been made in the Allied line, which if exploited by the Germans, could have eliminated the salient and led to the capture of Ypres. The German attack was intended as a strategic diversion, rather than a breakthrough attempt and insufficient forces were available to follow up the success. As soon as German troops tried to advance into areas not affected by the gas, Allied small-arms and artillery fire dominated the area and halted the German advance.

The surprise gained against the French was increased by the lack of protection against gas and because of the psychological effect of its unpredictable nature. Bullets and shells followed a consistent path but gas varied in speed, intensity and extent. A soldier could evade bullets and shells by taking cover but gas followed him, seeped into trenches and dugouts and had a slow choking effect. A British soldier wrote,

I don't know how long this asphyxiating horror went on. While it lasted it was practically impossible to breathe. Men were going down all about and struggling for air as if they were drowning, at the bottom of our so-called trench.

— Lieutenant V. F. S. Hawkins

The gas was quickly identified as chlorine by an experimental laboratory established at General Headquarters on 27 April, by professors Watson, John Haldane and Baker. In the first week of May, Watson and Major Cluny McPherson, of the Newfoundland Medical Corps, sent an anti-gas helmet to the War Office for approval. The helmet was a flannel bag soaked in glycerine, hyposulphite and sodium bicarbonate; it was known as a British Smoke Helmet. By 6 July, all British troops in France had received one and in November an improved P Helmet was introduced.

=== Chlorine and phosgene ===
Based on research by Fritz Haber into chlorine as a weapon, the Nernst–Duisberg Commission investigated the feasibility of adding phosgene to chlorine gas, to increase its lethality. Work by Richard Willstätter to supply the German army with protective equipment, enabled it to contemplate the use of the far more lethal combination of phosgene and chlorine, without risk to German units. Phosgene was used by the German army from the end of May 1915, when attacks were conducted on the Western Front against French troops and on the Eastern Front on Russians, where 12,000 cylinders with 240–264 long tons (244–268 t) of 95 per cent chlorine and 5 per cent phosgene was discharged on a 7.5 mi (12 km) front at Bolimów. The gas failed to suppress some of the Russian artillery and the Germans thought that the attack had been ineffective, having already experienced the unpredictability of chemical weapons in cold weather; the Russians suffered 8,394 casualties of which 1,011 were fatal.

The first attack on British troops using the new gas combination was planned for 19 December, near Wieltje in Flanders. In late October 1915, Oberste Heeresleitung (OHL, German army high command) accepted a proposal from the 4th Army (Generaloberst Albrecht, Duke of Württemberg) for a gas attack east of Ypres and a specialist Gas Pioneer regiment was provided. The mixture of chlorine and phosgene was to be used against British troops for the first time. (Note: On a lethality index, chlorine was measured at 7,500 and phosgene at 450, in which the smaller number represents the deadlier gas.) The XXVII Reserve Corps commander, General der Artillerie Richard von Schubert, objected to the plan since, if successful, an attack would move the front line into even more marshy ground just before winter. Schubert preferred to attack near Wieltje, with Ypres as the ultimate objective; the resources for such an ambitious attack did not exist. By mid-November, Albrecht had decided to have the gas cylinders placed along the front of the XXVI Reserve Corps and on the right flank of the XXVII Reserve Corps.

== Prelude ==
=== German plan ===
Gas cylinders, containing a mixture of chlorine and phosgene, were placed along the front of the XXVI Reserve Corps and on the right flank of the XXVII Reserve Corps. In the XXVI Reserve Corps area, it was found to be impossible to place gas cylinders in a continuous line, due to the irregular nature of the trench lines. A conventional artillery bombardment would be fired but no general attack was to follow. The gas discharge, along the front, from Boesinghe to Pilckem and Verlorenhoek, was to be accompanied by patrols to observe the effect of the gas and to snatch prisoners and equipment.

=== British anti-gas procedures ===
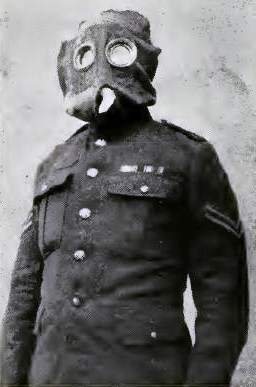
British soldier in a P or PH helmet in use on 19 December

Standing orders had been enforced after the chlorine gas attacks earlier in 1915. The state of the wind was monitored by an officer in each corps and during conditions favourable for a gas release, a Gas Alert was issued. A sentry was posted near every alarm horn or gong, at every dug-out big enough for ten men, each group of smaller dugouts and at all signal offices. Gas helmets and alarms were tested every twelve hours and all soldiers wore the helmet outside the greatcoat or rolled up on their heads, with the top greatcoat button undone to tuck the helmet in. Special lubricants were provided for the working parts of weapons in forward positions.

=== December 1915 ===
A German Non-commissioned officer of the XXVI Reserve Corps, which held the German line between the Ypres–Roulers and Ypres–Staden railway lines, was captured near Ypres on the night of 4/5 December. The prisoner said that gas cylinders had been dug into the corps front and that a gas attack had recently been postponed. Information had been gleaned from another source that a gas attack was to be made on the Flanders front after 10 December, when the weather was favourable. It had also been discovered that the 26th Reserve Division had arrived from the Eastern Front and was at Courtrai. The Allied front line opposite the XXVI Reserve Corps was held by the 6th Division (Major-General Charles Ross), the 49th (West Riding) Division (Major-General E. M. Perceval) of VI Corps (Lieutenant-General John Keir) and part of the right flank of the French 87th Territorial Division.

A special warning was issued along with the routine precautions and from 15 December, when the wind was relatively favourable for a gas discharge, the Gas Alert was issued. A bombardment of the German line opposite VI Corps was fired by 4.5-inch howitzers, to try to destroy gas cylinders in the area. The precautionary bombardment was limited by a chronic ammunition shortage, which had led to the twelve howitzers in each division being rationed to 250 shells for the week ending 20 December and 200 for the next week, about three shells per-howitzer-per-day. The bombardment caused damage to the parapets of the German trenches but did not affect the gas cylinders and the shoot had not finished when the gas attack began.

== Battle ==
=== 19 December ===
At 5:00 a.m., an unusual parachute flare was seen to rise from the German lines and at 5:15 a.m., red rockets, which were so unusual that British sentries gave the alert, rose all along the XXVI Reserve Corps front. Soon afterwards, a hissing was heard and a smell noticed. On the left flank, in the 49th (West Riding) Division area, which had the 146th Brigade and 147th Brigade in the line, no man's land was only 20 yd (18 m) wide in places and small-arms fire was received from the German trenches before the gas discharge. On the 6th Division front to the right, which had the 18th, 71st and 16th Brigades in line, the opposing trenches were about 300 yd (270 m) apart. Slow rifle fire began simultaneously with the discharge and increased after fifteen minutes. Sentries gave the gas warning by sounding the gongs and klaxons, the parapet was manned and rifle and machine-gun fire was opened by some battalions, as others waited on events. The divisional artilleries began a shrapnel barrage on their night bombardment lines. No German infantry attack followed, although troops were seen on German trench parapets and many troops were discovered to be occupying the German trenches, judged by the volume of rifle-fire directed at a British aircraft which flew low overhead.

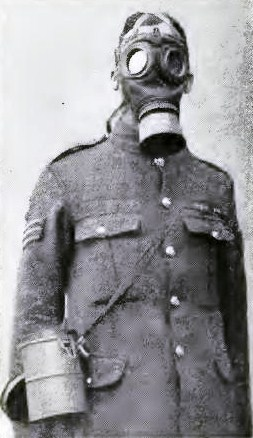
A British soldier models a German respirator.

Small numbers of German troops were seen to advance from the German line; in one place about twelve men moved forward in single file and at another place about 30 soldiers attacked. A party managed to reach the British parapet before being overwhelmed but the rest were shot down in no man's land. In the 71st Brigade sector, north-west of Wieltje, a German shrapnel bombardment was taken to mean that no infantry attack was imminent and the defenders went under cover. Lachrymatory and high explosive shells were fired at the right flank of the 49th (West Riding) Division and further back, on roads leading out of Ypres and on the British artillery lines but no systematic wire-cutting was observed. Vlamertinghe was bombarded by super-heavy 17-inch howitzers and Elverdinghe by 13-inch howitzers. The British defence scheme was implemented by moving forward the reserves of the 6th and 49th (West Riding) divisions and the 14th (Light) Division (Major-General Victor Couper) in corps reserve, was ordered to stand to.

The German gas discharge on the front from Boesinghe to Pilckem and Verlorenhoek was followed by twenty raiding parties, which were to observe the effect of the gas and to lift prisoners and equipment. According to German sources, only two patrols were able to reach the British line and several parties had many losses to British return-fire. The gas formed a white cloud about 50 ft (15 m) high and lasted for thirty minutes before a freshening north-easterly wind blew it away. The effect was felt over a large area, because the cloud spread outwards from the 3 mi (4.8 km) width of the attack front, to about 8 mi (13 km) further back. The gas cloud moved for about 10 mi (16 km), almost as far as Bailleul. Around 6:15 a.m., green rockets were fired from the German front line and the British lines were bombarded by gas shells, which moved quietly through the air and only exploded with a "dull splash". In the 49th (West Riding) Division area, some troops in support trenches were asleep and were gassed before they could be woken but most were able to don their helmets in time.

=== 20–21 December ===
At 8:00 a.m. on 20 December, a German observation balloon was sent up and an aeroplane flew low along the front line, followed at 9:00 a.m., by another six German aircraft, which flew as far as Vlamertinghe and Elverdinghe. After the gas shelling, the German artillery returned to high explosive fire until 9:30 a.m. and then the bombardment gradually diminished. At 2:15 a.m. the bombardment increased in intensity and continued periodically until the evening of 21 December.

== Aftermath ==
=== Analysis ===
British casualties (19 December 1915 – June 1916)
Month	Total
December	5,675
January	9,974
February	12,182
March	17,814
April	19,886
May	22,418
June	37,121
Total	125,141

The official historians of the Reichsarchiv wrote in Der Weltkrieg that at zero hour, some of the gas had not been released and gaps appeared in the cloud. Patrols found that the British had not retired from the front line, had engaged the Germans with small-arms fire and caused casualties. Despite favourable conditions, the gas had not had a great effect and it was concluded that a breakthrough could not be obtained just by a gas attack. Cloud gas attacks in April and May 1915, had been made against unprotected troops but by December, British troops had been trained, had efficient respirators and had organised anti-gas procedures. Cotton waste respirators had been replaced by a helmet made of flannelette, soaked in an absorbent solution. The P Helmet, soaked in sodium phenate (phenol) which absorbed chlorine and phosgene, was in use on 19 December. German gas attacks were made at night or in the early morning, when the wind was favourable and darkness made it difficult for the defenders to see the gas cloud. (Note: The PH Helmet, which was impregnated with hexamethylene tetramine along with sodium phenate, was in use soon after and by April 1916, the Large Box Respirator had been issued to machine-gunners, signallers and some artillerymen.)

Phosgene made the gas cloud more poisonous and the Germans tried to increase the concentration of the gas by discharging it quickly, though this reduced the duration of the attack. The gas was found to be a mixture of about 80 per cent chlorine and 20 per cent phosgene. The slow dispersal of cloud gas from depressions and trenches, made it difficult for the defenders to know when the gas discharge had ended. British studies concluded that the Germans had tried to surprise the troops with a lethal amount of gas, before they could get their helmets on. Soldiers wearing helmets were safe but one breath of concentrated gas would cause coughing and gasping, which made it very difficult to adjust the helmet and troops slow to don their helmets could be killed. On 19 December, some troops well behind the front line were affected and helmets were worn at Vlamertinghe, about 8,000 yd (4.5 mi; 7.3 km) behind the front line. The British concluded that the speed of the gas cloud reduced casualties, even though the gas helmets in use had not been treated specifically to resist phosgene.

=== Casualties ===
A British study counted 1,069 gas casualties, of which 120 were fatal; 75 per cent of the casualties being suffered by the 49th (West Riding) Division. Food exposed to the gas was tainted and soldiers who ate it vomited. Some of the gassed men suddenly died about twelve hours later while exerting themselves, despite showing few signs of illness beforehand.

=== Subsequent operations ===
The next substantial German gas attacks against the British took place from 27 to 29 April 1916, near the German-held village of Hulluch, a mile north of Loos-en-Gohelle. During the first attack on 27 April, the gas cloud and artillery bombardment were followed by raiding parties, which made temporary lodgements in the British lines. Two days later, a second gas attack was carried out at Hulluch. This time, the wind turned and blew the gas cloud back over the German lines, causing a large number of German casualties, which were increased by British troops firing at German soldiers as they fled in the open. The mixture of chlorine and phosgene was of sufficient concentration to penetrate the British PH helmet. The 16th (Irish) Division was unjustly blamed for poor gas discipline; to allay doubts as to the effectiveness of the helmet, it was put out that the gas helmets of the division were of inferior manufacture. Production of the Small Box Respirator, which had worked well during the attack, was accelerated.

== See also ==
- German gas attacks at Hulluch, 27 April and 29 April 1916
- German gas attacks at Wulverghem, 30 April and 17 June 1916
