= Gas attacks at Hulluch =

WWI military operation

- Part of the Western Front of the First World War
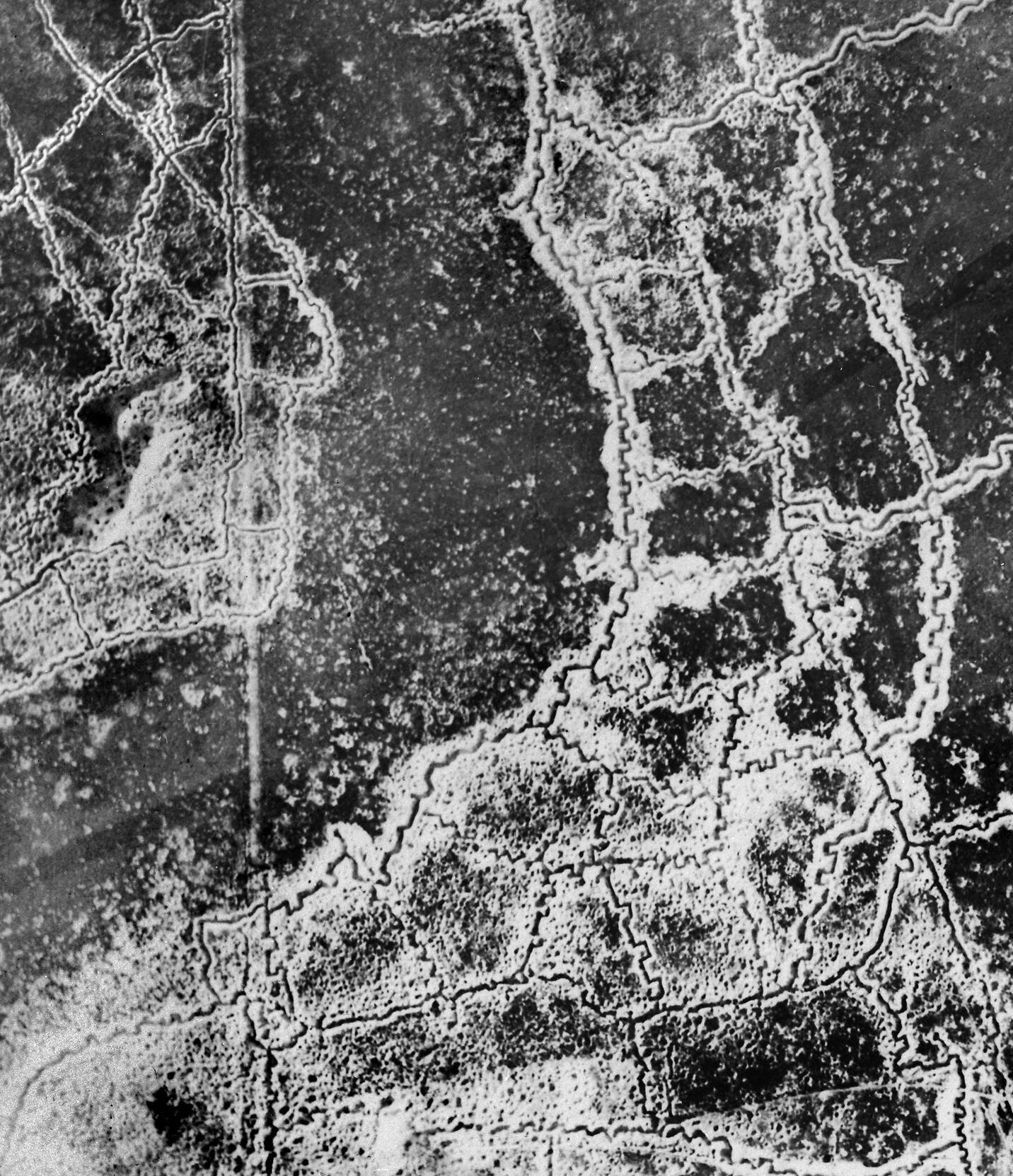
- Loos–Hulluch trenches (photographed in 1917)
Date	27–29 April 1916
Location	Hulluch, France 50°29′12″N 02°49′03″E
Result	British victory

Belligerents
United Kingdom	German Empire

Commanders and leaders
(United Kingdom of Great Britain and Ireland) Charles Kavanagh; (United Kingdom of Great Britain and Ireland) William Hickie	(German Empire) Otto von Stetten

Strength
I Corps; 12th (Eastern) Division; 15th (Scottish) Division; 16th (Irish) Division	II Royal Bavarian Corps; 3rd Bavarian Division; 4th Bavarian Division

Casualties and losses
1,980 (1,260 gas casualties, 338 killed)	c. 1,500 gas casualties (data incomplete)

The gas attacks at Hulluch were two German cloud gas attacks on British troops during the First World War, from 27 to 29 April 1916, near the village of Hulluch, 1 mi (1.6 km) north of Loos in northern France. The gas attacks were part of an engagement between divisions of the II Royal Bavarian Corps and divisions of the British I Corps.

Just before dawn on 27 April, the 16th (Irish) Division and part of the 15th (Scottish) Division were subjected to a cloud gas attack near Hulluch. The gas cloud and artillery bombardment were followed by raiding parties, which made temporary lodgements in the British lines. Two days later the Germans began another gas attack but the wind turned and blew the gas back over the German lines. A large number of German casualties were caused by the change in the wind direction and the decision to go ahead despite protests by local officers. German casualties were increased by the British, who fired on German soldiers as they fled in the open.

The gas used by the German troops at Hulluch was a mixture of chlorine and phosgene, which had first been used on 19 December 1915 at Wieltje, near Ypres. The German gas was of sufficient concentration to penetrate the British PH gas helmets and the 16th (Irish) Division was unjustly blamed for poor gas discipline. It was put out that the gas helmets of the division were of inferior manufacture, to allay doubts as to the effectiveness of the helmet. Production of the Small Box Respirator, which had worked well during the attack, was accelerated.

== Background ==
=== 1915 ===
By the end of the Battle of Loos in 1915, the British armies in France held ground which was usually inferior to the German positions opposite, which were on higher ground, which was drier and had good observation over the British lines and rear areas. In early 1916 the British took over more of the Western Front, to allow the French Tenth Army to move south to Verdun, ground which was just as tactically disadvantageous. Only around Armentières were the German defences on lower ground. The possibility of a withdrawal to more easily defensible ground was rejected by Joffre, the French Generalissimo and all the Allied commanders preferred to improve their positions by advancing. With this in mind, the French and British made far less effort to improve their defences, which conceded another advantage to the Germans, who could attack positions protected by far less extensive barbed wire barriers and few deep-mined dugouts than their own. Allowing such positions to relapse into quiet fronts was rejected by the British, who instituted sniping, unpredictable artillery bombardments and raids, which provoked German retaliation; the British conducted three attacks against five by the Germans and numerous raids.

=== 1916 ===
In early 1916, the Germans had more and better equipment for trench warfare, with good quality hand grenades, rifle grenades and trench mortars; the Germans made more effort to repair and improve defences and with a homogeneous army, found it easier to move artillery, ammunition and men along the front. A substantial cadre of the pre-war trained officers and conscripts remained, to lead the wartime recruits. British tunnellers achieved an ascendancy over their German equivalents but in ground operations, the number of operational machine-guns and the volume and accuracy of artillery-fire had more effect than individual skill and bravery; the quantity of heavy guns often determined the course of engagements. The success of a local attack left the victors vulnerable to a counter-attack and captured positions were often more costly to hold than the previous positions.

== Prelude ==
=== German preparations and plan ===
The German began preparing for the attack during April, placing about 7,400 gas cylinders along a 3 km (1.9 mi) front from Cité St Elie to Loos, where no man's land had been only 120–300 yd (110–270 m) apart since the Battle of Loos (25 September – 14 October 1915). German artillery began a systematic bombardment of British observation posts, supply points and communication trenches, supplemented by trench mortar and rifle grenade fire. Shelling diminished from 24 to 25 April and on 26 April, the positions of the 16th (Irish) Division were bombarded and the 12th (Eastern) Division front was raided. The next day was fine and warm, with a wind blowing towards the British lines. The 4th Bavarian Division was to follow up a gas attack on 27 April with patrols against the British positions. Two days later, despite less favourable winds, a second gas discharge was ordered against the wishes of the local commanders, who were over-ruled.

=== British preparations ===
A German soldier deserted on the night of 23/24 April and warned the British that an attack on the Hulluch front, probably with gas, was imminent, which confirmed indications already noticed by the British. Rats had been seen moving away from the German trenches and was inferred to be due to leaky gas cylinders. The systematic bombardment of British defensive positions and the testimony of the deserter led Lieutenant-General Charles Kavanagh, the commander of I Corps, to issue a warning to the 1st Division which held the line from Lens to Loos, the 16th (Irish) Division in the centre from Puits 14 bis to Hulluch and the 12th (Eastern) Division to the north, opposite The Quarries and the Hohenzollern Redoubt. The 15th (Scottish) Division relief of the 12th (Eastern) Division from 24 to 30 April was allowed to proceed. Four reserve artillery batteries were moved into the 15th (Scottish) Division area and all units were required to rehearse gas alerts daily. The British were equipped with PH helmets, which protected against phosgene up to a concentration of 1,000 p.p.m.

== Attack ==
=== 27 April ===
The German attack near Hulluch began with the release of smoke, followed by a mixture of chlorine and phosgene gas 1½ hours later, from 3,800 cylinders, on the fronts of Bavarian Infantry Regiment 5 (BIR 5) and Bavarian Reserve Infantry Regiment 5 (BRIR 5). The discharge on the front of Bavarian Infantry Regiment 9 (BIR 9) was cancelled, as the direction of the wind risked enveloping the 3rd Bavarian Division on the right flank, in the Hohenzollern Redoubt sector. At 5:00 a.m., German artillery began a high-explosive, shrapnel and trench-mortar bombardment, on the front of the 16th (Irish) Division and the right flank of the 15th (Scottish) Division to the north, laid a barrage on communication trenches and fired lachrymatory shells into villages and British rear positions. At 5:10 a.m., gas and smoke clouds rose from the German trenches and moved towards the British trenches, blown by a south-easterly wind. The gas cloud was so thick at the beginning, that visibility was reduced to 2–3 yd (1.8–2.7 m); wearing gas helmets was necessary 3.5 mi (5.6 km) behind the front line and the smell was noticed 15 mi (24 km) away.

Three German mines were exploded at 5:55 a.m., another artillery bombardment was fired and a second gas cloud was discharged. Several raiding parties of about 20 men each, followed the gas and three managed to get into the British trenches. One party entered the British front line at Chalk Pit Wood for about fifteen minutes; the second was quickly expelled from the lines north of Posen Alley and caught by Lewis-gun fire in no man's land. The third party got into the trenches on the right flank of the 15th (Scottish) Division, just north of the Vermelles–Hulluch road and was promptly bombed out; by 7:30 a.m. the raiding parties had withdrawn. (Note: A German account in the history of BIR 9 9, recorded parties raiding from 6:45 to 8:00 a.m. and that three patrols entered the British positions, where they inflicted losses in the defenders.)

At 5:10 a.m. on 27 April, a gas alert was raised in the 16th (Irish) Division area and the divisional and corps artillery began a bombardment on the rear of the German lines, from whence the gas was being discharged. After thirty minutes, groups of German infantry about 20–30 strong, equipped with pistols and hand grenades, were seen heading for gaps in the British wire and were repulsed by rifle and machine-gun fire. At about 6:00 a.m., the three mines were sprung and another bombardment was fired, before sending another gas cloud, which caused many casualties to a Black Watch company, whose commander had ordered them to remove their gas helmets after the first gas cloud, under the impression that the helmets were useless after one exposure to gas. (Note: An account describes a subterfuge, in which the gas was disguised by a smoke-screen, causing British troops to dispense with their Phenate-Hexamine Goggle helmets and caused 549 casualties, of whom 139 men were killed.) Behind the second gas cloud, larger parties of German infantry advanced and managed to get into the British trenches for brief periods at three points. At Chalk Pit Wood the British had a howitzer, which had been brought up in September 1915, to fire in support of an attack on Hulluch. Since the Lone How was only 40 yd (37 m) behind the British front line, orders had been given to destroy it, in the event of a German raid and a demolition charge had been left on the gun with a lit fuze.

=== 29 April ===
On 29 April, the German infantry sent up a green then a red flare and at 3:45 a.m., German artillery began to bombard the reserve and communication trenches of the 16th (Irish) Division. A gas cloud was released, followed by white smoke from Chalk Pit Wood to Hulluch, after BIR 9 had been ordered to discharge the gas by higher authority, despite unfavourable winds. German raiding parties advanced, as the gas moved very slowly and then veered about, as it reached the British third line; the German raiders were then engaged by British infantry with small-arms fire. The gas suddenly blew back towards the German lines and in the area of BIR 9 and BIR 5 the troops of Pioneer Regiment 36 (PR 36) were not able to stop the discharge straight away. Many German troops were caught without gas masks on and had about 1,500 gas casualties. On the right flank, the 3rd Bavarian Division recorded 34 more casualties. The German bombardment abruptly ended, as the gas dispersed southwards.

The 48th Brigade recaptured the wood and a few hours later the Lone How was discovered intact, the fuze having gone out. The howitzer was so well camouflaged, that the German raiders had not noticed it. (Note: The Lone How remained in the wood, causing much damage to the Germans until late 1916 and was then withdrawn, eventually being placed in the Imperial War Museum.) British artillery-fire was believed to have destroyed some German gas cylinders, when German troops were seen to climb out of their front trenches and run to the rear, amid British small-arms fire. Eighty dead German soldiers were counted later, in and around the British front trenches. By 7:30 a.m., the German raid was over and during the night, two British battalions were relieved; the rest of 28 April was quiet, except for a raid by the 1st Division, at the Double Crassier near Loos. At 3:45 a.m., a German artillery bombardment and gas discharge began on the 16th (Irish) Division front but the expected attack did not occur. German troops were seen massing in the trenches near Hulluch at 4:10 a.m. and small numbers advanced towards the British trenches, where they were engaged by small-arms fire. The German gas then reversed course and German infantry on a 0.5 mi (0.80 km) front ran to the rear through the gas and British artillery-fire, leaving about 120 dead on the front of the 16th (Irish) Division.

== Aftermath ==
=== Analysis ===
British casualties (19 December 1915 – June 1916)
Month	Total
December	5,675
January	9,974
February	12,182
March	17,814
April	19,886
May	22,418
June	37,121
Total	125,141

The 16th (Irish) Division had a considerable number of gas casualties during the German attacks; the greatest number of deaths occurred, at the points on the British front where the gas was most concentrated. Anti-gas blankets fitted on dugout entrances were found to be ineffective but Lewis-guns wrapped in blankets and sprayed with Vermorel during the passage of the gas cloud, were only slightly affected. Some ammunition was made unusable and some rifles jammed, due to chemical deposits forming on the bolts. The troops most affected by the gas could not be relieved immediately but were exempted from carrying duties for the next day and no ill effects were reported. British troops were said to have been greatly encouraged by the German fiasco but uneasy about the protection offered by their PH gas helmets. The troops were deceived, by being told that the helmets issued to the 16th (Irish) Division, had not been properly impregnated with chemical neutralisers and that 16th (Irish) Division gas discipline had been unsatisfactory. New "box respirators", worn by Lewis gunners, were found to have worked well and production was expedited.

=== Casualties ===
On 27 April the 16th (Irish) Division had lost 442 men and the 15th (Scottish) Division reported 107 losses. Total British casualties from 27 to 29 April were 1,980, of whom 1,260 were gas casualties, 338 being killed. (Note: The 7th Royal Irish Fusiliers: 80 gas casualties, 7th Royal Inniskilling Fusiliers: 263 gas casualties, 8th Royal Inniskilling Fusiliers: 366 gas casualties (73 per cent) 8th Royal Dublin Fusiliers: 385 gas casualties and wounded, (c. 50 per cent) about two-thirds of the casualties being due to gas. More than 900 of the 1,260 gas casualties were incurred by these battalions.) German casualties in BIR 5, BRIR 5, PR 36 who operated the gas cylinders and other non-infantry troops were not known in 1932, when the British Official History was published. BIR 9 had 419 casualties, 286 from gas, of whom 163 died and there were 34 more gas casualties in the 3rd Bavarian Division, of whom four men died. A contemporary French intelligence summary recorded 1,100 casualties in the 4th Bavarian Division from 27 to 29 April and in October 1918, an officer of the British 15th (Scottish) Division found the graves of 400 German gas casualties at the cemetery at Pont-à-Vendin, from the gas discharges. In 1934, Foulkes wrote that a diary taken from a captured soldier of the 4th Bavarian Division, recorded 1,600 gas casualties in the division and in 2002, Hook and Jones recorded 1,500 casualties from the German gas which blew back on 29 April. (Note: Hook and Jones also wrote that the Pioneers wore an improved Rahmenmaske but had little time to put them on and that many of the masks of the Bavarian infantry were in poor condition; the writers offered no sources.)

== See also ==
- Phosgene attack 19 December 1915
- Gas attacks at Wulverghem
