= Loss of the Kink Salient =

Action of WWI

- Part of Local operations December 1915 – June 1916 Western Front, First World War
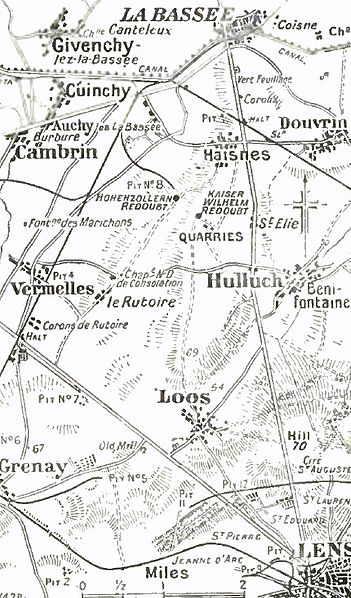
- Lens–La Bassée area
Date	11–14 May 1916
Location	Loos-en-Gohelle, Nord-Pas-de-Calais, France 50°27′30″N 02°47′39″E
Result	German victory

Belligerents
Germany	British Empire

Commanders and leaders
(German Empire) Erich von Falkenhayn	(United Kingdom of Great Britain and Ireland) Douglas Haig

Strength
2 battalions	2 battalions

Casualties and losses
71 (incomplete)	935; 135 taken prisoner
- Loos is a commune in the Pas-de-Calais department in the Nord-Pas-de-Calais region of France

The Loss of the Kink Salient occurred during a local attack on 11 May 1916, by the 3rd Bavarian Division on the positions of the 15th (Scottish) Division. The attack took place at the west end of the Hohenzollern Redoubt near Loos, on the Western Front during the First World War. An unprecedented bombardment demolished the British front line, then specially trained German assault units rushed the survivors and captured the British front line and the second line of defence; British tunnellers were trapped in their galleries and taken prisoner.

Hasty counter-attacks by the British were repulsed amidst the darkness, smoke and dust, that left British artillery observers unable to see the front line. The British guns continued to fire on the German front line long after the German raiders had crossed no man's land but an organised counter-attack at 9:30 p.m. was conducted with artillery support. The counter-attack made progress at Hussar Horn in the early hours of 12 May but was abandoned. A final attempt to recapture the lost ground on 14 May was defeated and the British consolidated a new line further back, on ground less exposed than the Kink.

== Background ==
=== 1915 ===
The Battle of Loos took place in support of the French autumn offensive by the Tenth Army, which fought the Third Battle of Artois (25 September – 4 November) and the Second and Fourth armies in the Second Battle of Champagne (25 September – 6 November). The British attack began on 25 September, when the infantry advanced behind a cloud gas discharge, intended to make up for a lack of artillery and ammunition. The Hohenzollern Redoubt and Fosse 8 were captured by the 9th (Scottish) Division. On the night of 25/26 September, German counter-attacks retook ground but were repulsed at Fosse 8 until another attack on 27 September, when the Fosse was recaptured.

British attacks to regain Fosse 8 began on 28 September but the Hohenzollern Redoubt was also lost on 3 October. The British front was reorganised for another attempt, which due to delays and bad weather, was forestalled by a German surprise attack on 8 October, from Loos to La Bassée Canal. The delayed British attack went ahead on 13 October, in the action of the Hohenzollern Redoubt, during which the 46th (North Midland) Division overran the redoubt. The British were forced to retire after dark, because their salient was untenable. The British retreated to The Chord, a trench behind the east face of the redoubt and the west face was fortified as a reserve line. The attack had been a costly failure, in which the 46th (North Midland) Division suffered 3,583 casualties, most in the first ten minutes of the attack.

=== 1916 ===
After the Battle of the Hohenzollern Redoubt in 1915, the British had retained the west end of the redoubt, with The Chord as the new front line. Artillery bombardments and tunnelling were conducted by the Germans during the winter of 1915–1916; due to the nature of the clay covering and chalk below ground, mine explosions threw up high lips around mine craters, which made good observation points. Observation increased the accuracy of German bombardments and The Chord was re-captured, leaving the British on lower ground in the west side of the redoubt. The British 170th Tunnelling Company, dug deep galleries over four months during the winter and in late February, three mines were placed underneath the shallower galleries dug by the Germans. An attack was prepared by the 12th (Eastern) Division for 2 March, to recapture The Chord. The mines were sprung at 5:45 p.m. and formed craters 30 ft (9.1 m) west of The Chord, giving observation over the objective.

The new craters, A, B and C, older craters 1 to 5 and Triangle Crater were occupied and the 170th Tunnelling Company destroyed German mine entrances found in the Triangle Crater. German counter-attacks retook Triangle Crater on 4 March and from 7 to 14 March, skirmishing took place during heavy snowstorms and bitter cold. German attacks diminished until 18 March, when five mines were blown, the captured portions of The Chord were re-taken and the British were driven back to the old front line. The Germans found the area equally untenable and retired to the eastern side of the crater lips. The British had found the craters to be poor protection against bombardment and the morass of liquefied chalk and mud at the crater bottoms was not suitable material for protection. Revetments dug into the crater lips was soon blown up by German shells or slipped down the crater sides.

=== The Kink ===
After the fighting in March 1916, the British front line near Fosse 8 had become a blunt salient known as the Kink, between the Hohenzollern Redoubt and the Cité St. Elie quarries. The salient was about 400 yd (370 m) wide and lay on a slight slope down to Fosse 8 and had two outcrops, the Kink on the right and Hussar Horn on the left. The area was overlooked from the Hohenzollern Redoubt, by Fosse 8 and from several mine craters in no man's land. The area was regularly bombarded with great accuracy by German artillery and trench mortars. German mining had left no man's land, which was only 100 yd (91 m) wide, a crater field occupied by both sides. Many British troops considered that the area was the worst place on the Western Front. The 170th Tunnelling Company RE had eventually managed to gain dominance over the German miners and by the end of April all of the craters except for one just north of the Kink had been re-captured. As a precaution, the old front line was maintained and further back, Hussar Horn and Anchor trenches crossed, making switch lines. A reserve line ran along Hulluch Alley and Sackville Street 250 yd (230 m) further back and the Village Line lay another 1.25 mi (2.01 km) beyond.

== Prelude ==
=== German preparations and plan ===
Bavarian Infantry Regiment 18 of the 3rd Bavarian Division, took over the area from the quarries to the Hohenzollern Redoubt on 1 April and found that the ground opposite the Kink was a narrow crater field, with no view of the British lines. The British held all but one crater, could creep up on the German lines and begin new mine galleries from the craters. The German defences were cramped for room, being less than 0.25 mi (0.40 km) forward of Fosse 8, a German observation point. As the situation in the area deteriorated, the 3rd Bavarian Division planned to eliminate the threat by a surprise attack. II Battalion, Infantry Regiment 18 and I Battalion, Infantry Regiment 23 were selected for the operation, to be commanded by Generalmajor (Major-General) Eugen von Clauß, the commander of the 6th Bavarian Infantry Brigade (6. bayerische Infanterie-Brigade).

For several weeks, the battalions practised for the attack; 22 old dugouts were enlarged and 29 more were dug to accommodate the attackers during the final bombardment. Quick entry and exit from the dugouts was rehearsed and each soldier was shown the gap in the German barbed wire which he was to pass through. The attack was to begin at 6:00 p.m., led by bombing parties and bayonet men identified by black armlets, carrying wire cutters, spades and ladders. The second wave wearing white armbands were to carry entrenching tools and a third wave in red armlets, were to follow with knife rests, dugout frames, steel plates and planks. Each Non-commissioned officer was to wear a white board with the company number in black to keep units together. After several weather delays, the battalions were brought forward by train to Meurchin 3.5 mi (5.6 km) east of Hulluch then filtered forward in small groups to the dugouts. Ten minutes before zero hour, the troops moved into the front line.

=== British defensive preparations ===
The 15th (Scottish) Division took over the line around the Kink on 27 April, a day when German artillery and trench mortar fire increased. On 1 May, the Germans blew a small mine at Hussar Horn and a second mine on 5 May, which did no damage and was taken by the British to be for improvements to the German defences. German machine-gun fire had increased at night, when the British were trying to consolidate the craters in no man's land, which led to the British firing a bombardment on the German trenches on 6 May. After the British retaliatory bombardment, the Germans returned to the normal amount of artillery-fire. By 11 May, the 15th (Scottish) Division front was held by the 46th Brigade on the right with the 8th King's Own Scottish Borderers (8th KOSB) and the 10th Scottish Rifles. On the left, the 45th Brigade held a sector with the 13th Royal Scots and the 11th Argyll and Sutherland Highlanders. The remaining four battalions of the brigades were in reserve and the 44th Brigade was accommodated in billets 5–6 mi (8.0–9.7 km) behind the front line.

== Battle ==
=== 11 May ===
At 4:00 p.m. German artillery began to fire on the front of the 15th (Scottish) Division (Major-General Frederick McCracken) and at 4:25 p.m., the shelling fell on the Kink, from Border Redoubt to Clifford Street, in the area of the 13th Royal Scots of the 45th Brigade. The British artillery returned fire soon after but dust and smoke obscured the front and made observation impossible. McCracken ordered the reserve brigade to readiness, moved a battalion to Noyelles and manned machine-guns in the Village Line. At 5:00 p.m., the Germans sprung a mine near Hohenzollern Redoubt and then the German artillery-fire on the Kink diminished and increased at the redoubt. British artillery also switched targets and a German infantry attack was repulsed by the artillery and the small-arms fire of the 11th Argyll and Sutherland Highlanders (11th Argylls).

German artillery-fire increased at the Kink again at 5:45 p.m. and became one of the greatest concentrations of shellfire on a small area of the war. Villages and artillery positions behind the front line were bombarded with high explosive and gas shells. The 13th Royal Scots in the first line had been killed, casualties had reduced the rest of the battalion by half and the ground had become a field of shell-holes. Battalion headquarters had been hit by a shell at 4:00 p.m., which wounded or killed everyone inside and created a command vacuum. At 6:00 p.m., German infantry moved forward, screened by the craters in no man's land and overwhelmed the survivors in the front line, after a short exchange of fire. The attackers then occupied Anchor Trench just behind, as the surviving 30–40 Scots in the trench retreated to Sackville Street.

The German attackers overshot because the British trenches were unrecognisable and almost reached the British third line in the gloom. The troops were rallied and returned to the objective at the British second line. Entrances of the British mine galleries were captured and 39 tunnellers were taken prisoner. The 12th Royal Scots reserve company bombed forward from Sackville Street but were repulsed. British artillery fire continued on the crater field and the German front line, since telephone cables were buried only 6–12 in (15–30 cm) deep and had been cut as soon as the German artillery opened fire; observation was still impossible in the smoke and dust. During the night, the British artillery continued to fire at the wrong target and the German infantry were able to consolidate the captured ground undisturbed. At 6:30 p.m., the commander of the 6th/7th Royal Scots Fusiliers (6th/7th RSF) the 45th Brigade reserve battalion, took over in the sector.

Organised counter-attacks by bombing parties from the 6th/7th RSF began and other groups from the 46th Brigade area to the right joined in. The attacks failed against German machine-gun fire and Brigadier-General Allgood, commander of the 45th Brigade, ended the attempts to bomb along trenches. Allgood prepared a counter-attack with artillery support, to take place at 9:30 p.m. over open ground. Most of the attackers were mown down by machine-gun fire but some reached the west end of Hussar Horn. At 3:00 a.m. on 12 May, the attempts were abandoned and a new front line was established in Sackville Street, which was consolidated with help from the 73rd Field company RE and the divisional pioneer battalion.

=== 12–14 May ===
From 12–14 May, a huge volume of German artillery-fire continued to fall in the area of the Kink, which destroyed many trenches and buried men. On 14 May, another counter-attack was made at 6:40 p.m.,by the 7th/8th KOSB from Boyau 98 on the right flank, to capture Boyau 99 east of Anchor Trench. (Note: Boyau was the French term for a communication trench.) The attack on Boyau 99 was to be carried out by C Company, supported by A Company at 6:45 p.m. After a bombardment beginning at 5:15 p.m., on the German line opposite the objective and along German trenches on either side. The British bombardment was feeble and within ten minutes, German artillery replied with a counter-barrage. The Scots retired from their trenches for about 100 yd (91 m) to avoid short-shelling and at 6:00 p.m., the trenches were reoccupied, as the heavy artillery lifted to targets further back and the field artillery continued on the German front line. C Company was to move along Stansfield Road to the support trench, where the leading to platoons were to close up to Boyau 98. The left two platoons were to move into the support trench and at 6:15 p.m., both parties were to assemble along Boyau 98, ready to attack at 6:45 p.m., when the field artillery bombardment lifted to trenches behind Boyau 99.

A Company was to follow C Company and turn off by half-companies, into the support trench and the fire trench respectively. When A Company got into the fire trench, direction was lost and the right half of the support company turned up a blind sap, due to the bombardments of both sides altering the landscape, some trenches having been obliterated. At 6:45 p.m., C Company attacked from Boyau 98, followed by the left flank platoons of A Company, then the right flank platoons across no man's land, which was about 200 yd (180 m) wide on the right and 150 yd (140 m) wide on the left. The leading company had spent ninety minutes under German artillery and trench mortar bombardment and moved as fast as possible to clear the area. When the Scots attacked from Boyau 98, it was found that the Germans had moved up and occupied the far side of the Scottish barricade and engaged the attackers immediately. C Company reached Boyau 99 but forced out by German artillery and trench mortar fire. At 8:30 p.m. another attack was ordered by B Company, two platoons of which had occupied part of Hulluch Alley close to Boyau 98, under fire from heavy artillery all day.

The attack was ordered for 10:30 p.m., when the Scottish field artillery was to begin a barrage on Boyau 99. A Company, which had also been bombarded all day, was withdrawn from the front line to the assembly point in darkness and over ground, because the ground to the front rose towards the German front line in Crown Trench. It took until midnight before B Company was ready; the attack was cancelled and the troops were ordered to consolidate the position before dawn. McCracken ended attempts to recapture the lost ground, even though the German had improved their positions in front of Fosse 8, since the new front line along Sackville Street and the support line behind, were better than the exposed lines at the Kink, a decision which was approved by the First Army commander, General Charles Monro.

== Aftermath ==
=== Analysis ===
British casualties (19 December 1915 – June 1916)
Month	Total
December	5,675
January	9,974
February	12,182
March	17,814
April	19,886
May	22,418
June	37,121
Total	125,141

The Germans captured an area of 600 by 400 yd (550 by 370 m) and the historians of Bavarian Infantry Regiment 18 wrote that the attack went according to plan. Misdirected British artillery-fire, which remained on the German front line all night, left the attackers to consolidate their gains undisturbed. British infantry were said to have recovered quickly from the surprise and counter-attacked using hand grenades all night. The counter-attack on 14 May, was described by the British official historian, James Edmonds, as breaking down under German machine-gun fire.

=== Casualties ===
The 15th (Scottish) Division had 935 casualties from 11 to15 May of which the Germans claimed to have taken 135 prisoners. The 13th Royal Scots lost 242 men, 152 of whom were listed as missing and believed to have been buried by German artillery-fire. The 170th Tunnelling Company RE lost 61 men. (In 1926, Stewart and Buchan, the 15th (Scottish) Division historians, recorded 493 casualties, plus the 61 men of the tunnelling company.) The II Battalion, Infantry Regiment 18 suffered 71 casualties, most lost on 12 May. Casualties in I Battalion, Infantry Regiment 23 are not known.
