= Pont-à-Vendin =

- Commune
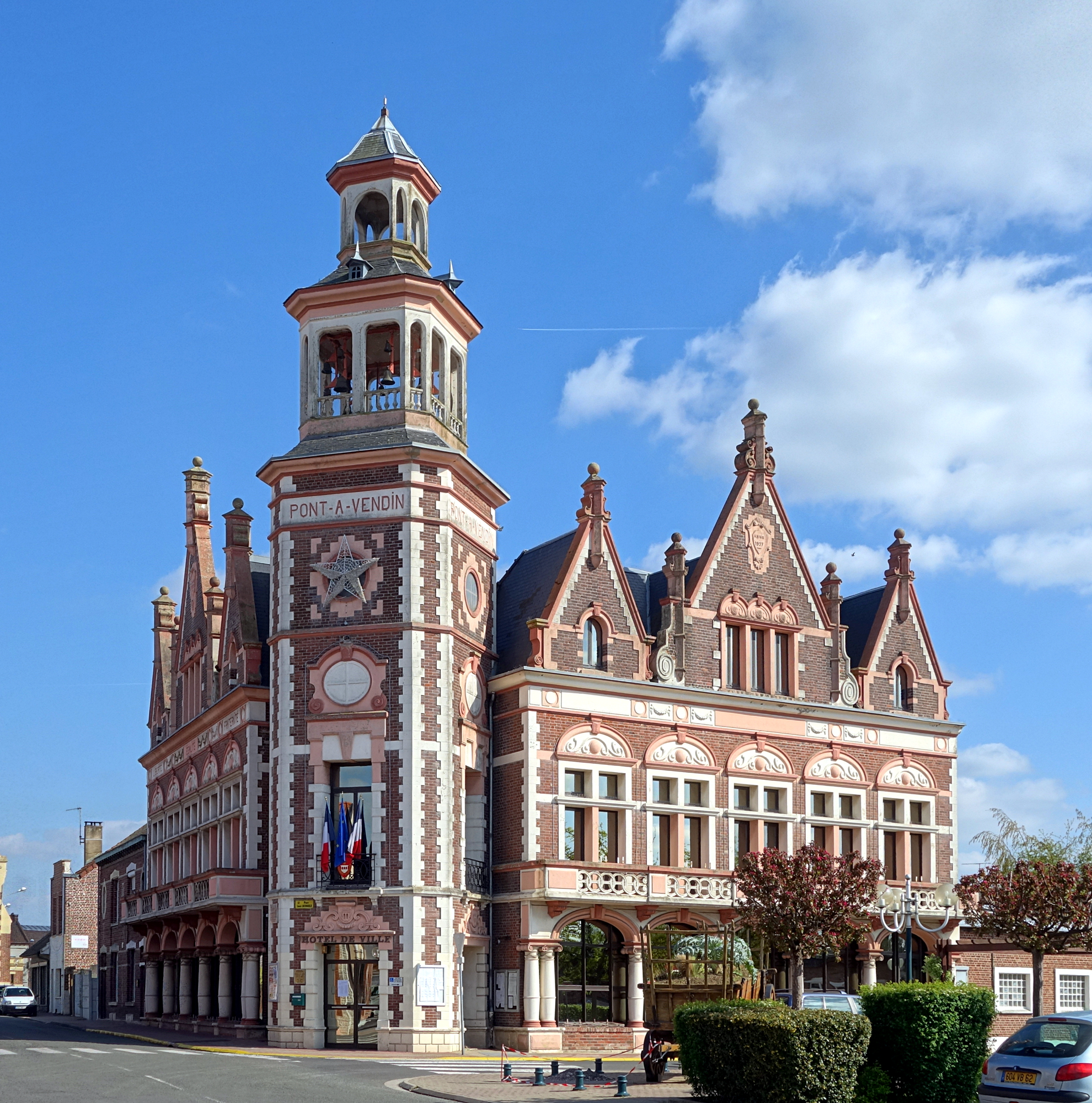
- The town hall of Pont-à-Vendin

- Coat of arms
- Location of Pont-à-Vendin
- Location within France Location within Hauts-de-France
- Coordinates: 50°28′28″N 2°53′22″E
- Country: France
- Region: Hauts-de-France
- Department: Pas-de-Calais
- Arrondissement: Lens
- Canton: Wingles
- Intercommunality: CA Lens-Liévin

Government
  - Mayor (2022–2026): Sandra Bablin
- Area^{1}: 2.01 km^{2} (0.78 sq mi)
- Elevation: 26 m (85 ft)
- Highest elevation: 41 m (135 ft)
- Lowest elevation: 21 m (69 ft)
- Population (2023): 3,062
  - Density: 1,520/km^{2} (3,950/sq mi)
- Time zone: UTC+01:00 (CET)
  - Summer (DST): UTC+02:00 (CEST)
- INSEE/Postal code: 62666 /62880
- ^{1} French Land Register data, which excludes lakes, ponds, glaciers > 1 km^{2} (0.386 sq mi or 247 acres) and river estuaries.

Pont-à-Vendin (French pronunciation: [pɔ̃.t‿a vɑ̃dɛ̃]) is a commune in the Pas-de-Calais department in the Hauts-de-France region of France.

== Geography ==
Pont-à-Vendin is a farming and light industrial town, 5 miles (8.0 km) northeast of Lens, at the junction of the D30 and the D164 roads. The commune was important during the Middle Ages, as the Deûle river is bridged here.

== Population ==
Historical population
Year	Pop.	±% p.a.
1968	3,489	—
1975	3,368	−0.50%
1982	2,882	−2.20%
1990	2,803	−0.35%
1999	2,899	+0.37%
2007	3,132	+0.97%
2012	3,135	+0.02%
2017	3,187	+0.33%
2023	3,062	−0.66%
Source: INSEE

== Places of interest ==
- The eighteenth century church of St. Vaast, rebuilt along with most of the town, after the First World War.
- The German war cemetery.
- The war memorial.

== International relations ==
Pont-à-Vendin is twinned with:

- Faetano, San Marino (2014)

== See also ==
- Communes of the Pas-de-Calais department
