= Canton of Wingles =

Coordinates: 50°29′13″N 2°51′11″E

Wingles
- Canton
- Location of Wingles within the department
- Country: France
- Region: Hauts-de-France
- Department: Pas-de-Calais
- No. of communes: {{{nbcomm}}}
- Area: 51.69 km^{2} (19.96 sq mi)
- Population (2023): 43,132
  - Density: 834.4/km^{2} (2,161/sq mi)
- INSEE code: 6239

The Canton of Wingles is a canton of France, located in the Pas-de-Calais department, in the Hauts-de-France region.

== Communes ==
At the French canton reorganisation which came into effect in March 2015, the canton was expanded from 5 to 9 communes:

- Bénifontaine
- Estevelles
- Grenay
- Hulluch
- Loos-en-Gohelle
- Meurchin
- Pont-à-Vendin
- Vendin-le-Vieil
- Wingles

== See also ==
- Cantons of the Pas-de-Calais department
