= Bénifontaine =

- Commune
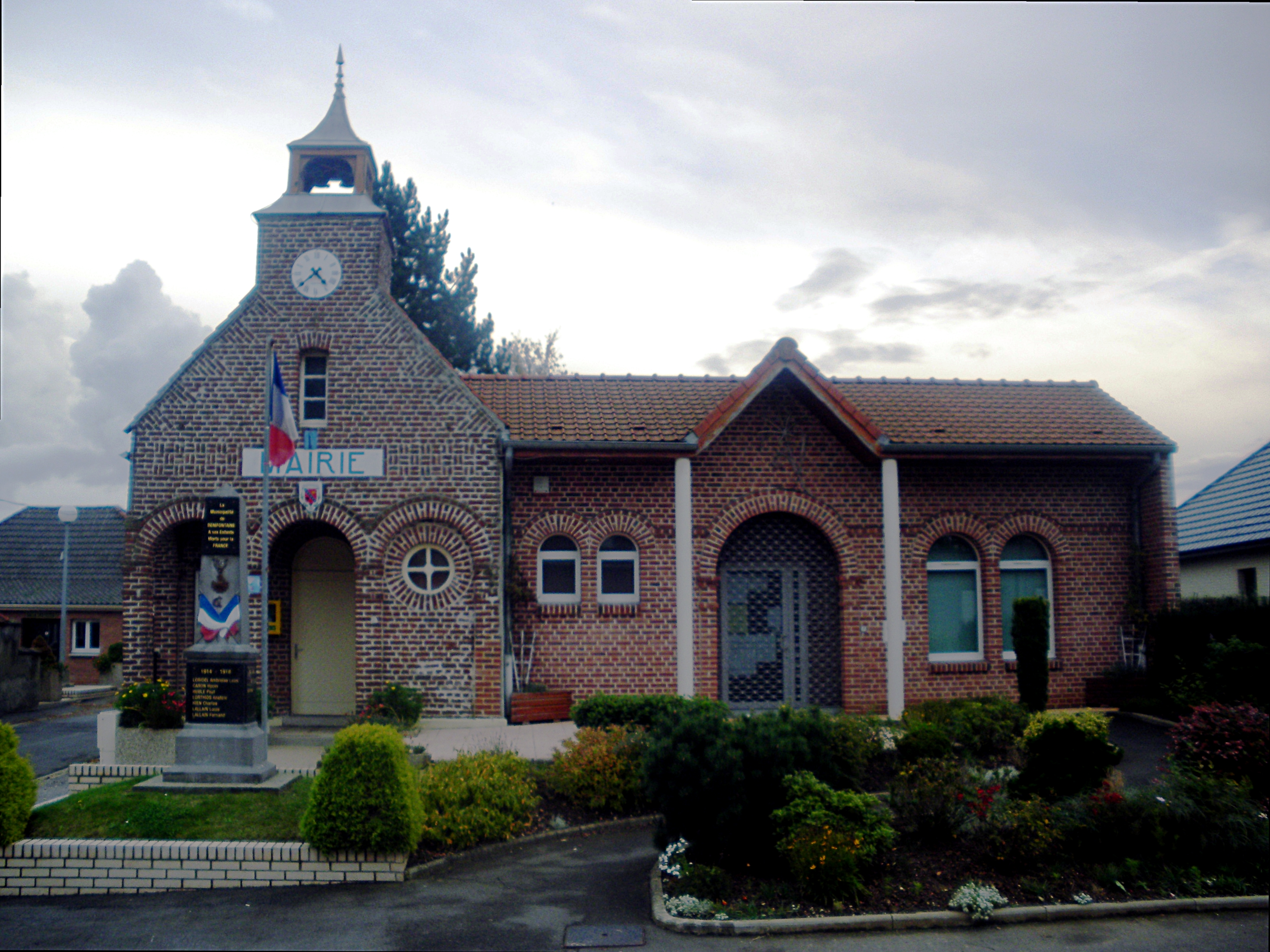
- The town hall of Bénifontaine

- Coat of arms
- Location of Bénifontaine
- Location within France Location within Hauts-de-France
- Coordinates: 50°29′16″N 2°49′52″E
- Country: France
- Region: Hauts-de-France
- Department: Pas-de-Calais
- Arrondissement: Lens
- Canton: Wingles
- Intercommunality: Communaupole de Lens-Liévin

Government
  - Mayor (2020–2026): Nicolas Godart
- Area^{1}: 4.84 km^{2} (1.87 sq mi)
- Elevation: 25 m (82 ft)
- Highest elevation: 54 m (177 ft)
- Lowest elevation: 22 m (72 ft)
- Population (2023): 330
  - Density: 68/km^{2} (180/sq mi)
- Time zone: UTC+01:00 (CET)
  - Summer (DST): UTC+02:00 (CEST)
- INSEE/Postal code: 62107 /62410
- ^{1} French Land Register data, which excludes lakes, ponds, glaciers > 1 km^{2} (0.386 sq mi or 247 acres) and river estuaries.

Bénifontaine (French pronunciation: [benifɔ̃tɛn]) is a commune in the Pas-de-Calais department in the Hauts-de-France region in northern France.

== Geography ==
A farming village situated just 4 miles (6.4 km) north of Lens at the junction of the N47 and D39 roads.
The airport of Lens-Bénifontaine (code LFQL) is located in the commune.

== History ==
The commune owes its name to the quality of the local water, which is used for brewing the regional Ch'Ti beer. During World War I, the village, along with many others, was completely destroyed.

== Population ==
Historical population
Year	Pop.	±% p.a.
1968	275	—
1975	289	+0.71%
1982	295	+0.29%
1990	303	+0.34%
1999	275	−1.07%
2007	299	+1.05%
2012	358	+3.67%
2017	356	−0.11%
2023	330	−1.26%
Source: INSEE

== Sights ==
- The Castelain Ch’ti brewery.
- The aerodrome.

== See also ==
- Communes of the Pas-de-Calais department
