= M2 gas mask =

French-made gas mask

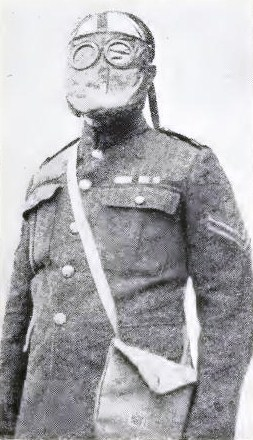
- British soldier demonstrating the mask
- Type: Gas mask
- Place of origin: France

Service history
- In service: 1916–1918
- Used by: See Users
- Wars: World War I

Production history
- Designer: René Louis Gravereaux
- Designed: 1915
- No. produced: 29,300,000

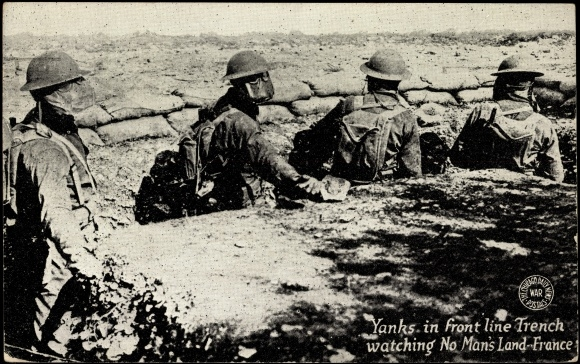
American soldiers wearing M2 gas masks in a frontline trench (1919 postcard image)

The M2 gas mask was a French-made gas mask used by French, British and American forces from April 1916 to August 1918 during World War I. The M2 was fabricated in large quantities, with about 29,300,000 being made during the war. It was intended to protect the wearer from at least five hours' exposure to phosgene gas, a common chemical weapon of the time.

== History ==
The M2 mask was based on a design proposed in 1915 by René Louis Gravereaux of Paris. An order of 600,000 masks was produced in February 1916 and introduced for British forces the following month. The first M2 model was produced in only one size and often incurred damage when it was folded for placement in a metal container. A second model introduced in April 1916 was produced in three different sizes and included two separate eyepieces, so folding it would not cause damage. British forces were issued 6.2 million units of the second model between May and November 1916 and used it as late as August 1918.

When the United States entered World War I in 1917, it was unprepared for chemical warfare. The US Army issued its soldiers the British-made Small Box Respirator to protect against chemical attack, and the French-made M2 gas mask in case a mask had to be worn for an extended period of time. The untrained soldiers tended to put on the Small Box Respirator when first confronted with a gas attack and then switch to the M2 when they realized they would have to wear it for a long time. While switching gear, some soldiers inhaled the poison gas and became casualties.

== Design ==
In contrast with gas masks made later in the war, the M2 did not have a special filter that fit onto the mask. Instead, it was made of one piece of material which covered the face completely. During 1917, an additional mask strap was produced, intended to be worn around the head of the wearer.

The first model of the M2 mask was introduced during March 1916 and had a rectangular piece of cellophane glass for viewing, protected by a piece of glass in front of it. In April, the rectangle was replaced by two round pieces of cellophane glass due to problems on the earlier model, which could not be cleaned without removing the glass. These two glasses were held in place by a metal ring on each eyehole, with 12 dents in each so as to better hold the glass on the mask.

== Protection ==
The M2 protected the wearer for at least five hours against the common World War I chemical weapon phosgene. After a while, condensation in the mask built up, which severely encumbered the wearer, requiring the mask to be taken off.

== Users ==
- France
- United Kingdom
- United States
