= Vendin-le-Vieil =

- Commune
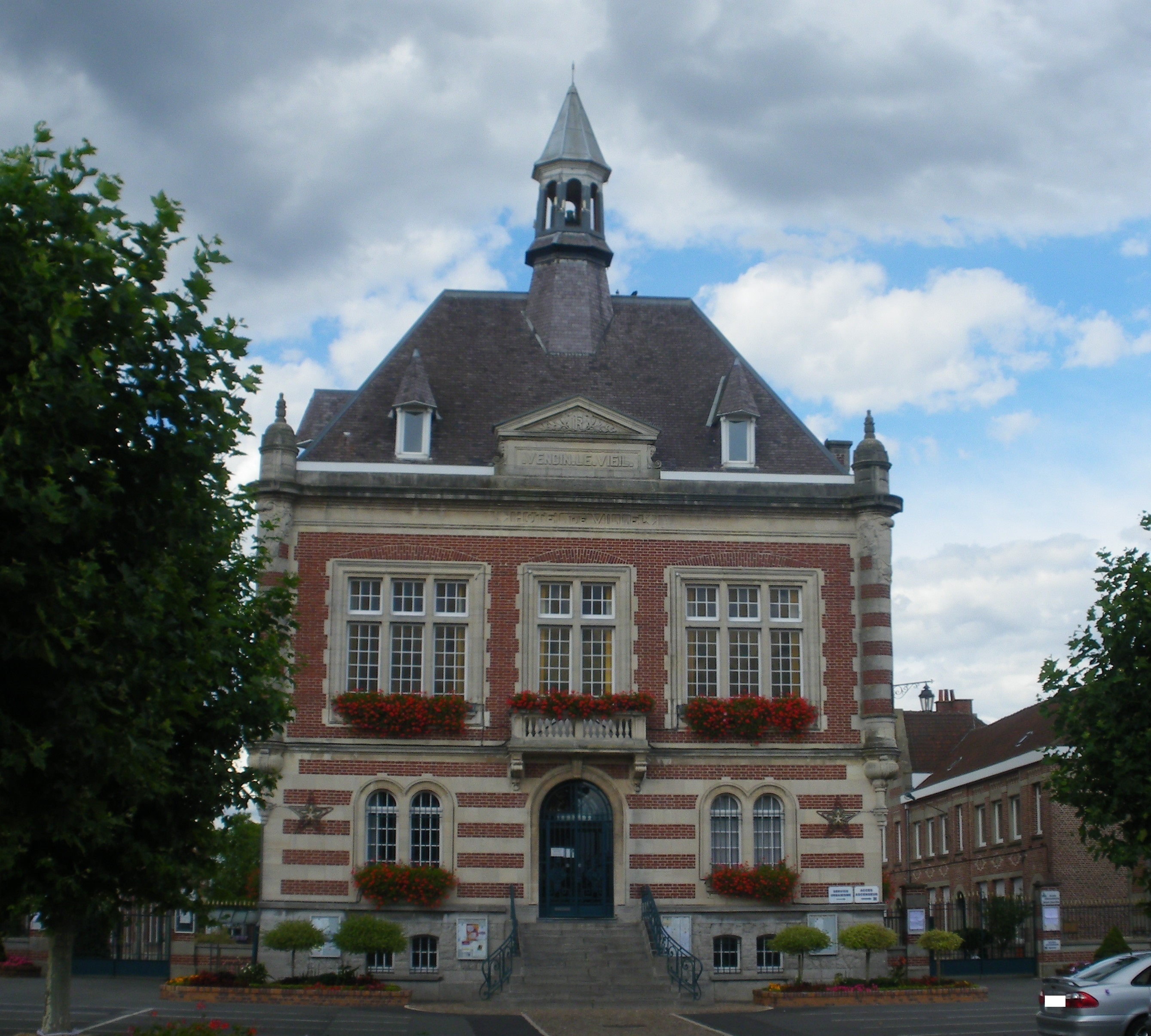
- The town hall of Vendin-le-Vieil
- Location of Vendin-le-Vieil
- Location within France Location within Hauts-de-France
- Coordinates: 50°28′29″N 2°52′00″E
- Country: France
- Region: Hauts-de-France
- Department: Pas-de-Calais
- Arrondissement: Lens
- Canton: Wingles
- Intercommunality: CA Lens-Liévin

Government
  - Mayor (2020–2026): Ludovic Gambiez
- Area^{1}: 10.67 km^{2} (4.12 sq mi)
- Elevation: 28 m (92 ft)
- Highest elevation: 66 m (217 ft)
- Lowest elevation: 20 m (66 ft)
- Population (2023): 8,536
  - Density: 800.0/km^{2} (2,072/sq mi)
- Time zone: UTC+01:00 (CET)
  - Summer (DST): UTC+02:00 (CEST)
- INSEE/Postal code: 62842 /62880
- ^{1} French Land Register data, which excludes lakes, ponds, glaciers > 1 km^{2} (0.386 sq mi or 247 acres) and river estuaries.

Vendin-le-Vieil (French pronunciation: [vɑ̃dɛ̃ lə vjɛj]; Picard: Vindin-l'Vieil) is a commune in the Pas-de-Calais department in the Hauts-de-France region of France.

== Geography ==
An ex-coalmining area, once boasting 2 pits, now a farming and light industrial town, Vendin-le-Vieil lies 4 miles (6.4 km) northeast of Lens, at the junction of the D38e and the D164e roads.

== Population ==
Historical population
Year	Pop.	±% p.a.
1968	7,208	—
1975	6,866	−0.69%
1982	6,934	+0.14%
1990	6,938	+0.01%
1999	6,798	−0.23%
2007	7,189	+0.70%
2012	7,787	+1.61%
2017	8,608	+2.02%
2023	8,536	−0.14%
Source: INSEE

== Places of interest ==
- The church of St.Leger, rebuilt along with the rest of the town, after World War I.
- The modern church of St. Auguste.

== See also ==
- Communes of the Pas-de-Calais department
