= Meurchin =

- Commune
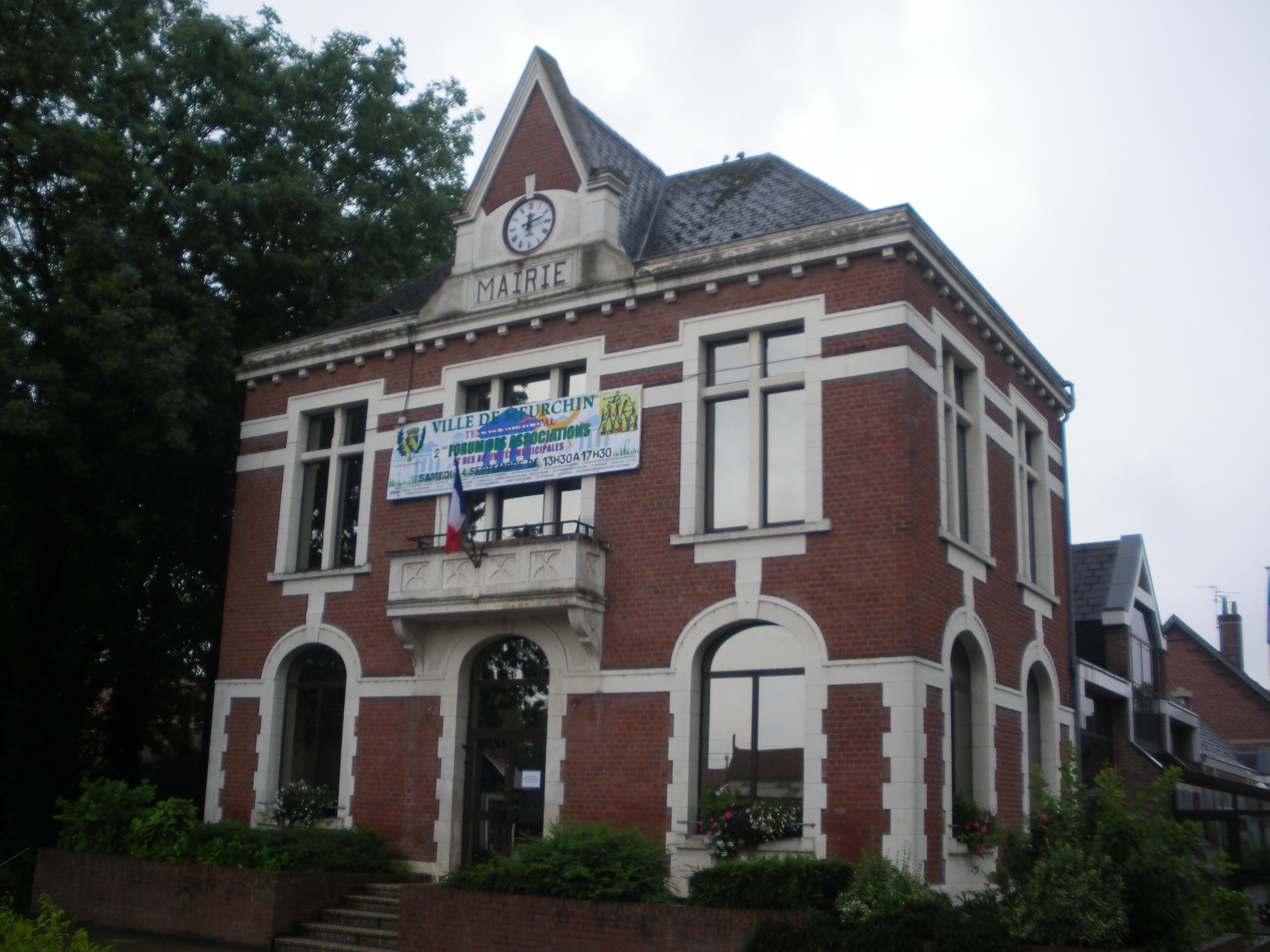
- The town hall of Meurchin

- Coat of arms
- Location of Meurchin
- Location within France Location within Hauts-de-France
- Coordinates: 50°29′52″N 2°53′27″E
- Country: France
- Region: Hauts-de-France
- Department: Pas-de-Calais
- Arrondissement: Lens
- Canton: Wingles
- Intercommunality: CA Lens-Liévin

Government
  - Mayor (2020–2026): Frédéric Alloï
- Area^{1}: 4.64 km^{2} (1.79 sq mi)
- Elevation: 26 m (85 ft)
- Highest elevation: 45 m (148 ft)
- Lowest elevation: 17 m (56 ft)
- Population (2023): 3,691
  - Density: 795/km^{2} (2,060/sq mi)
- Time zone: UTC+01:00 (CET)
  - Summer (DST): UTC+02:00 (CEST)
- INSEE/Postal code: 62573 /62410
- ^{1} French Land Register data, which excludes lakes, ponds, glaciers > 1 km^{2} (0.386 sq mi or 247 acres) and river estuaries.

Meurchin (French pronunciation: [mœʁʃɛ̃]) is a commune in the Pas-de-Calais department in the Hauts-de-France region of France. 7 miles (11 km) northeast of Lens.

== Population ==
Historical population
Year	Pop.	±% p.a.
1968	3,397	—
1975	3,252	−0.62%
1982	3,422	+0.73%
1990	3,748	+1.14%
1999	3,632	−0.35%
2007	3,662	+0.10%
2012	3,761	+0.53%
2017	3,786	+0.13%
2023	3,691	−0.42%
Source: INSEE

== See also ==
- Communes of the Pas-de-Calais department
