= Hulluch =

- Commune
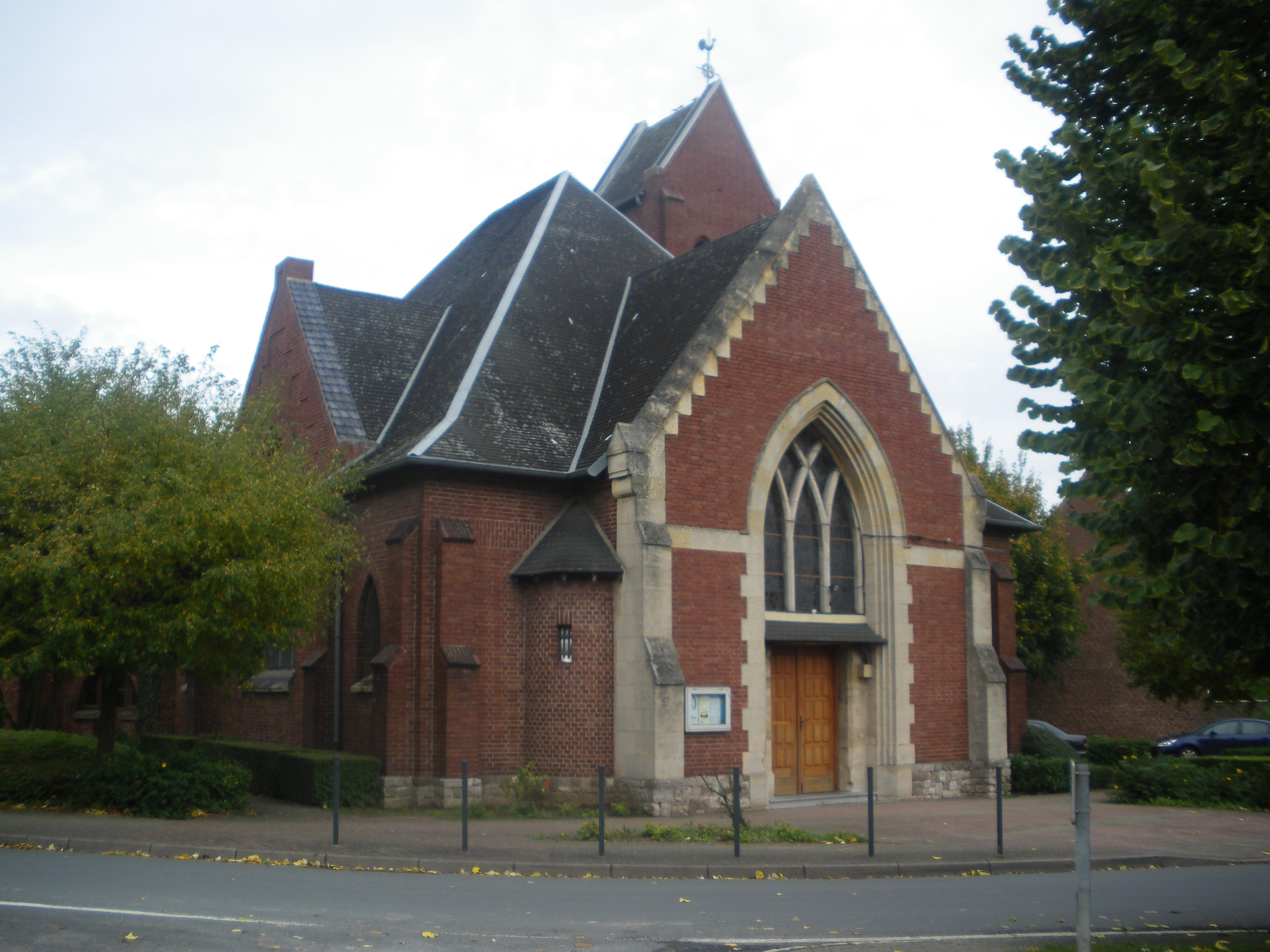
- The church of Hulluch

- Coat of arms
- Location of Hulluch
- Location within France Location within Hauts-de-France
- Coordinates: 50°29′12″N 2°49′03″E
- Country: France
- Region: Hauts-de-France
- Department: Pas-de-Calais
- Arrondissement: Lens
- Canton: Wingles
- Intercommunality: CA Lens-Liévin

Government
  - Mayor (2020–2026): André Kuchcinski
- Area^{1}: 5.74 km^{2} (2.22 sq mi)
- Elevation: 76 m (249 ft)
- Highest elevation: 51 m (167 ft)
- Lowest elevation: 21 m (69 ft)
- Population (2023): 3,371
  - Density: 587/km^{2} (1,520/sq mi)
- Time zone: UTC+01:00 (CET)
  - Summer (DST): UTC+02:00 (CEST)
- INSEE/Postal code: 62464 /62410
- ^{1} French Land Register data, which excludes lakes, ponds, glaciers > 1 km^{2} (0.386 sq mi or 247 acres) and river estuaries.

Hulluch (French pronunciation: [yly]) is a commune in the Pas-de-Calais department in the Hauts-de-France region of France about 4 miles (6.4 km) north of Lens.

== Population ==
Historical population
Year	Pop.	±% p.a.
1968	3,995	—
1975	3,828	−0.61%
1982	3,160	−2.70%
1990	3,005	−0.63%
1999	2,971	−0.13%
2007	3,161	+0.78%
2012	3,028	−0.86%
2017	3,448	+2.63%
2023	3,371	−0.38%
Source: INSEE

== See also ==
- Communes of the Pas-de-Calais department
