= PH helmet =

British gas mask

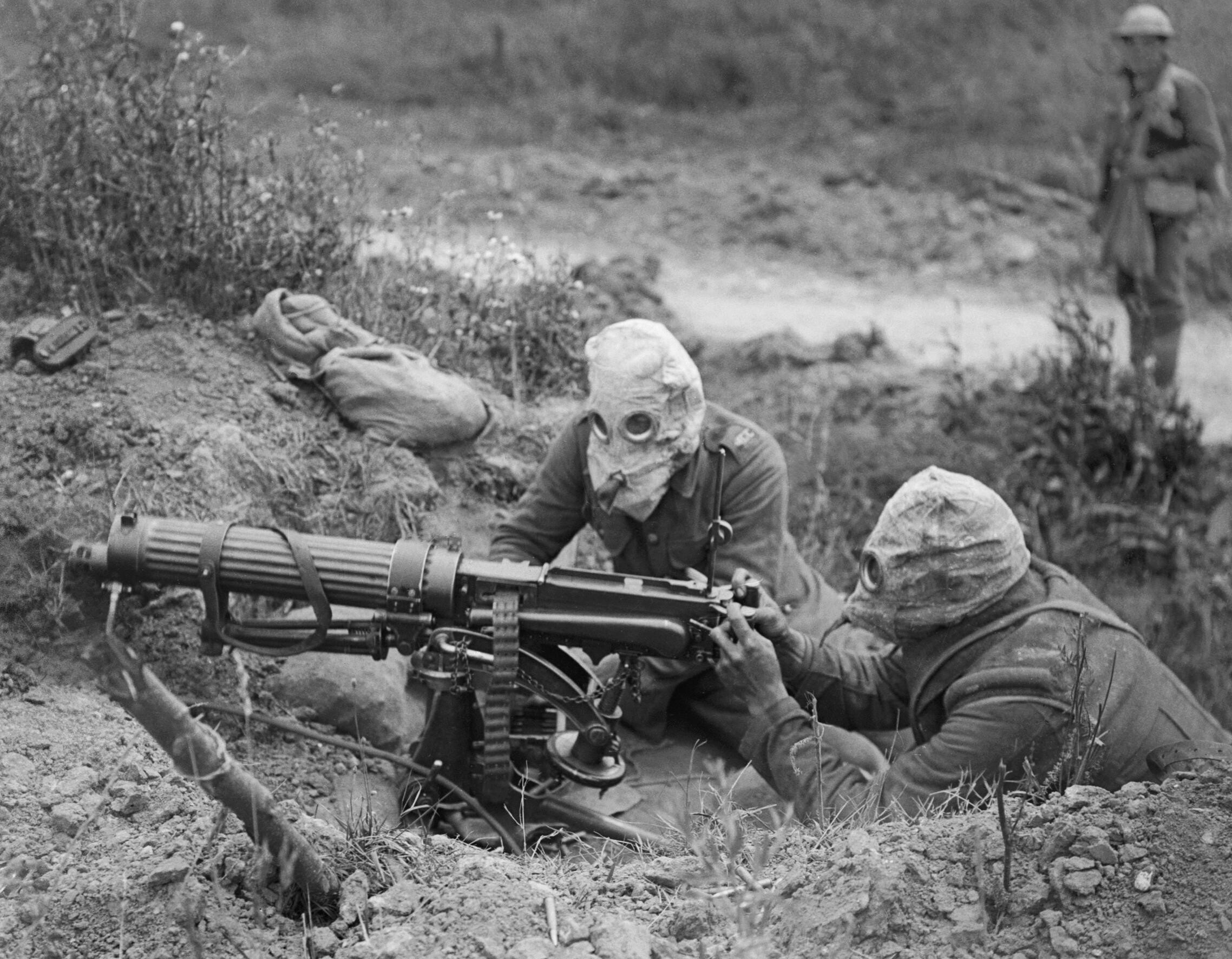
British Vickers machine gun crew wearing PH-type anti-gas helmets near Ovillers during the Battle of the Somme, July 1916

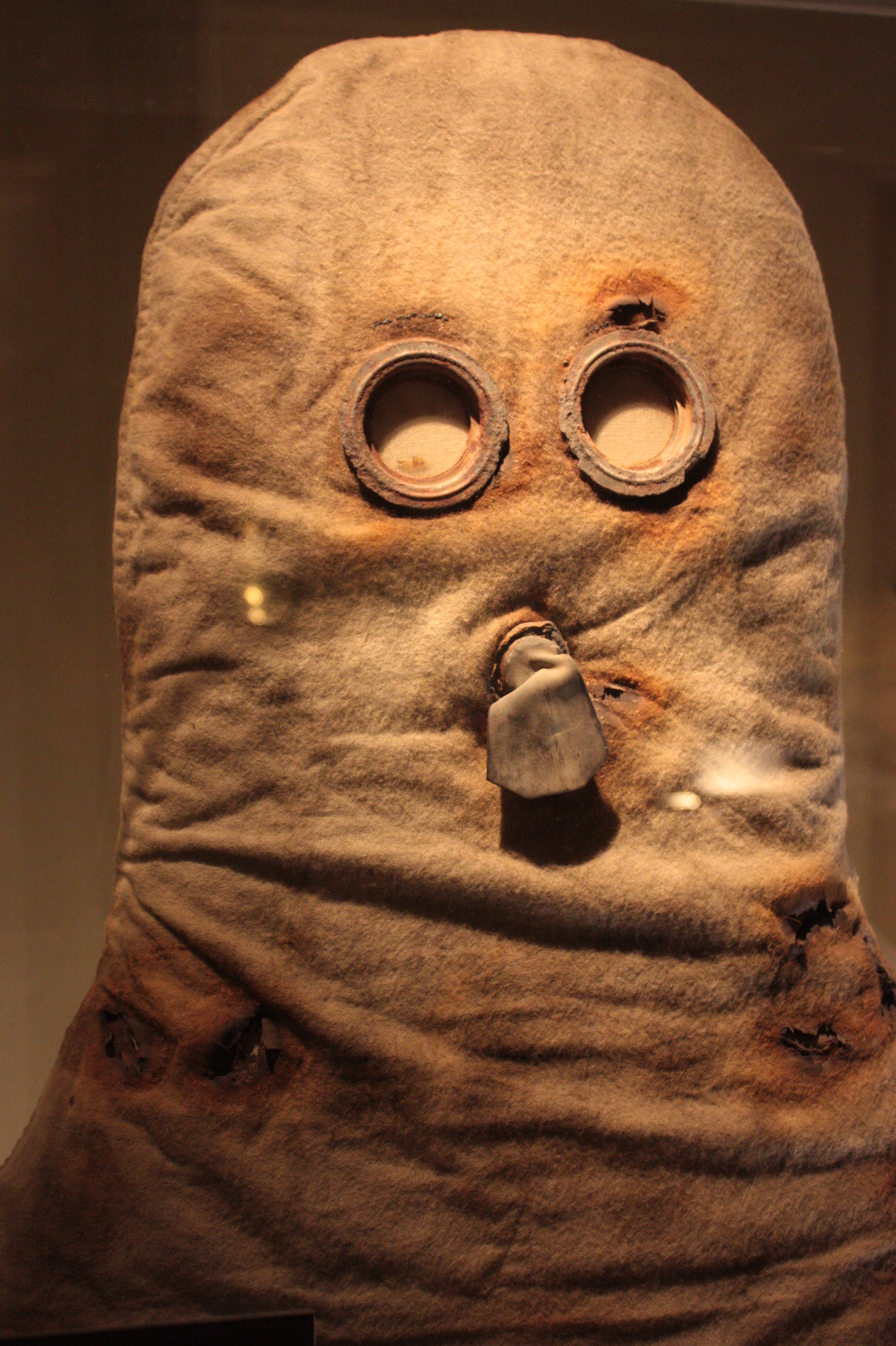
A World War I British P Helmet c.1915

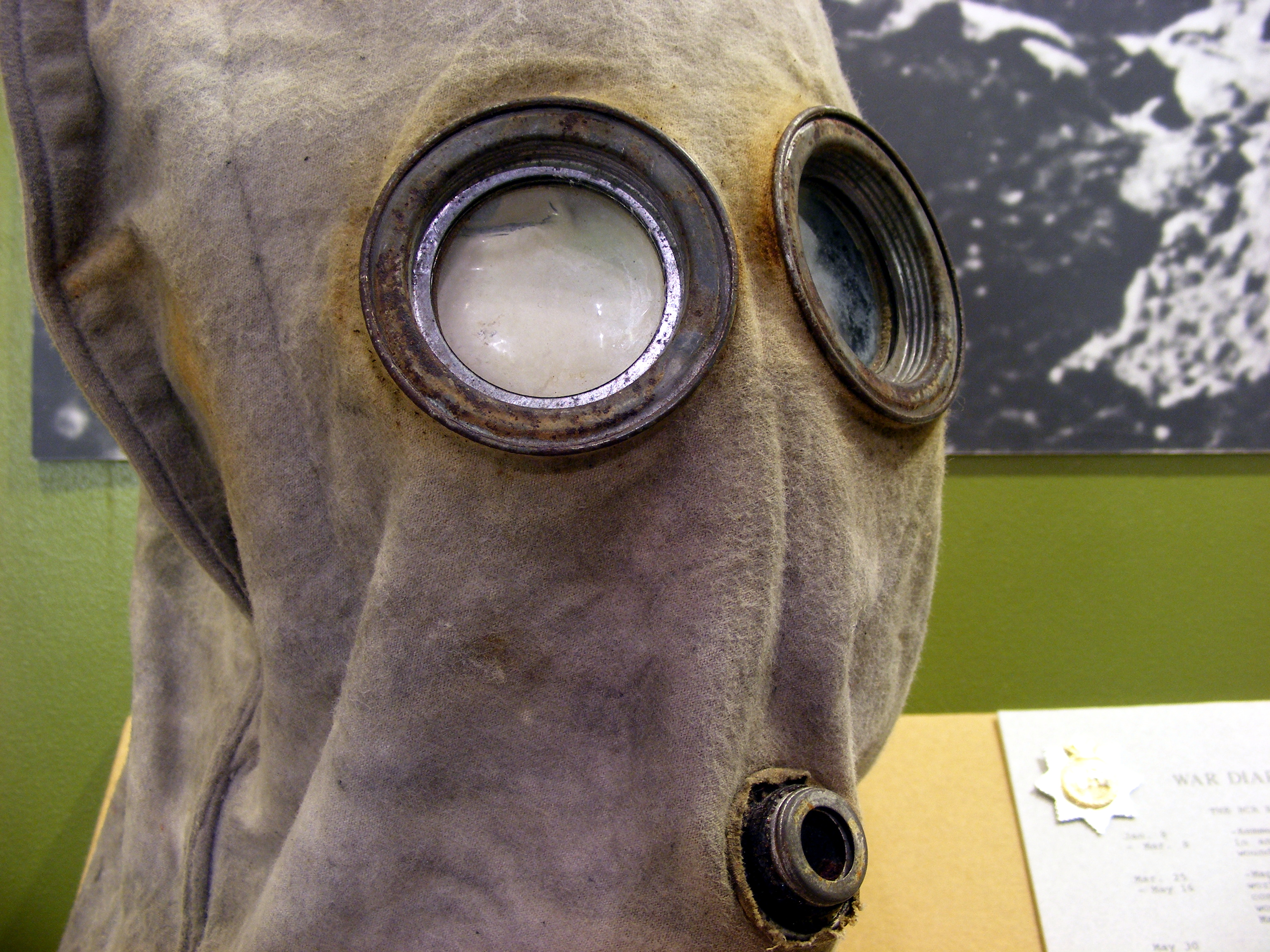
PH-type helmet in Royal Canadian Regiment Museum. It is missing its exhale valve.

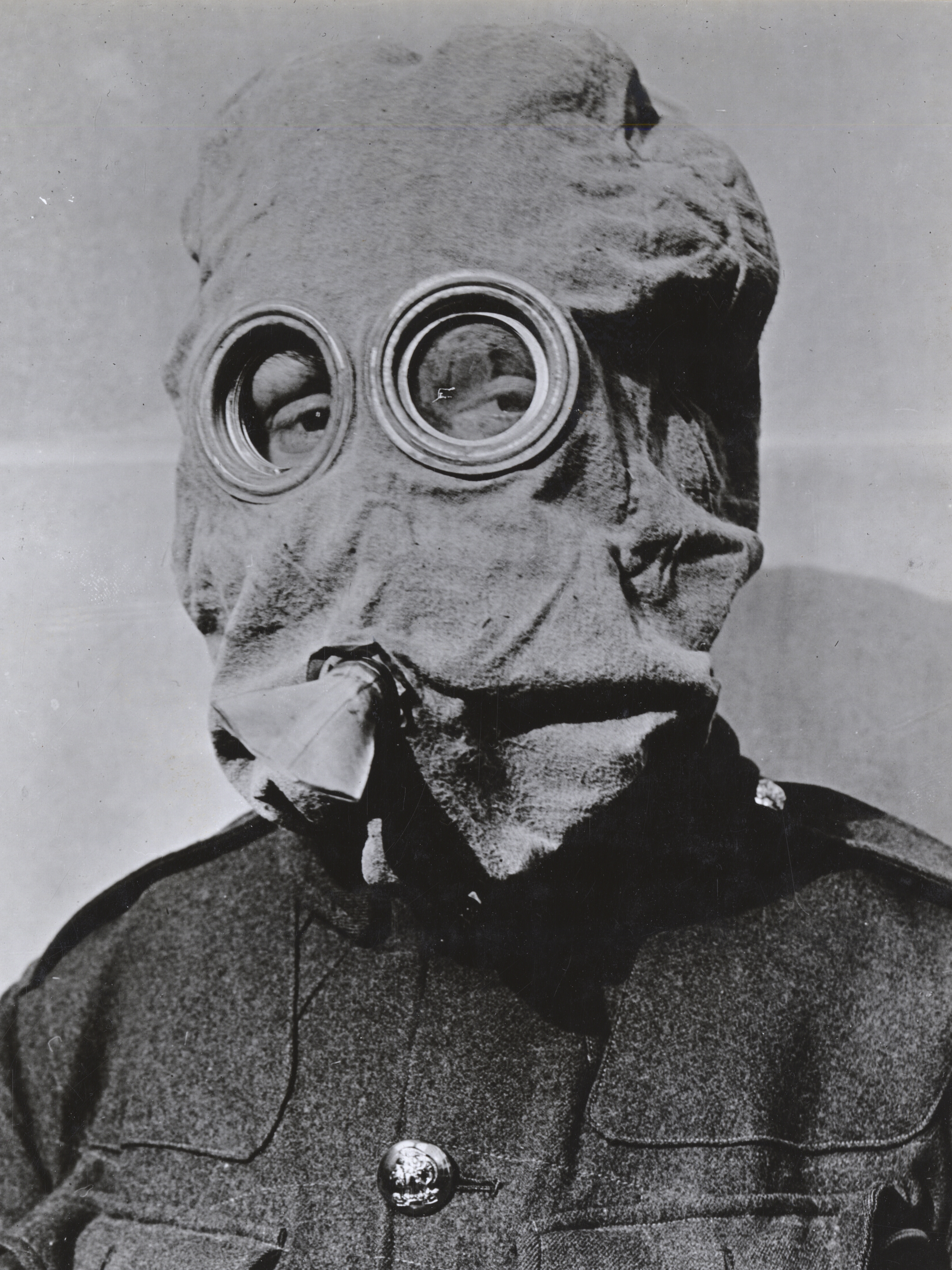
Gas mask, WWI

The P helmet, PH helmet and PHG helmet were early types of gas mask issued by the British Army in the First World War, to protect troops against chlorine, phosgene and tear gases. Rather than having a separate filter for removing the toxic chemicals, they consisted of a gas-permeable hood worn over the head which was treated with chemicals.

The P (or Phenate) Helmet, officially called the Tube Helmet, appeared in July 1915, replacing the simpler Hypo Helmet. It featured two mica eyepieces instead of the single visor of its predecessor, and added an exhale valve fed from a metal tube which the wearer held in his mouth. The exhale valve was needed because a double layer of flannel – one treated and one not – was needed because the solution attacked the fabric.

It had flannel layers of cloth-dipped in sodium phenolate and glycerin and protected against chlorine and phosgene, but not against tear gas. Around 9 million were made.

The PH Helmet (Phenate Hexamine) replaced it in January 1916, and added hexamethylene tetramine, which greatly improved protection against phosgene and added protection against hydrocyanic acid. Around 14 million were made and it remained in service until the end of the war by which time it was relegated to second line use. The PHG Helmet appeared in January 1916 and was similar to the PH Helmet but had a facepiece made of rubber sponge to add protection against tear gas. Around one and a half million were produced in 1916–1917.

It was finally superseded by the small box respirator in 1916, which was much more satisfactory against high concentrations of phosgene or lachrymators.
