= Small box respirator =

British gas mask

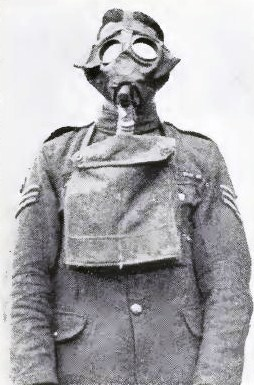
A British soldier wearing the Small Box Respirator during World War I

The Small Box Respirator (SBR) was a British gas mask of the First World War and a successor to the Large Box Respirator. In late 1916, the respirator was introduced by the British with the aim to provide reliable protection against chlorine and phosgene gases. The respirator offered a first line of defence against these. The Germans began using mustard gas, a vesicant ("blister agent") that burned the skin of individuals exposed to it. Death rates were high with exposure to both the mixed phosgene, chlorine, and mustard gas. However, with soldiers having readily available access to the small box respirator, death rates had lowered significantly. Light and reasonably fitting, the respirator was a key piece of equipment to protect soldiers on the battlefield.

== Materials and construction ==
The small box respirator consists of a face mask made of rubberized fabric connected by a rubber fabric hose to a canister made of tinplate containing a chemical absorbent. The respirator mask is light in weight and is made from khaki cotton fabric that is plated with a thin layer of black rubber. Khaki cotton tape, located in the middle of forehead region of the mask, connects to black elastic strips from the cheeks to ascertain a suitable fit for the carrier. The circular eye pieces are set in metal rims that are consistent of celloid which is sealed on with rubber sealant. A circular wired nose clip with rubber covered jaws sits between the internal region of the eyes. The mask contains an internal mouthpiece with an exhale valve made of black rubber consisting of a flange to fit both mouth and teeth. The mouthpiece is joined by a brass tube to the rubberized hose leading to the canister. The rubber hose is around 30 cm in length and is made of vulcanized stockinette fabric making the hose flexible and strong.

The canister, which was oval in cross section, contained cotton and wire gauze filters (introduced in April 1917 to catch chlorarsine compound particulates (Note: The physical filter materials were added, due to British use of stannic chloride in their own gas shells, before the Germans started using chlorarsine in theirs)) with charcoal and quicklime. This was later switched over to charcoal and soda lime to more effectively absorb the poison gases.

== History of use ==
=== Chemical gas attacks ===
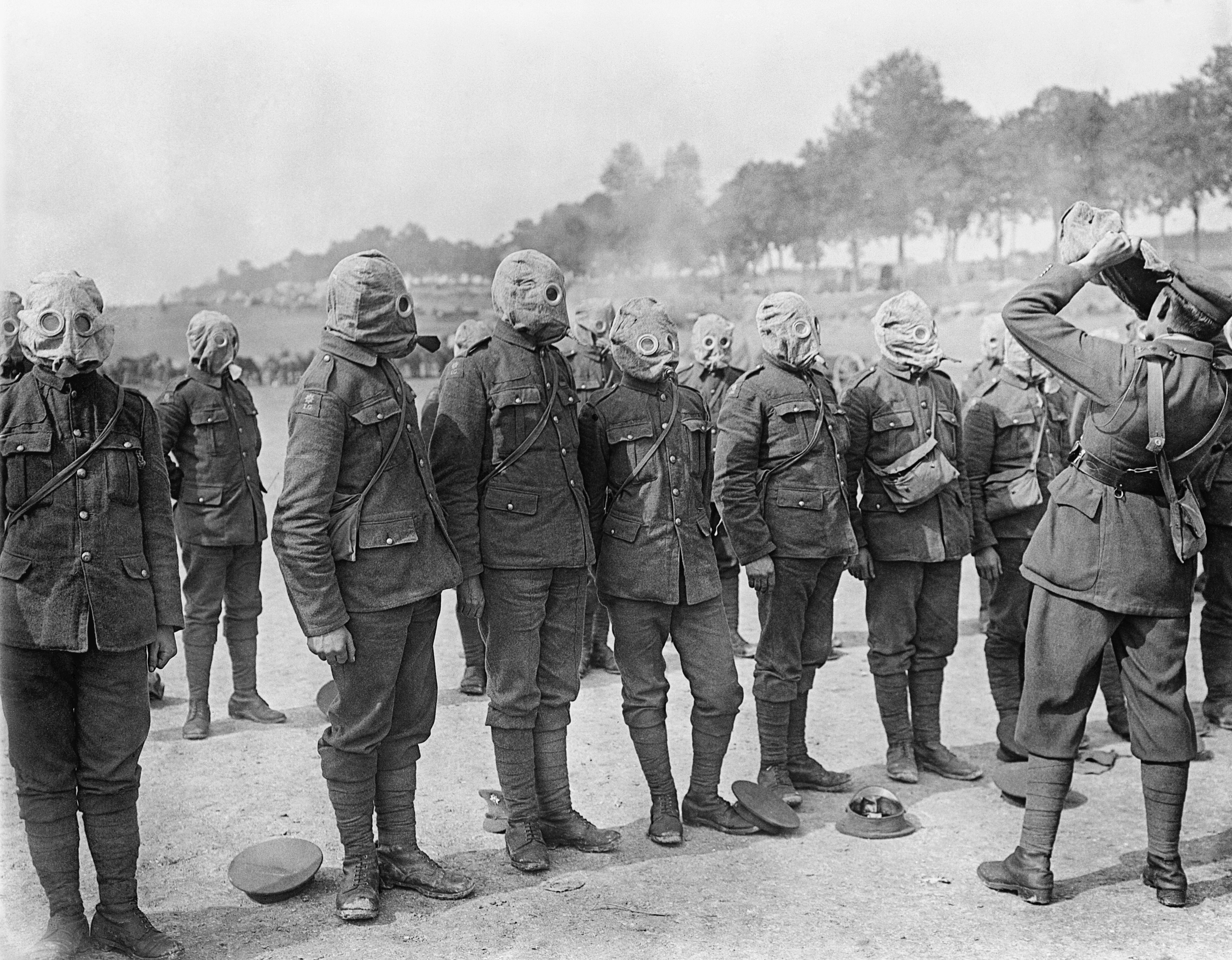
Members of the Irish Guards conduct a test with P helmets before going into combat.

The Small Box Respirators were introduced into British and Imperial forces on the Western Front in 1916 and issue was complete early in 1917. The first use of phosgene and chlorine gas in combination had been on 19 December 1915, when it was used against French and Canadian units in the Second Battle of Ypres. It was used in six attacks up to August 1916. British anti-gas helmets - P then PH and PHG - were appointed to repel the chlorine gas; issues later presented when the helmets could not withstand the effects of the phosgene gas. Chlorine was readily detected in battles as the gas tainted a yellowish green cloud and had a pungent odour. The situation became problematic on the introduction of the mixed phosgene and chlorine as phosgene is colourless and smells of freshly cut hay. Phosgene was up to six times as potent than chlorine and did not suggest any urgent symptoms that was associated with the coughing and discomfort that chlorine did. Psychological impacts of the gas had resulted in unexplained anxiety attacks which would cause men to tear off their gas masks to breathe correctly exposing them to the gas. Soldiers that were affected by the gas, did not recall feeling symptoms until hours later. 85% of the fatalities that occurred due to chemical weapons were from the phosgene mixed chlorine gas. Small box respirators lowered mortality rates significantly; for this reason the creation and usage of the mustard gas, a vesicant that burned the skin, was introduced as the new weapon of chemical warfare in 1917.

=== Canadian Usage ===
Canadian troops began to receive small box respirators in late November 1916. While the respirators acted as the first line of defence in some British troops, other Canadian and some British troops were still using the earlier and less effective gas masks, the PH helmet. The PH helmet was used throughout early 1916 by British troops in which was designed to be tucked under the shirt of the wearer. The masks were an evolution of the P Helmet, and were effective against phosgene gas by adding hexamine to sodium phenate solution which acted as an absorbent to the phosgene gas. Both equipment were to be present on the troop members during battle. It became an increasing issue that PH helmets were being dropped and lost during battle; an estimated 9 million PH helmets were dropped while barely any respirators were lost. Canadian and British troops were not convinced that double the protection was needed. Both masks were liable to damage and therefore it became necessary to have both masks .

=== Complications of the small box respirator ===
Small box respirators were criticised by troops. The respirator restricted performance as it created a very unnatural way of breathing during heavy activity on the battlefield. The respirator came in six different sizes and had to be individually fitted to each man, and to be effective the fit had to checked constantly. The eye pieces were very prone to fogging and misting obstructing vision and the nose clip caused extreme discomfort. The flexible hose was vulnerable to damage and then let gas in. Adjusting the gas mask was problematic, death could be the result if it was not worn correctly; soldiers had compulsory practice with the mask before using it in combat. The respirator caused intensive wheezing and extreme heat and exhaustion could result in suffocation-like symptoms.

=== Evolution of the small box respirator ===
The first and proper respirator developed was the Black Veil Respirator by John Scott Haldane. It was used on the evening of 22 April 1915 in Belgium, close to Ypres, by British troops. Home made respirators, known as the black veil, comprised cotton wool that was wrapped in either muslin or flannelette. The mask was ineffective and almost completely useless when dry. When the mask was either moist and wet from being soaked in the absorbent solution, it formed an airtight fit over the troops mouth and noise. The cotton, which was loosely woven material, provided better absorption of the solution and allowed troop members to breathe effectively. A long piece of black veil cotton was folded to form a large sheath pocket to retain the chemical absorbents. The cotton veil was then wrapped around the user's head and tied. The chemical absorbents consisting of anti gas chemicals such as sodium hyposulfite, washing soda, glycerine acetate and water allowed for consistent and dense moisturizing in the respirator. The respirator could be worn above the eyes to protect against tear gas. The structure and material of the respirator made it effective for about five minutes against the regular dosage concentrations of chlorine attacks. The mask was issued at 20 May 1915. A more effective respirator that could last longer was needed; the hypo helmet was created in hopes it would replace the inferior respirator.

Earlier versions of the gas mask prior to 1915s development of the small box respirator were crude and ineffective as no troops had yet experienced poison warfare. One of the first gas masks seen in the early part of the war was the British hypo helmet, after recent failure and ineffectiveness of the black veil respirator. The helmet was intended to replace the black veil in order to effectively protect against chlorine attacks. Yet, the mask provided unreliable protection as the eye pieces were extremely fragile. The protective valve of the Hypo Helmet was vulnerable and prone to breaking. The helmet, much like the black veil, was dipped in anti-gas chemicals such as sodium hyposulphite, washing soda, glycerine and water. The choice of chemicals used was refined to develop better and more effective masks. The helmet was made from viyella (cotton wool blend) and flannel fabric that was refined from material made from mica, which was brittle and damage prone. The helmet was hot and uncomfortable as the fitting required users to tuck inside uniforms. The helmet was a large improvement on the black veil but it was difficult for soldiers to use weapons with the helmet on. The helmet accumulated carbon dioxide in the uniforms of the users as no expiration valve was present. It was issued to troops by 6 June 1915.

The later and more refined gas mask in the form of the Large Box Respirator was developed and issued by April 1916 to specialist troops such as machine gunners, signallers and artillery. This was followed by the small box respirator.
