= Loos-en-Gohelle =

- Commune
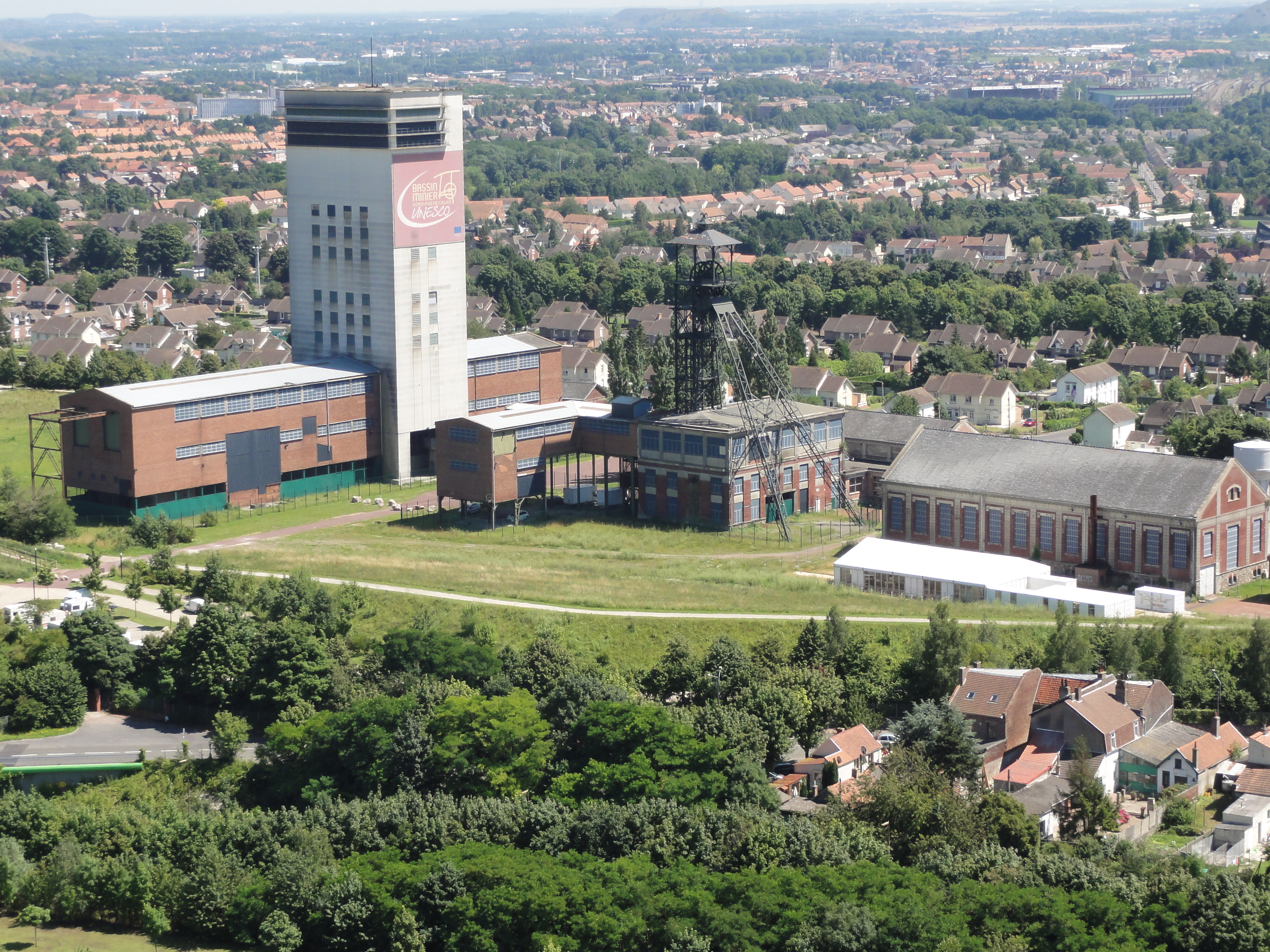
- Mine 11–19 at Loos-en-Gohelle

- Coat of arms
- Location of Loos-en-Gohelle
- Location within France Location within Hauts-de-France
- Coordinates: 50°27′30″N 2°47′39″E
- Country: France
- Region: Hauts-de-France
- Department: Pas-de-Calais
- Arrondissement: Lens
- Canton: Wingles
- Intercommunality: CA Lens-Liévin

Government
  - Mayor (2023–2026): Geoffrey Mathon
- Area^{1}: 12.7 km^{2} (4.9 sq mi)
- Elevation: 44 m (144 ft)
- Highest elevation: 74 m (243 ft)
- Lowest elevation: 31 m (102 ft)
- Population (2023): 6,799
  - Density: 535/km^{2} (1,390/sq mi)
- Time zone: UTC+01:00 (CET)
  - Summer (DST): UTC+02:00 (CEST)
- INSEE/Postal code: 62528 /62750
- ^{1} French Land Register data, which excludes lakes, ponds, glaciers > 1 km^{2} (0.386 sq mi or 247 acres) and river estuaries.

Loos-en-Gohelle (French pronunciation: [lɔs ɑ̃ ɡɔɛl], lit. 'Loos in Gohelle') is a commune in the Pas-de-Calais department in the Hauts-de-France region of France.

== Geography ==
It is a former coal mining town, three miles northwest of the centre of Lens. The two largest (184 m & 182 m) spoil heaps in Europe are in Loos-en-Gohelle, those of pits 11 and 19, and are visible for miles around. They are part of the mines of the Nord-Pas de Calais region that have become the 38th French site on the list of UNESCO World Heritage Sites as "a living and changing landscape".

== Population ==
Historical population
Year	Pop.	±% p.a.
1968	7,733	—
1975	6,958	−1.50%
1982	6,706	−0.53%
1990	6,561	−0.27%
1999	6,992	+0.71%
2007	6,816	−0.32%
2012	6,647	−0.50%
2017	6,751	+0.31%
2023	6,799	+0.12%
Source: INSEE

== See also ==
- Communes of the Pas-de-Calais department
