= Respirator =

Device worn to protect the user from inhaling contaminants

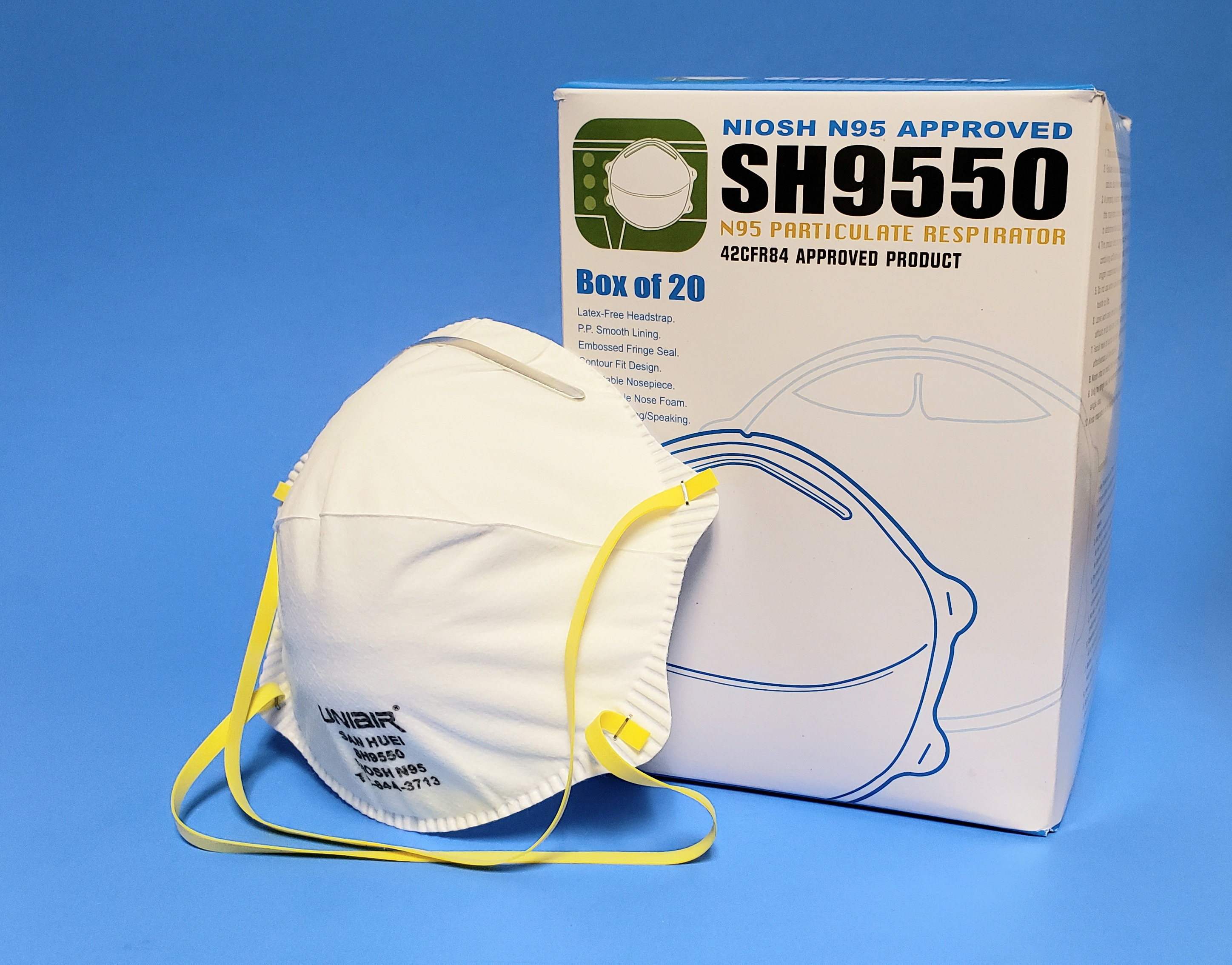
- White, disposable cup N95 filtering facepiece respirator
- Other name(s): mask
- Regulated by: National Institute for Occupational Safety and Health, National Fire Protection Association, American National Standards Institute, United States Food and Drug Administration, Canadian Standards Association
- Regulation: 42 CFR 84, NFPA 1981, ANSI Z88.7-2001, 21 CFR 878.4040, EN 143, EN 149, EN 137, EN 14387
- [edit on Wikidata]

A respirator is type of mask designed to protect the wearer from inhaling hazardous atmospheres including lead fumes, vapors, gases and particulate matter such as dusts and airborne pathogens such as viruses. There are two main categories of respirators: the air-purifying respirator, in which respirable air is obtained by filtering a contaminated atmosphere, and the air-supplied respirator, in which an alternate supply of breathable air is delivered. Within each category, different techniques are employed to reduce or eliminate noxious airborne contaminants.

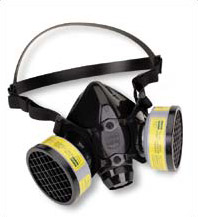
A half-face elastomeric air-purifying respirator. This kind of respirator is reusable, with the filters being replaced periodically.

Air-purifying respirators range from relatively inexpensive, single-use, disposable face masks, known as filtering facepiece respirators, reusable models with replaceable cartridges called elastomeric respirators, to powered air-purifying respirators (PAPR), which use a pump or fan to constantly move air through a filter and supply purified air into a mask, helmet or hood.

== History ==
=== Earliest records to 19th century ===
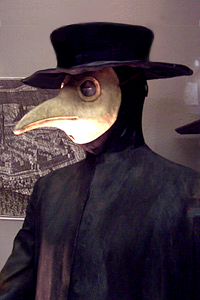
Plague doctor

The history of protective respiratory equipment can be traced back as far as the first century, when Pliny the Elder (c. 23 AD–79) described using animal bladder skins to protect workers in Roman mines from red lead oxide dust. In the 16th century, Leonardo da Vinci suggested that a finely woven cloth dipped in water could protect sailors from a toxic weapon made of powder that he had designed.

Alexander von Humboldt introduced a primitive respirator in 1799 when he worked as a mining engineer in Prussia.

Julius Jeffreys first used the word "respirator" as a mask in 1836.

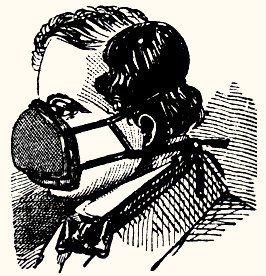
Woodcut of Stenhouse's mask

In 1848, the first US patent for an air-purifying respirator was granted to Lewis P. Haslett for his 'Haslett's Lung Protector,' which filtered dust from the air using one-way clapper valves and a filter made of moistened wool or a similar porous substance. Hutson Hurd patented a cup-shaped mask in 1879 which became widespread in industrial use.

Inventors in Europe included John Stenhouse, a Scottish chemist, who investigated the power of charcoal in its various forms, to capture and hold large volumes of gas. He built one of the first respirators able to remove toxic gases from the air, paving the way for activated charcoal to become the most widely used filter for respirators. Irish physicist John Tyndall took Stenhouse's mask, added a filter of cotton wool saturated with lime, glycerin, and charcoal, and in 1871 invented a 'fireman's respirator', a hood that filtered smoke and gas from air, which he exhibited at a meeting of the Royal Society in London in 1874. Also in 1874, Samuel Barton patented a device that 'permitted respiration in places where the atmosphere is charged with noxious gases, or vapors, smoke, or other impurities.'

In the 1890s, the German surgeon Johannes Mikulicz began using a "mundbinde" ("mouth bandage") of sterilized cloth as a barrier against microorganisms moving from him to his patients. Along with his surgical assistant Wilhelm Hübener, he adapted a chloroform mask with two layers of cotton mull. Experiments conducted by Hübener showed that the "mouth bandage" or "surgical mask" (German: Operationsmaske, as Hübener called it) blocked bacteria.

=== 20th century ===
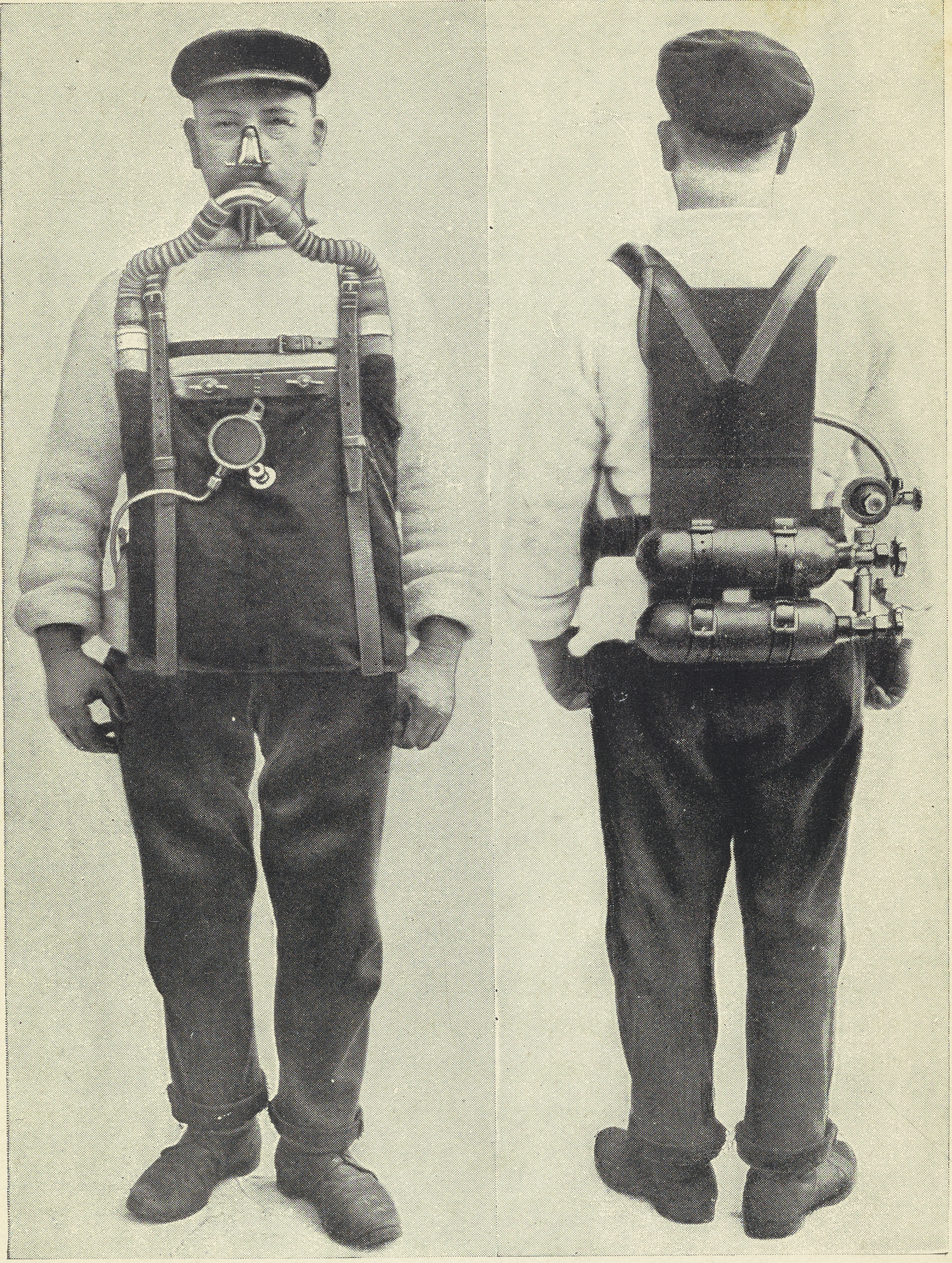
"How a Man may Breathe Safely in a Poisonous Atmosphere", an apparatus providing oxygen while using caustic soda to absorb carbon dioxide, 1909

In the winter of 1910, Dr Wu Lien Teh was given instructions from the Foreign Office of the Imperial Qing court in Peking, to travel to Harbin to investigate an unknown disease that killed 99.9% of its victims. This was the beginning of the large pneumonic plague epidemic of Manchuria and Mongolia, which ultimately claimed 60,000 lives.

Wu was able to conduct a postmortem (usually not accepted in China at the time) on a Japanese woman who had died of the plague. Having ascertained via the autopsy that the plague was spreading by air, Wu invented the face mask which became the precursor of the N95 respirator. Gérald Mesny, a prominent French doctor who had come to replace Wu, refused to wear the mask and died days later of the plague. The mask was widely produced, with Wu overseeing the production and distribution of 60,000 masks in a later epidemic, and it featured in many press images.

==== World War I ====
The First World War brought about the first need for mass-produced gas masks on both sides because of extensive use of chemical weapons. The German army successfully used poison gas for the first time against Allied troops at the Second Battle of Ypres, Belgium on April 22, 1915. An immediate response was cotton wool wrapped in muslin, issued to the troops by May 1. This was followed by the Black Veil Respirator, invented by John Scott Haldane, which was a cotton pad soaked in an absorbent solution which was secured over the mouth using black cotton veiling.

Seeking to improve on the Black Veil respirator, Cluny Macpherson created a mask made of chemical-absorbing fabric which fitted over the entire head: a 50.5 cm × 48 cm (19.9 in × 18.9 in) canvas hood treated with chlorine-absorbing chemicals, and fitted with a transparent mica eyepiece. Macpherson presented his idea to the British War Office Anti-Gas Department on May 10, 1915; prototypes were developed soon after. The design was adopted by the British Army and introduced as the British Smoke Hood in June 1915; Macpherson was appointed to the War Office Committee for Protection against Poisonous Gases. More elaborate sorbent compounds were added later to further iterations of his helmet (PH helmet), to defeat other respiratory poison gases used such as phosgene, diphosgene and chloropicrin. In summer and autumn 1915, Edward Harrison, Bertram Lambert and John Sadd developed the Large Box Respirator. This canister gas mask had a tin can containing the absorbent materials by a hose and began to be issued in February 1916. A compact version, the Small Box Respirator, was made a universal issue from August 1916.

==== United States ====
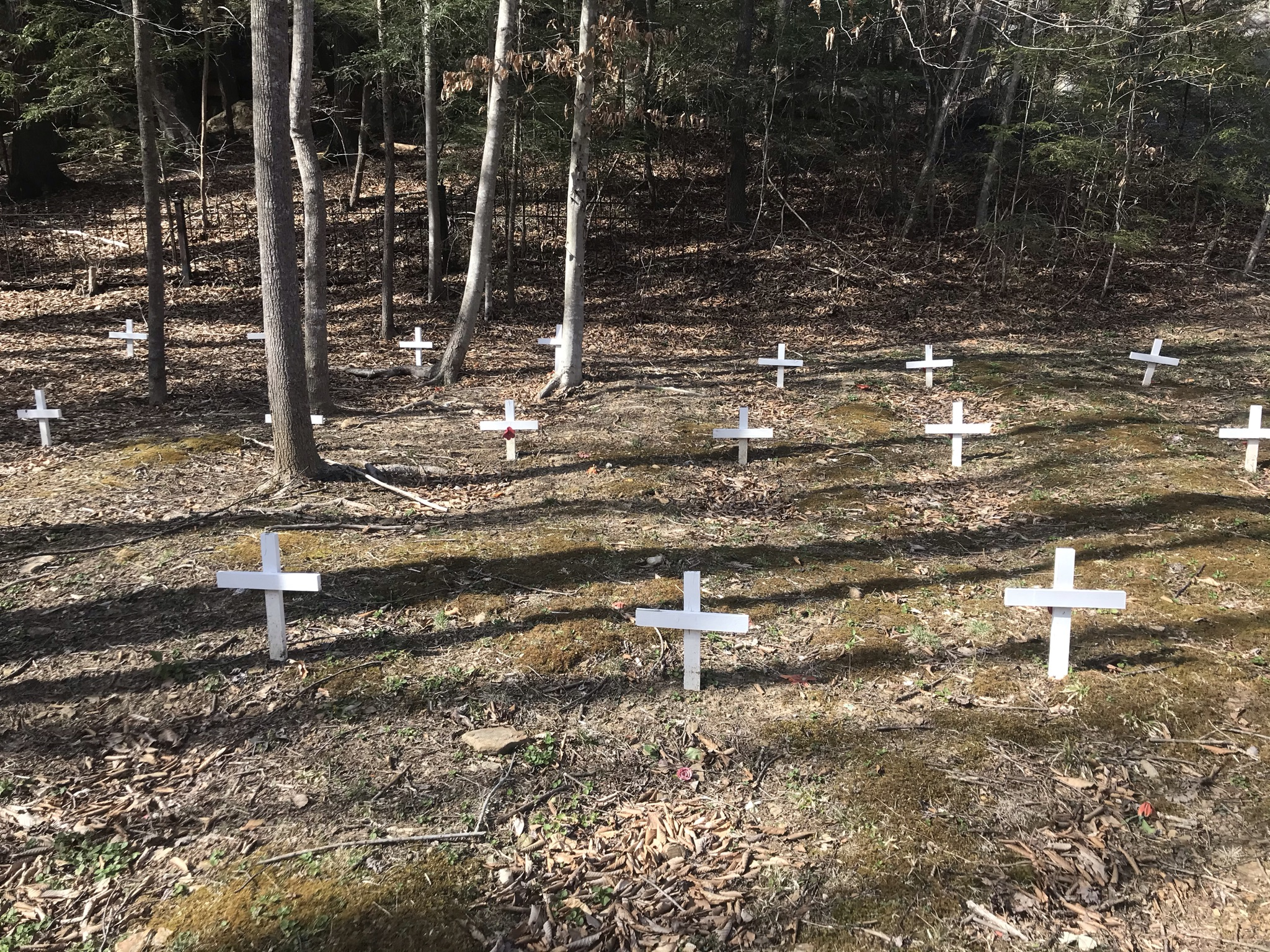
The Hawks Nest Tunnel disaster memorial grave site

Prior to the 1970s, respirator standards were under the purview of the US Bureau of Mines (USBM). An example of an early respirator standard, Type A, established in 1926, was intended to protect against mechanically generated dusts produced in mines. These standards were intended to obviate miner deaths, noted to have reached 3,243 by 1907. Prior to the Hawks Nest Tunnel disaster, these standards were merely advisory, as the USBM had no enforcement power at the time. After the disaster, an explicit approval program was established in 1934, along with the introduction of combination Type A/B/C respirator ratings, corresponding to Dusts/Fumes/Mists respectively, with Type D blocking all three, under 30 CFR 14 Schedule 21.

The Federal Coal Mine Health and Safety Act establishing MESA (later MSHA), the Occupational Safety and Health Act of 1970, establishing NIOSH, as well as other regulations established around the time, reshuffled regulatory authority for respirators, and moved regulations from Part 14 to Part 11 by 1972,^{[N2]} but nonetheless continued the use of USBM-era regulations.

In the 1970s, the successor to the United States Bureau of Mines and NIOSH developed standards for single-use respirators, and the first single-use respirator was developed by 3M and approved in 1972. 3M used a melt blowing process that it had developed decades prior and used in products such as ready-made ribbon bows and bra cups; its use in a wide array of products had been pioneered by designer Sara Little Turnbull.

==== 1990s ====
In July 1995, in response to respirators exhibiting "low initial efficiency levels", new 42 CFR 84 standards, including the N95 standard, were enforced under a three-year transition period,^{[C4]} ending in July 1998.^{[N2]} The standard for N95 respirators includes, but is not limited to, a filtration of at least 95% under a 0.3 micrometer^{[C4]} 200 milligram test load of sodium chloride. Standards and specifications are also subject to change.^{[N2]}

Once 42 CFR 84 was in effect, MSHA, under a proposed rule change to 30 CFR 11, 70, and 71, would withdraw from the approval process of rated respirators (outside of respirators used for mining).^{[C1]}

Respirator guidelines for TB were created by NIOSH as a result of the HIV/AIDS-induced outbreak in US hospitals
(Read on Wikisource)

N95 standard development is documented in the Federal Register, and the Code of Federal Regulations

NIOSH video on TB respirator usage, from the year 2000

=== 21st century ===
==== Continuing mesothelioma litigation ====
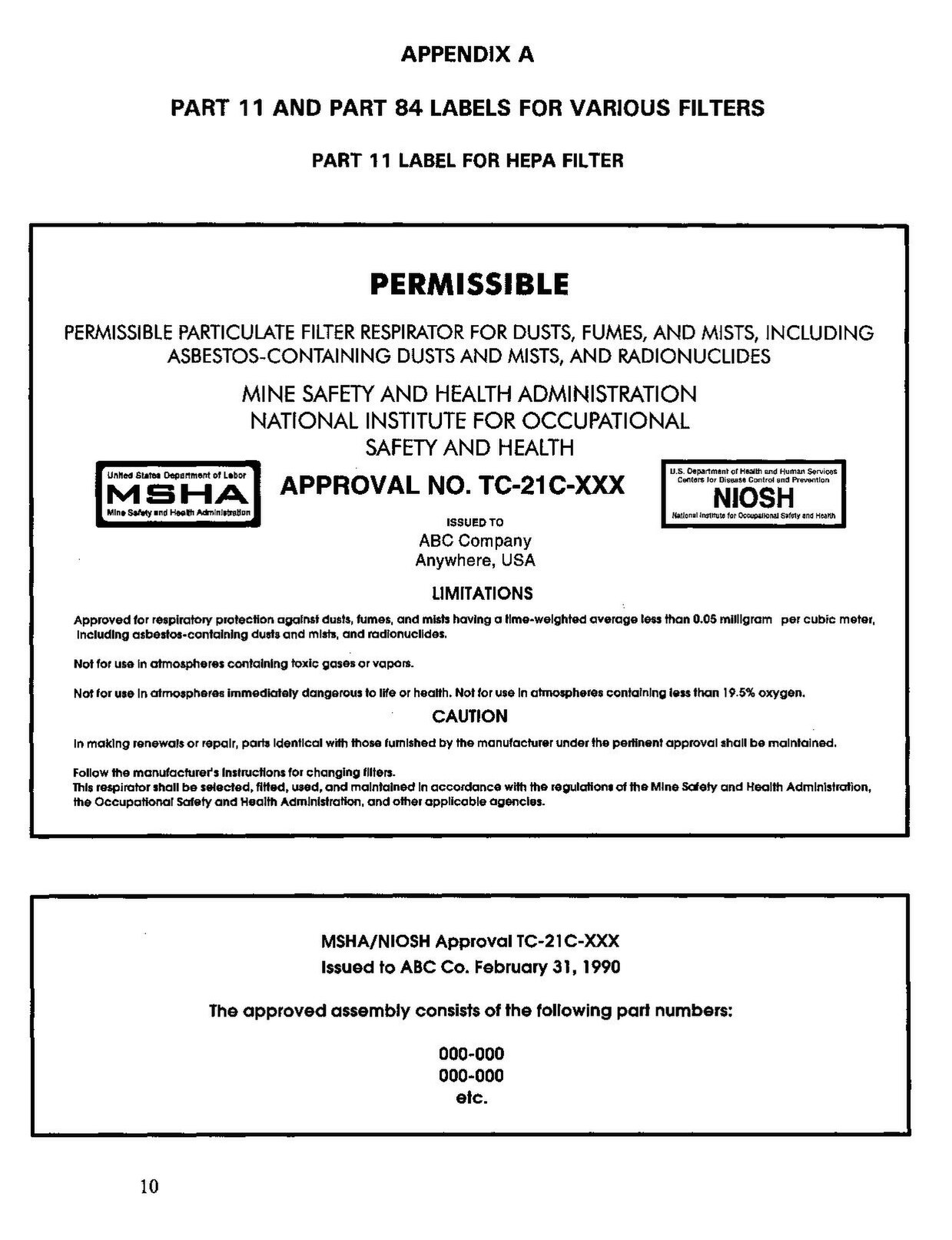
30 CFR 11 label, with asbestos approval

NIOSH certifies B Readers, people qualified to testify or provide evidence in mesothelioma personal injury lawsuits, in addition to regulating respirators. However, since 2000, the increasing scope of claims related to mesothelioma started to include respirator manufacturers to the tune of 325,000 cases, despite the primary use of respirators being to prevent asbestos and silica-related diseases. Most of these cases were not successful, or reached settlements of around $1000 per litigant, well below the cost of mesothelioma treatment.

One reason is due to the fact that respirator manufacturers are not allowed to modify a respirator once it is certified by NIOSH. In one case, a jury ruled against 3M for a respirator that was initially approved for asbestos, but was quickly disapproved once OSHA permissible exposure limits for asbestos changed. Combined with testimony that the plaintiff rarely wore a respirator around asbestos, the lack of evidence, and the limitation of liability from static NIOSH approval, the case was overturned.

Nonetheless, the costs of litigation reduced the margins for respirators, which was blamed for supply shortages for N95 respirators for anticipated pandemics, like avian influenza, during the 2000s.

==== 2020 ====
China normally makes 10 million masks per day, about half of the world production. During the COVID-19 pandemic, 2,500 factories were converted to produce 116 million daily.

During the COVID-19 pandemic, people in the United States, and in a lot of countries in the world, were urged to make their own cloth masks due to the widespread shortage of commercial masks.

==== 2024 ====
The CDC recommends farm workers wear PPE, including N95 or better respirators, when working with farm animals potentially infected with H5N1. However, outbreaks of H5N1 have continued among dairy workers, likely due to workers' fear of retaliation by their employers, and reluctance by employers and state officials to allow CDC investigators into dairy farms.

== Summary of modern respirators ==
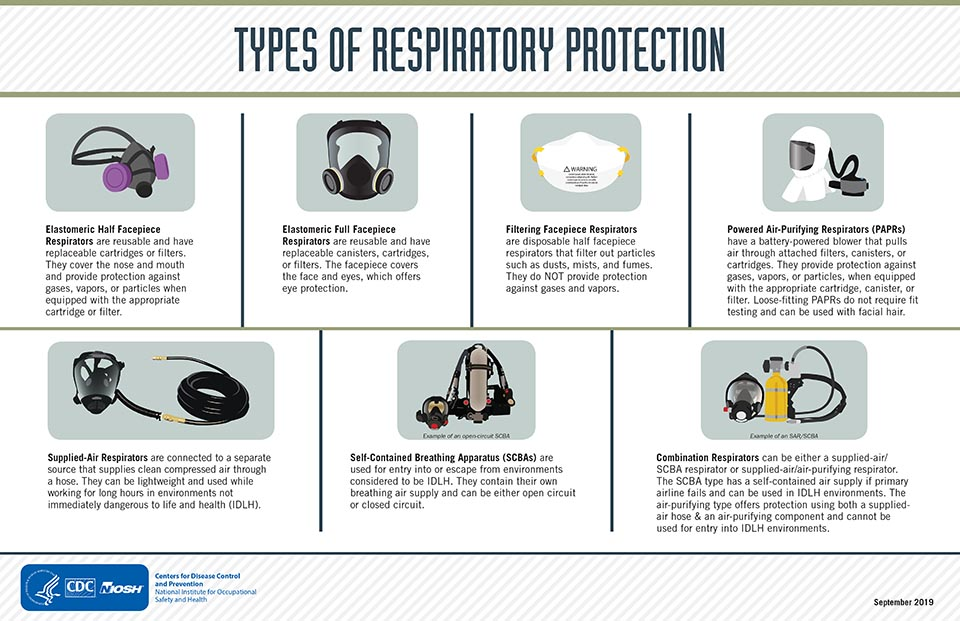
Types of respirators by physical form.

All respirators have some type of facepiece held to the wearer's head with straps, a cloth harness, or some other method. Facepieces come in many different styles and sizes to accommodate all types of face shapes.

A full facepiece covers the mouth, nose and eyes and if sealed, is sealed round the perimeter of the face. Unsealed versions may be used when air is supplied at a rate which prevents ambient gas from reaching the nose or mouth during inhalation.

Respirators can have half-face forms that cover the bottom half of the face including the nose and mouth, and full-face forms that cover the entire face. Half-face respirators are only effective in environments where the contaminants are not toxic to the eyes or facial area.

An escape respirator may have no component that would normally be described as a mask, and may use a bite-grip mouthpiece and nose clip instead. Alternatively, an escape respirator could be a time-limited self-contained breathing apparatus.

For hazardous environments, like confined spaces, atmosphere-supplying respirators, like SCBAs, should be used.

A wide range of industries use respirators including healthcare & pharmaceuticals, defense & public safety services (defense, firefighting & law enforcement), oil and gas industries, manufacturing (automotive, chemical, metal fabrication, food and beverage, wood working, paper and pulp), mining, construction, agriculture and forestry, cement production, power generation, painting, shipbuilding, and the textile industry.

Respirators require user training in order to provide proper protection.

== Use ==
=== User seal check ===
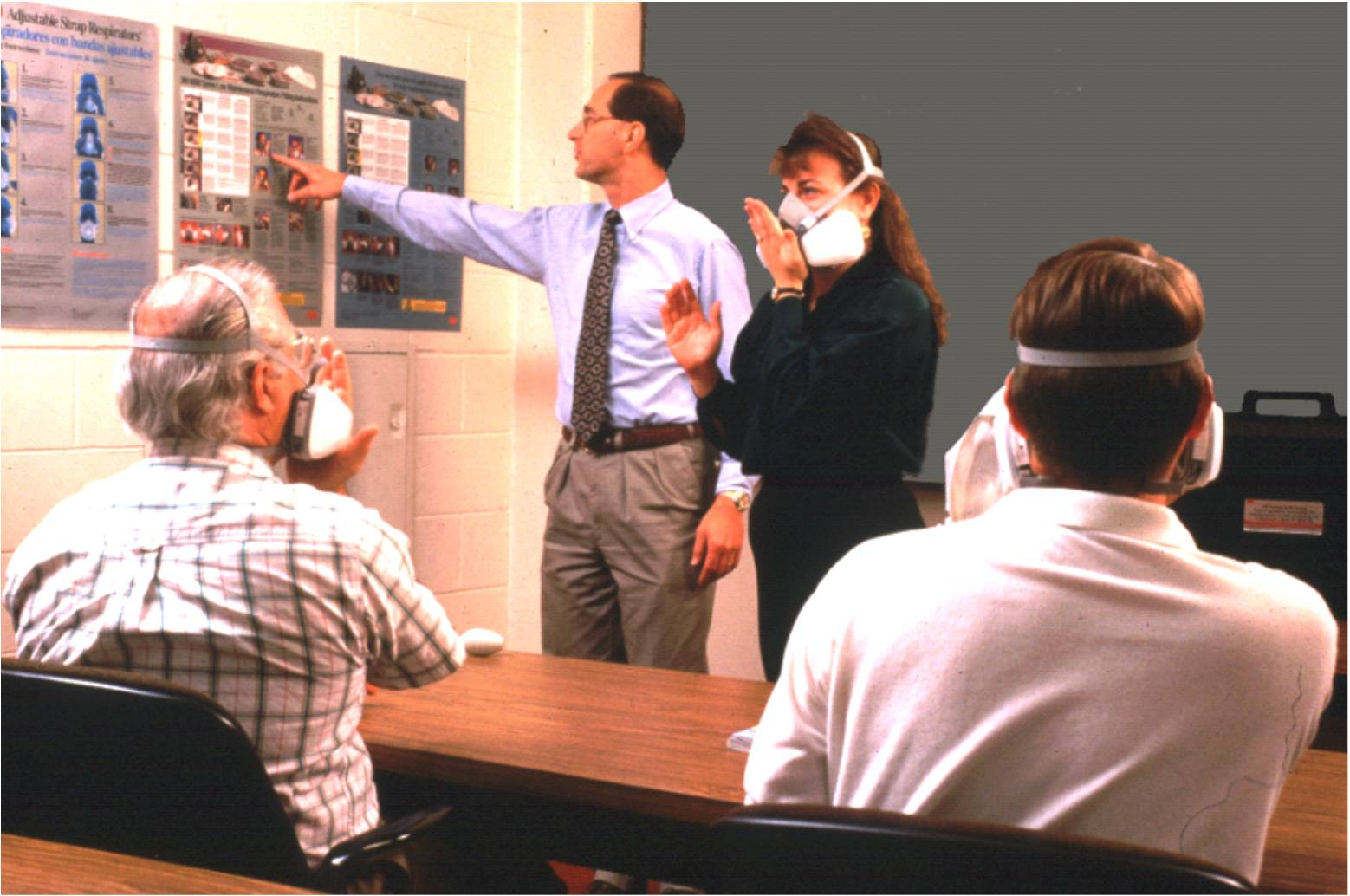
Multiple people doing positive pressure user seal checks.

Each time a wearer dons a respirator, they must perform a seal check to be sure that they have an airtight seal to the face so that air does not leak around the edges of the respirator. (PAPR respirators may not require this because they don't necessarily seal to the face.) This check is different from the periodic fit test that is performed using testing equipment. Filtering facepiece respirators are typically checked by cupping the hands over the facepiece while exhaling (positive pressure check) or inhaling (negative pressure check) and observing any air leakage around the facepiece. Elastomeric respirators are checked in a similar manner, except the wearer blocks the airways through the inlet valves (negative pressure check) or exhalation valves (positive pressure check) while observing the flexing of the respirator or air leakage. Manufacturers have different methods for performing seal checks and wearers should consult the specific instructions for the model of respirator they are wearing. Some models of respirators or filter cartridges have special buttons or other mechanisms built into them to facilitate seal checks.

=== Fit testing ===
A respirator fit test checks if a respirator properly fits the face of a user. A fitted respirator must be able to separate a user's respiratory system from ambient air.

The test involves tightly pressing the mask against the face (without gaps) to ensure an efficient seal on the mask perimeter. Protection depends on an airtight seal, making testing necessary before entering contaminated air. Mask size and shape correctly fitted to the user's face provides better protection in hazardous environments. Facial hair, such as beards, can interfere with proper fit.

=== Contrast with surgical mask ===
An infographic on the difference between surgical masks and N95 respirators

A surgical mask is a loosely-placed, unsealed barrier, meant to stop droplets, and other liquid-borne particles from the mouth and nose that may contain pathogens.

A surgical mask may not block all particles, due to the lack of fit between the surface of the face mask and the face. The filtration efficiency of a surgical mask ranges between 10% and 90% for any given manufacturer, when measured using tests required for NIOSH certification. A study found that 80–100% of subjects failed an OSHA-accepted qualitative fit test, and a quantitative test showed between 12 and 25% leakage.

A CDC study found that in public indoor settings, consistently wearing a respirator was linked to an 83% lower risk of testing positive for COVID-19, as compared to a 66% reduction when using surgical masks, and 56% for cloth.

==== Surgical N95 ====
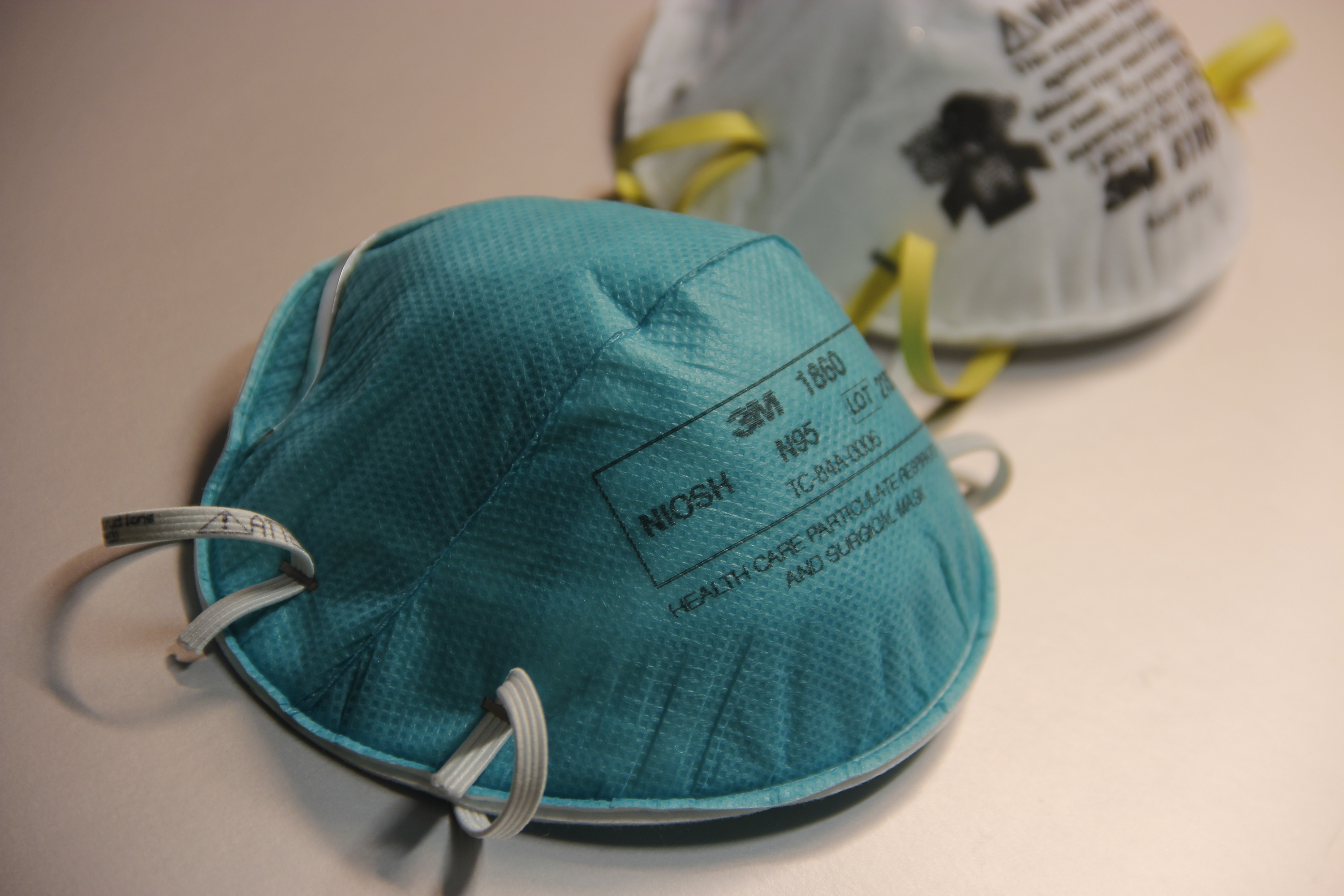
A 3M 1860 surgical N95, with a non-surgical 3M 8210 in the background

Respirators used in healthcare are traditionally a specific variant called a surgical respirator, which is both approved by NIOSH as a respirator and cleared by the Food and Drug Administration as a medical device similar to a surgical mask. These may also be labeled "Surgical N95", "medical respirators", or "healthcare respirators". The difference lies in the extra fluid-resistant layer outside, typically colored blue. In addition to 42 CFR 84, surgical N95s are regulated under FDA regulation 21 CFR 878.4040.

In the United States, the Occupational Safety and Health Administration (OSHA) requires healthcare workers who are expected to perform patient activities with those suspected or confirmed to be infected with COVID-19 to wear respiratory protection, such as an N95 respirator. The CDC recommends the use of respirators with at least N95 certification to protect the wearer from inhalation of infectious particles including Mycobacterium tuberculosis, avian influenza, severe acute respiratory syndrome (SARS), pandemic influenza, and Ebola.

== Respirator selection ==
Air-purifying respirators are respirators that draw in the surrounding air and purify it before it is breathed (unlike air-supplying respirators, which are sealed systems, with no air intake, like those used underwater). Air-purifying respirators filter particulates, gases, and vapors from the air, and may be negative-pressure respirators driven by the wearer's inhalation and exhalation, or positive-pressure units such as powered air-purifying respirators (PAPRs).

According to the NIOSH Respirator Selection Logic, air-purifying respirators are recommended for concentrations of hazardous particulates or gases that are greater than the relevant occupational exposure limit but less than the immediately dangerous to life or health level and the manufacturer's maximum use concentration, subject to the respirator having a sufficient assigned protection factor. For substances hazardous to the eyes, a respirator equipped with a full facepiece, helmet, or hood is recommended. Air-purifying respirators are not effective during firefighting, in oxygen-deficient atmosphere, or in an unknown atmosphere; in these situations a self-contained breathing apparatus is recommended instead.

== Types of filtration ==
=== Mechanical filter ===
Main Article: Mechanical filter respirator (and regulatory ratings)

A video describing N95 certification testing

Mechanical filters remove contaminants from air in several ways: interception when particles following a line of flow in the airstream come within one radius of a fiber and adhere to it; impaction, when larger particles unable to follow the curving contours of the airstream are forced to embed in one of the fibers directly; this increases with diminishing fiber separation and higher air flow velocity; by diffusion, where gas molecules collide with the smallest particles, especially those below 100 nm in diameter, which are thereby impeded and delayed in their path through the filter, increasing the probability that particles will be stopped by either of the previous two mechanisms; and by using an electrostatic charge that attracts and holds particles on the filter surface.

There are many different filtration standards that vary by jurisdiction. In the United States, the National Institute for Occupational Safety and Health defines the categories of particulate filters according to their NIOSH air filtration rating. The most common of these are the N95 respirator, which filters at least 95% of airborne particles but is not resistant to oil.

Other categories filter 99% or 99.97% of particles, or have varying degrees of resistance to oil.

In the European Union, European standard EN 143 defines the 'P' classes of particle filters that can be attached to a face mask, while European standard EN 149 defines classes of "filtering half masks" or "filtering facepieces", usually called FFP masks.

According to 3M, the filtering media in respirators made according to the following standards are similar to U.S. N95 or European FFP2 respirators, however, the construction of the respirators themselves, such as providing a proper seal to the face, varies considerably. (For example, US NIOSH-approved respirators never include earloops because they don't provide enough support to establish a reliable, airtight seal.) Standards for respirator filtration the Chinese KN95, Australian / New Zealand P2, Korean 1st Class also referred to as KF94, and Japanese DS.

=== Canister or chemical cartridge ===
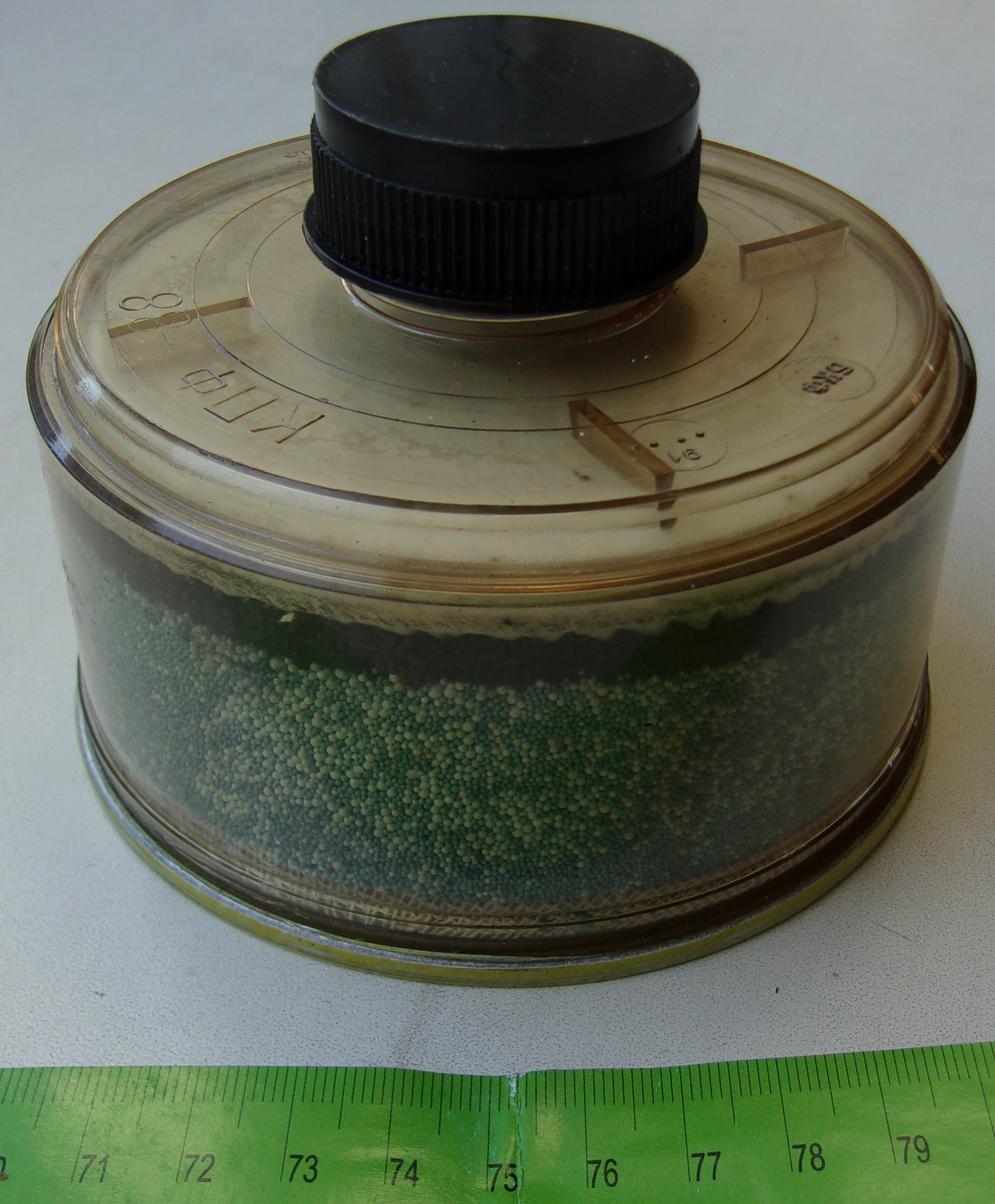
Combined gas and particulate gas mask canister, type BKF (БКФ), for protection against acid gases. It has a transparent body and a special sorbent that changes color upon saturation. This color change may be used for timely replacement of respirators' filters (like an end-of-service-life indicator, ESLI).

Chemical cartridges and gas mask canisters remove gases, volatile organic compounds (VOCs), and other vapors from breathing air by adsorption, absorption, or chemisorption. A typical organic vapor respirator cartridge is a metal or plastic case containing from 25 to 40 grams of sorption media such as activated charcoal or certain resins. The service life of the cartridge varies based, among other variables, on the carbon weight and molecular weight of the vapor and the cartridge media, the concentration of vapor in the atmosphere, the relative humidity of the atmosphere, and the breathing rate of the respirator wearer. When filter cartridges become saturated or particulate accumulation within them begins to restrict air flow, they must be changed.

If the concentration of harmful gases is immediately dangerous to life or health, in workplaces covered by the Occupational Safety and Health Act the US Occupational Safety and Health Administration specifies the use of air-supplied respirators except when intended solely for escape during emergencies. NIOSH also discourages their use under such conditions.

Under 42 CFR 84, chemical cartridges and gas mask canisters are defined separately. Use of the TC-14G canister schedule or the TC-23C chemical cartridge schedule for a given respirator depends on whether "acid gas" is a designated contaminant, which is designated for gas mask canisters only, or if the manufacturer is obligated to list all designated contaminants supported by a given chemical cartridge.^{[ND2]}

== Air-purifying respirators ==
=== Filtering facepiece ===
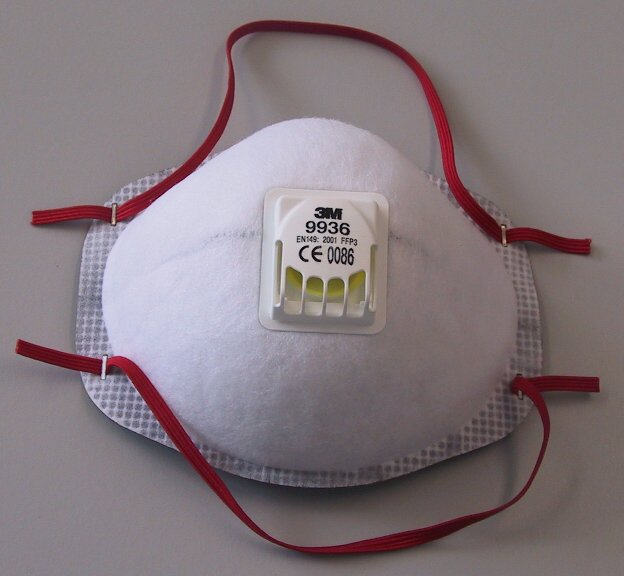
Filtering facepiece half mask with exhalation valve (class: FFP3)

Filtering facepiece respirators consist mainly of the mechanical filtration medium itself, and are discarded when they become unusable due to damage, dirt, or excessive breathing resistance. Filtering facepieces are typically simple, light, single-piece, half-face masks and employ the first three mechanical filter mechanisms in the list above to remove particulates from the air stream. The most common of these is the white, disposable standard N95 variety; another type is the Surgical N95 mask. It is discarded after single use or some extended period depending on the contaminant. NIOSH recommends not reusing filtering facepieces in biosafety level 2 or 3 laboratories.

=== Elastomeric ===
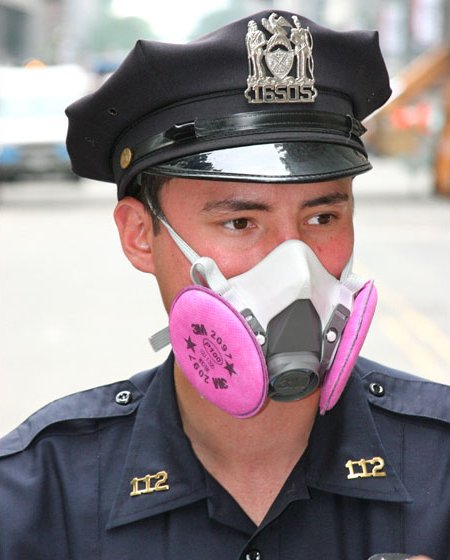
New York Police Department officer wearing a 3M elastomeric respirator with P100-standard particulate filters in the aftermath of the 2007 New York City steam explosion

Elastomeric respirators, also called reusable air-purifying respirators, seal to the face with elastomeric material, which may be a natural or synthetic rubber. They are generally reusable. Full-face versions of elastomeric respirators seal better and protect the eyes.

Elastomeric respirators consist of a reusable mask that seals to the face, with exchangeable filters. Elastomeric respirators can be used with chemical cartridge filters that remove gases, mechanical filters that retain particulate matter, or both. As particulate filters, they are comparable (or, due to the quality and error-tolerance of the elastomeric seal, possibly superior) to filtering facepiece respirators such as most disposable N95 respirators and FFP masks.

=== Powered air-purifying respirators ===
A powered air-purifying respirator (PAPR) is a type of respirator used to safeguard workers against contaminated air. PAPRs consist of a headgear-and-fan assembly that takes ambient air contaminated with one or more type of pollutant or pathogen, actively removes (filters) a sufficient proportion of these hazards, and then delivers the clean air to the user's face or mouth and nose. They have a higher assigned protection factor than filtering facepiece respirators such as N95 masks. PAPRs are sometimes called positive-pressure masks, blower units, or just blowers.

== Atmosphere-supplying respirators ==
These respirators do not purify the ambient air, but supply breathing gas from another source. The three types are the self contained breathing apparatus, in which a compressed air cylinder is worn by the wearer; the supplied air respirators, where a hose supplies air from a stationary source; and combination supplied-air respirators, with an emergency backup tank.

=== Self-contained breathing apparatus ===
A self-contained breathing apparatus (SCBA) is a respirator worn to provide an autonomous supply of breathable gas in an atmosphere that is immediately dangerous to life or health from a gas cylinder. They are typically used in firefighting and industry. The term self-contained means that the SCBA is not dependent on a remote supply of breathing gas (e.g., through a long hose). They are sometimes called industrial breathing sets. Some types are also referred to as a compressed air breathing apparatus (CABA) or simply breathing apparatus. Unofficial names include air pack, air tank, oxygen cylinder or simply pack, terms used mostly in firefighting. If designed for use under water, it is also known as a scuba set (self-contained underwater breathing apparatus).

An open circuit SCBA typically has three main components: a high-pressure gas storage cylinder, (e.g., 2,216 to 5,500 psi (15,280 to 37,920 kPa), about 150 to 374 atmospheres), a pressure regulator, and a respiratory interface, which may be a mouthpiece, half mask or full-face mask, assembled and mounted on a framed carrying harness.

A self-contained breathing apparatus may be open-circuit or closed-circuit, and open circuit units may be demand supplied or continuous-flow.

=== Supplied air respirator ===
A supplied-air respirator (SAR) or air-line respirator is a breathing apparatus used in places where the ambient air may not be safe to breathe. It uses an air hose to supply air from outside the danger zone. It is similar to a self-contained breathing apparatus (SCBA), except that SCBA users carry their air with them in high pressure cylinders, while SAR users get it from a remote stationary air supply connected to them by a hose. They may be equipped with a backup air tank in case the air-line gets cut.

== Escape respirators ==
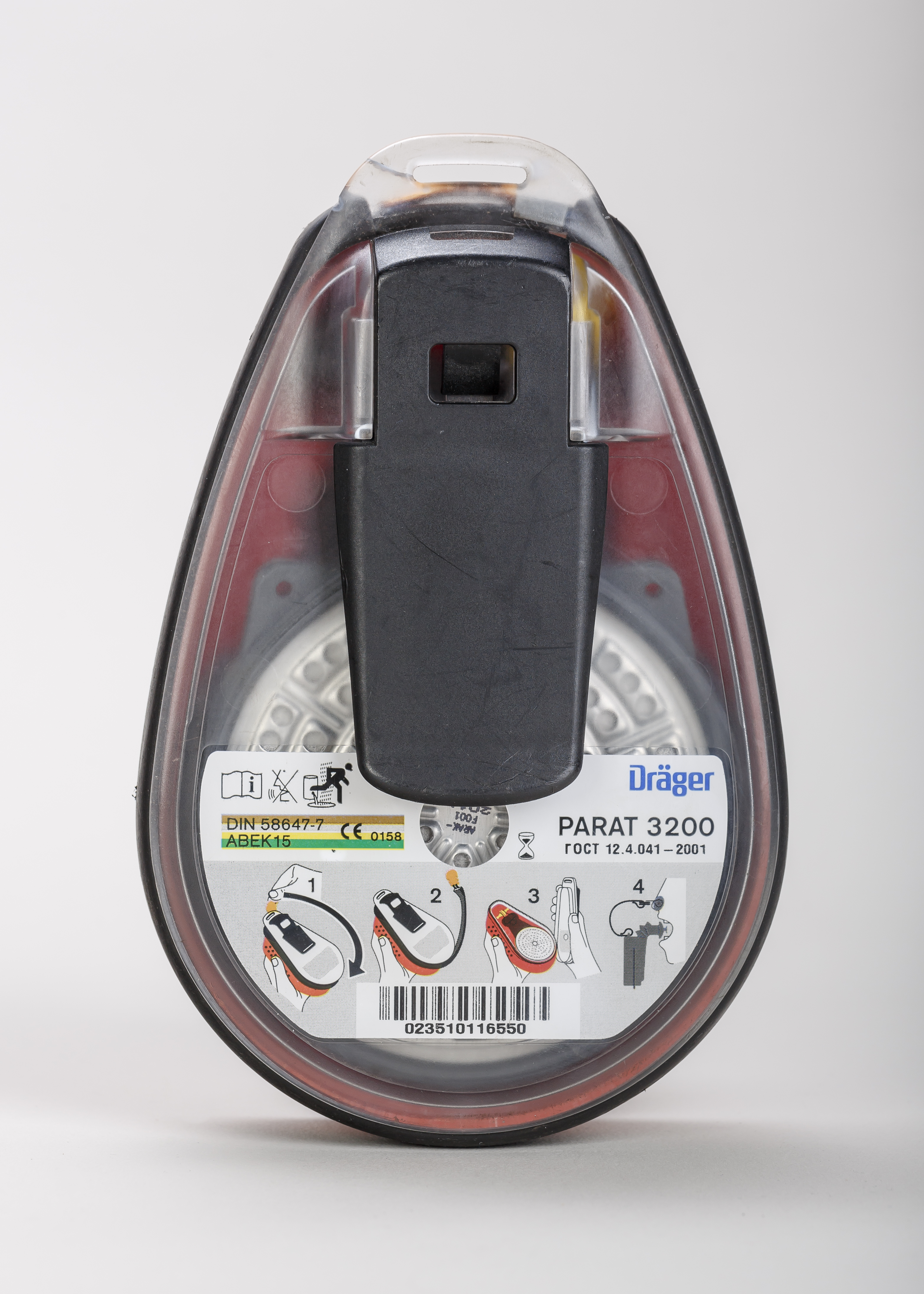
A simple Dräger escape respirator. This model has no hood, and instead comes with noseclips to ensure the wearer breathes only through the filter.

=== Smoke hood ===
A smoke hood, also called an Air-Purifying Respiratory Protective Smoke Escape Device (RPED), is a hood wherein a transparent airtight bag seals around the head of the wearer while an air filter held in the mouth connects to the outside atmosphere and is used to breathe. Smoke hoods are a class of emergency breathing apparatus intended to protect victims of fire from the effects of smoke inhalation. A smoke hood is a predecessor to the gas mask. The first modern smoke hood design was by Garrett Morgan and patented in 1912.

=== Self-contained breathing apparatus ===
==== Continuous-flow ====
Escape SCBAs, also known as ESCBAs, are intended for escape from IDLH situations only, and when fitted with hoods are operated in continuous flow mode. They are usually limited to 3–10 minutes endurance.

==== Self-rescue device ====
A self-contained self-rescue device, SCSR, self-contained self-rescuer, or air pack is a type of closed-circuit SCBA with a portable oxygen source for providing breathable air when the surrounding atmosphere lacks oxygen or is contaminated with toxic gases, e.g. carbon monoxide.

Self-rescuers are intended for use in environments such as coal mines where there is a risk of fire or explosion, and in a location where no external rescue may be available for some time – the wearer must make their own way to safety, or to some pre-equipped underground refuge. The main hazard here is from large quantities of carbon monoxide or whitedamp, often produced by an explosion of firedamp. In some industries, the hazard may be from anoxic asphyxia, or a lack of oxygen, rather than poisoning by something toxic.

Self-rescuers are small, lightweight belt or harness-worn devices, enclosed in a rugged metal case. They are designed to have a long service life of around 10 years (longer for shelf storage) and to be worn every day by each miner. Once used, they have a working life of a few hours and are discarded after opening.

== Issues ==
=== Under 30 CFR 11 ===
In 1992, NIOSH published a draft report on the effectiveness of respirator regulations under the then-current 30 CFR 11. Particulate respirators back then were mainly classified as either DM, DFM, or HEPA.

==== Respirator risk modelling ====
Assigned protection factors (APF) are predicated on the assumption that users are trained in the use of their respirators, and that 100% of users exceed the APF. This "simulated workplace protection factor" (SWPF) was said to be problematic:

By inference, these data are equally at odds with the protection factors established by OSHA for various types of respirator, which were based on QNFT [quantitative fit testing] data obtained by the Los Alamos National Laboratory in the 1970s. Until recently, the SWPFs gathered during QNFT were more or less assumed to translate directly into the protection afforded by a particular respirator, or class of respirators, while worn in the workplace.

Apparently this is now a questionable assumption which has thrown the entire concept of fit testing into doubt.

The ideal assumption of all respirator users exceeding the APF is termed the zero control failure rate by NIOSH. The term control failure rate here refers to the number of respirator users, per 100 users, that fail to reach the APF. The risk of user error affecting the failure rate, and the studies quantifying it, was, according to NIOSH, akin to the study of contraception failure rates.

This is despite there being a "reasonable expectation, of both purchasers and users, [that] none of the users will receive less protection than the class APF (when the masks are properly selected, fit tested by the employer, and properly worn by the users)". NIOSH expands on the methods for measuring this error in Chapter 7 of the draft report.

==== Qualitative fit testing ====
Qualitative fit testing with isoamyl acetate, irritant smoke, and saccharin were proposed as alternatives to quantitative fit testing in the 1980s, but doubts were raised as to its efficacy.

With regards to the effectiveness of fit testing in general, others have said:

First of all, it is unfortunate that fit testing results apparently cannot be used as a reliable indication of respirator performance in the workplace. Life would be simpler if the converse were to continue to be true...

In my opinion, we are left with respirator fit testing, whether qualitative or quantitative, playing the role as a means of obtaining the best possible fit of a given respirator on a given person at a given time. We should not make any representation as to the ultimate efficiency in the workplace.

==== Exercise protocols ====
With regards to fit test protocols, it was noted by NIOSH that "time pressures" resulted in the exclusion of intense exercises meant to simulate workplace use:

Part of the original test procedure called for test subjects to be stressed by treadmill, while undergoing a quantitative respirator leak evaluation. The purpose of this stressing was to simulate actual workplace use of the respirators. We accordingly abandoned the "stress" portion of the exercises, and substituted a period to be spent in a hot humid chamber, to work up a sweat, as a substitute for physical activity.

Neither exercise was included in the OSHA fit test protocols. Put another way, it has been said:

The exercise time limits are very short. The required exercises are sedentary and do not replicate movements of workers that may occur in workplaces.

==== Noncompliance with regulation ====
In spite of the requirement to fit test by OSHA, the following observations of noncompliance with respirator regulations were made by NIOSH and OSHA:

- Almost 80% of negative-pressure respirator wearers were not receiving fit testing.
- Over 70% of 123,000 manufacturing plants did not perform exposure-level monitoring, when selecting respirators to use in the plants.
- Noncompliance increased to almost 90% for the smallest plants.
- 75% of manufacturing plants did not have a written program.
- 56% of manufacturing plants did not have a professional respirator-program administrator (i.e., qualified individual supervising the program).
- Almost 50% of wearers in manufacturing plants did not receive an annual examination by a physician.
- Almost 50% of wearers in manufacturing plants did not receive respirator-use training.
- 80% of wearers in manufacturing plants did not have access to more than one facial-size mask, even though nearly all reusable masks were available in at least three sizes.

These noncompliance errors make up what NIOSH calls the program protection factor:

...NIOSH has concluded that all respirator workplace studies reported in the 1980s and early 1990s are respirator-performance studies, not respirator program evaluation studies. That is, they evaluate workplace protection factors, not program protection factors.

WPF studies frequently are conducted primarily to demonstrate "adequate protection" from a particular make and model respirator. Thus, in effect, WPF studies generally are designed and conducted to measure only respirator performance in the most favorable light possible. This is done to avoid reducing or "biasing" (i.e., systematically distorting) the observed respirator protection resulting from poorly-performed or inadequately-performed respirator program elements that are typically found in actual programs. A major objective in respirator-performance (WPF) studies is to minimize the effects of human errors, even though these errors may typically occur in actual workplace use of respirators...

==== Adherence to the regulatory minimum ====
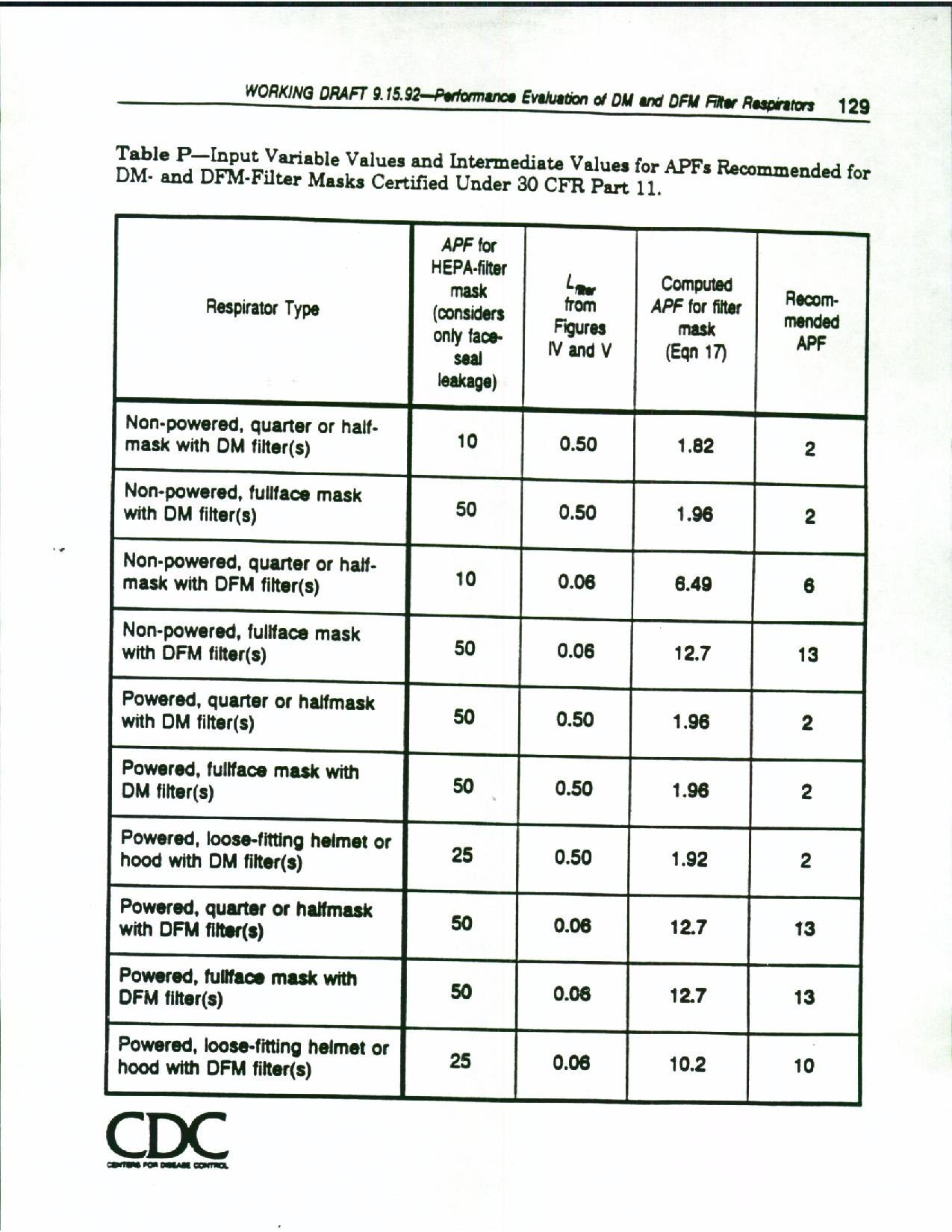
Final Part 11 APFs proposed by NIOSH for air-purifying respirators, with DM respirator APFs lowered to 2.

APFs may be based on the filtration performance from one or two manufacturers that barely pass the regulation. When the DM and DFM respirator filter standards at the time were found to have an unacceptably high filter leakage, NIOSH proposed lowering the APF for DM respirators from 10 to 2. On this scale, 1 is a completely ineffective respirator. Some respirator manufacturers, like 3M, complained that DM and DFM respirators with superior filtration, that would normally receive an APF well above 2, were being "held hostage" by poorly-performing respirators. While NIOSH acknowledged the predicament poorly-performing respirators were having on superior respirators in the same class, they concluded that the APFs, for respirator classes like DFM halfmask respirators, should be lowered to at least 6, despite APFs of 6 through 10 being allowed previously for DFM halfmasks.

ANSI suggested additional contaminant monitoring by employers to allow for the use of DM and DFM respirators, when the mass median aerodynamic diameter of dusts in contaminated workplaces is such that DM and DFM respirators could work. However, NIOSH pointed out that the poor adherence to OSHA regulations on exposure-level monitoring by employers, as well as lack of expertise in interpreting the collected data, would likely result in more workers being put at risk. In addition, NIOSH pointed out that the ANSI recommendations would effectively mandate the use of expensive Part 11 HEPA filters under Part 11 regulations, due to lack of adherence to exposure-level monitoring rules.

=== Hierarchy of Controls point of view under 42 CFR 84 ===
Placing an overemphasis on respirator usage can neglect other, more effective ways of remedying risk, but PPE may still be necessary under certain conditions (for example, during a TB outbreak)

The Hierarchy of Controls, noted as part of the Prevention Through Design initiative started by NIOSH with other standards bodies, is a set of guidelines emphasizing building in safety during design, as opposed to ad-hoc solutions like PPE, with multiple entities providing guidelines on how to implement safety during development outside of NIOSH-approved respirators. US Government entities currently and formerly involved in the regulation of respirators follow the Hierarchy of Controls, including OSHA and MSHA.

However, some HOC implementations, notably MSHA's, have been criticized for allowing mining operators to skirt engineering control noncompliance by requiring miners to wear respirators instead if the permissible exposure limit (PEL) is exceeded, without work stoppages, breaking the hierarchy of engineering controls. Another concern was fraud related to the inability to scrutinize engineering controls, unlike NIOSH-approved respirators, like the N95, which can be fit tested by anyone, are subject to the scrutiny of NIOSH, and are trademarked and protected under US federal law. NIOSH also noted, in a 2002 video about TB respirator use, that "engineering controls, like negative pressure isolation rooms may not control the TB hazard completely. The use of respirators is necessary".

==== Respirator non-compliance ====
With regards to people complying with requirements to wear respirators, various papers note high respirator non-compliance across industries, with a survey noting non-compliance was due in large part due to discomfort from temperature increases along the face, and a large amount of respondents also noting the social unacceptability of provided N95 respirators during the survey. For reasons like mishandling, ill-fitting respirators and lack of training, the Hierarchy of Controls dictates respirators be evaluated last while other controls exist and are working. Alternative controls like hazard elimination, administrative controls, and engineering controls like ventilation are less likely to fail due to user discomfort or error.

A U.S. Department of Labor study showed that in almost 40 thousand American enterprises, the requirements for the correct use of respirators are not always met. Experts note that in practice it is difficult to achieve elimination of occupational morbidity with the help of respirators:

It is well known how ineffective ... trying to compensate the harmful workplace conditions with ... the use of respirators by employees. Unfortunately, the only certain way of reducing the exceedance fraction to zero is to ensure that Co (note: Co - concentration of pollutants in the breathing zone) never exceeds the PEL value.

===== Beards =====
Beards can significantly affect the integrity of the respirator's face seal.

Certain types of facial hair can reduce fit to a significant degree. For this reason, there are facial hair guidelines for respirator users.

==== Counterfeiting, modification, and revocation of regulated respirators ====
Another disadvantage of respirators is that the onus is on the respirator user to determine if their respirator is counterfeit or has had its certification revoked. Customers and employers can inadvertently purchase non-OEM parts for a NIOSH-approved respirator which void the NIOSH approval and violate OSHA laws, in addition to potentially compromising the fit of the respirator.

Counterfeit respirator identification
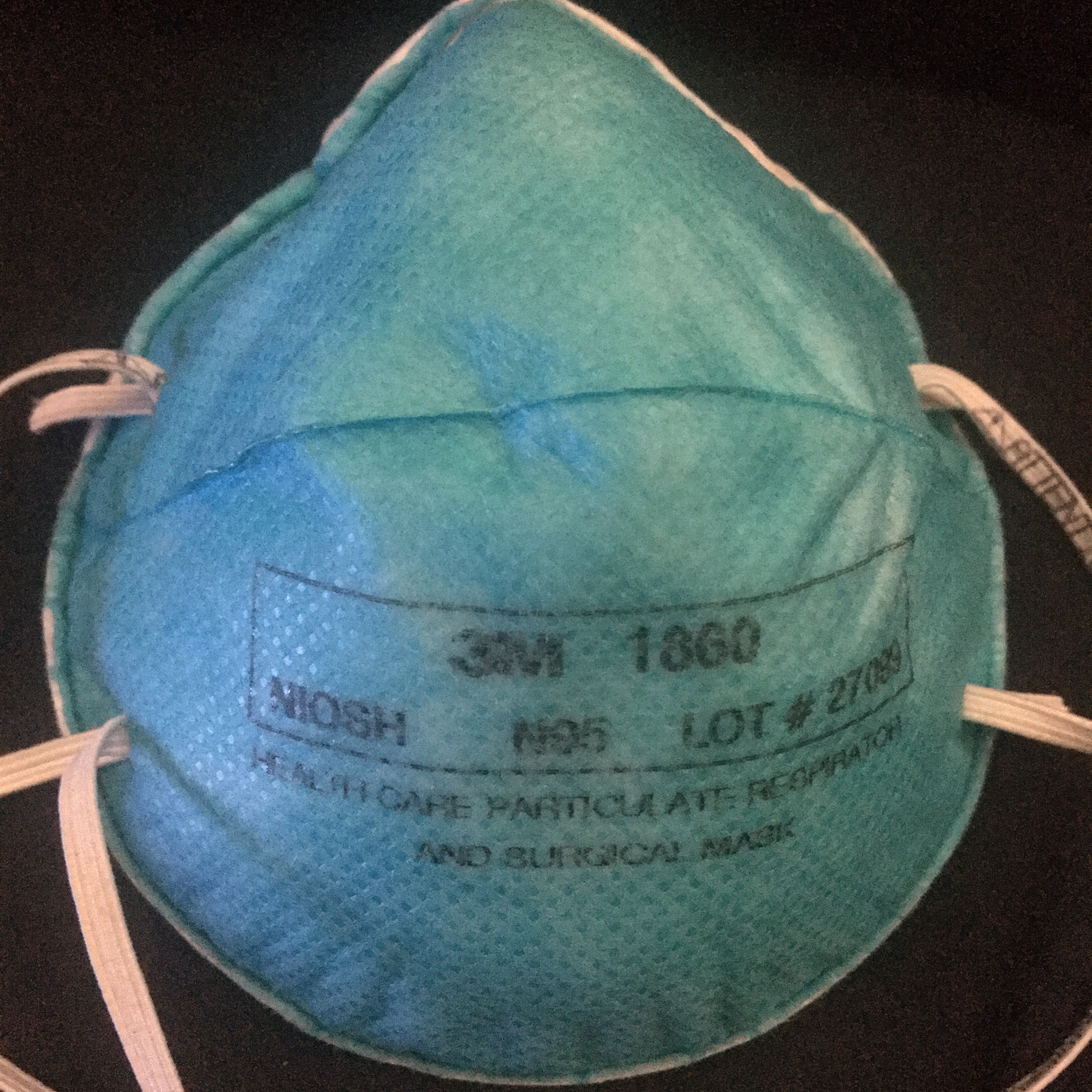
A counterfeit N95 respirator with no TC#

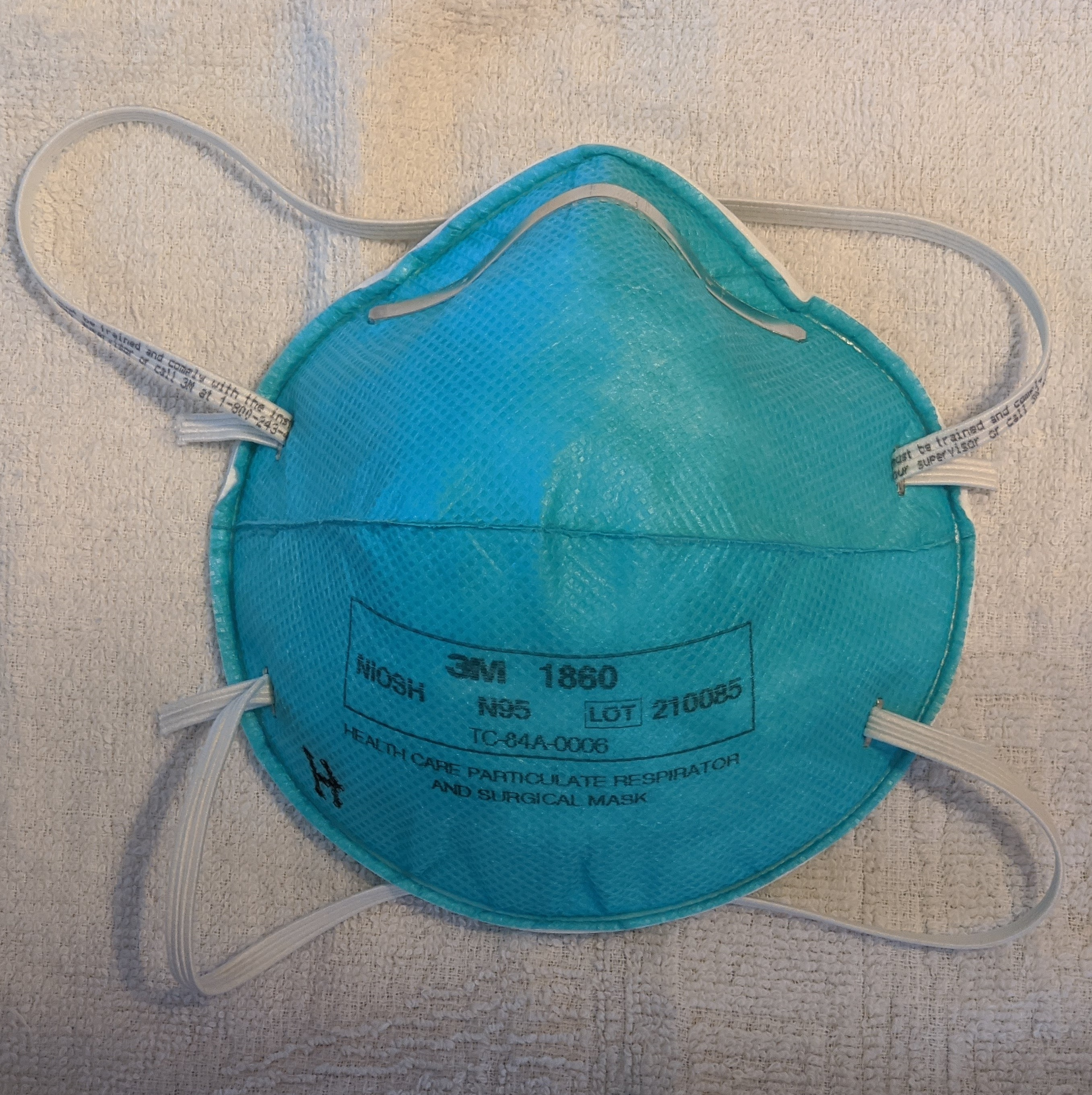
Compared to the official 3M

OSHA video on modified and counterfeit respirators

==== Issues with fit testing ====
If respirators must be used, under 29 CFR 1910.134, OSHA requires respirator users to conduct a respirator fit test, with a safety factor of 10 to offset lower fit during real world use. However, NIOSH notes the large amount of time required for fit testing has been a point of contention for employers.

Other opinions concern the change in performance of respirators in use compared to when fit testing, and compared to engineering control alternatives:

The very limited field tests of air-purifying respirator performance in the workplace show that respirators may perform far less well under actual use conditions than is indicated by laboratory fit factors. We are not yet able to predict the level of protection accurately; it will vary from person to person, and it may also vary from one use to the next for the same individual. In contrast, we can predict the effectiveness of engineering controls, and we can monitor their performance with commercially available state-of-the-art devices.

=== Issues with respirator design ===
Extended or off-label use of certain negative-pressure respirators, like a filtering facepiece respirator paired with a surgical mask, can result in higher levels of carbon dioxide from dead space and breathing resistance (pressure drop) which can impact functioning and sometimes can exceed the PEL. This effect was significantly reduced with powered air purifying respirators. In various surveys among healthcare workers, headaches, dermatitis and acne have been reported.

Complaints have been leveled at early LANL NIOSH fit test panels (which included primarily military personnel) as being unrepresentative of the broader American populace. However, later fit test panels, based on a NIOSH facial survey conducted in 2003, were able to reach 95% representation of working US population surveyed. Despite these developments, 42 CFR 84, the US regulation NIOSH follows for respirator approval, allows for respirators that don't follow the NIOSH fit test panel provided that: more than one facepiece size is provided, and no chemical cartridges are made available.

Additionally, respirator designs, sizing, and regulatory testing frameworks in the United States are oriented around adult workers rather than children or adolescents. A 2026 systematic review of 31 studies examining filtering facepiece respirator use among U.S. farm youth found that while respirators are physiologically tolerable for young people, poor fit and discomfort from adult-sized equipment remain major barriers to effective protection.

=== Issues with lack of regulation ===
Respirators designed to non-US standards may not be subject to as much or any scrutiny:

- In China, under GB2626-2019, which includes standards like KN95, there is no procedure for fit testing.

Some jurisdictions allow for respirator filtration ratings lower than 95%, respirators which are not rated to prevent respiratory infection, asbestos, or other dangerous occupational hazards. These respirators are sometimes known as dust masks for their almost exclusive approval only against dust nuisances:

- In Europe, regulation allows for dust masks under FFP1, where 20% inward leakage is allowed, with a minimum filtration efficiency of 80%.
- South Korea allows 20% filter leakage under KF80.

In the US, NIOSH noted that under standards predating the N95, 'Dust/Mist' rated respirators could not prevent the spread of TB.

== Regulation ==
The choice and use of respirators in developed countries is regulated by national legislation. To ensure that employers choose respirators correctly, and perform high-quality respiratory protection programs, various guides and textbooks have been developed:

Textbooks and guidelines for the selection and use of respirators
Country	Language	Year of publication	Pages	Institution (hyperlink to document)
US	English	1987	305	NIOSH
US	English	2005	32	NIOSH
US	English	1999	120	NIOSH
US	English	2017	48	Pesticide Educational Resources Collaborative (PERC)
US	English & Spanish	-	-	OSHA
US	English	2011	124	OSHA
US	English	2015	96	OSHA
US	English	2012	44	OSHA
US	English	2014	44	OSHA
US	English	2016	32	OSHA
US	English	2014	38	OSHA
US	English	2017	51	OSHA
US	English	2001	166	NRC
US	English	1986	173	NIOSH & EPA
Canada	French	2013, 2002	60	Institut de recherche Robert-Sauve en santé et en sécurité du travail (IRSST)
Canada	English	2015	-	Institut de recherche Robert-Sauve en sante et en securite du travai (IRSST)
Canada	French	2015	-	Institut de recherche Robert-Sauve en sante et en securite du travai (IRSST)
France	French	2017	68	Institut National de Recherche et de Sécurité (INRS)
Germany	German	2011	174	Spitzenverband der gewerblichen Berufsgenossenschaften und der Unfallversicherungsträger der öffentlichen Hand (DGUV)
UK	English	2013	59	The Health and Safety Executive (HSE)
UK	English	2016	29	The UK Nuclear Industry Good PracIndustry Radiological Protection Coordination Group (IRPCG)
Ireland	English	2010	19	The Health and Safety Authority (HSA)
New Zealand	English	1999	51	Occupational Safety and Health Service (OSHS)
Chile	Spanish	2009	40	Instituto de Salud Publica de Chile (ISPCH)
Spain	Spanish	-	16	INSST

For standard filter classes used in respirators, see Mechanical filter (respirator)#Filtration standards.

=== Voluntary respirator use ===
==== United States ====
When in an environment where no designated hazards are present, OSHA mandated respirator requirements are limited to Appendix D of 1910.134. Voluntary respirator users under Appendix D are only obligated to follow manufacturer instructions for maintenance, use, and warnings, and to keep track of the respirator. OSHA encourages the use of respirators, even if only voluntarily.^{[C5]}

OSHA advises voluntary respirator users receive a copy of 1910.134 Appendix D, as well as verify that the respirator used, be it powered-air purifying, self-contained, or facepiece-filtering, is not a potential health hazard.

== See also ==
- Dust mask – Pad held over the nose and mouth to protect against dust
- Face shield – Device used to protect the wearer's face from hazards
- Gas mask – Protection from inhaling airborne pollutants and toxic gases
- Health belief model – Psychological model for potentially detrimental attitudes and actions on their health
- Minimum efficiency reporting value – Measurement scale for the effectiveness of air filters
- Respirator assigned protection factors
  - Permissible exposure limit – Workplace environmental standard
- Personal protective equipment – Equipment designed to help protect an individual from hazards (PPE)
- Surgical mask – Mouth and nose cover against bacterial aerosols
- Workplace respirator testing – Testing of respirators in real life conditions
