= Lily Jeffreys =

New Zealand artist (1853–1885)

- Born: Elizabeth Georgiana Jeffreys; 16 January 1853; Dunedin, New Zealand
- Died: 18 July 1885 (aged 32); Brightwater, New Zealand
- Relatives: Julius Jeffreys (uncle)

Elizabeth Georgiana Jeffreys (16 January 1853 – 18 July 1885) was a New Zealand artist.

== Biography ==
Jeffreys was born in Dunedin on 16 January 1853, the daughter of Reverend Charles Jeffreys and Frances Hagell. Her sister, Frances McGoun (née Jeffreys) was also an artist, and her uncle, Julius Jeffreys, was a noted surgeon and medical pioneer.

Several of Jeffreys' drawings and watercolours of New Zealand landscapes are now in the Hocken collections at the University of Otago. Several are dated from 1865 to 1867 when Jeffreys was a teenager.

Jeffreys died on 18 July 1885 in Brightwater, Nelson, aged 32.
