= ILO Classification =

The ILO International Classification of Radiographs of Pneumoconioses is a system of classifying chest radiographs (X-rays) for persons with a (or, rarely, more than one) form of pneumoconiosis. The intent is to provide a standardized, uniform method of interpreting and describing abnormalities in chest x-rays that are thought to be caused by prolonged dust inhalation. In use, it provides a system for both epidemiological comparisons of many individuals exposed to dust and evaluation of an individual's potential disease relative to established standards.

== History ==
Since 1946, the International Labour Organization has been a specialized agency of the United Nations, with objectives including establishing and overseeing international labor standards and labor rights. The International Labour Office ("ILO") is the Organization’s research body and publishing house. Since 1950, the ILO has periodically published guidelines on how to classify chest X-rays for pneumoconiosis. The purpose of the Classification was to describe and codify radiographic abnormalities of the pneumoconioses in a simple, systematic, and reproducible manner, aiding international comparisons of data, epidemiology, screening and surveillance, clinical purposes, and medical research. The most recent edition of the Guidelines, completed in 2011, replaced the 2000 revised edition.

In 1974, after studies of surveillance programs for coal miners revealed unacceptable degrees of interreader variability, the National Institute for Occupational Safety and Health (NIOSH), began the "B" reader program (so named because of the Black lung or Coal Workers' X-ray Surveillance Program), with the intent to train and certify physicians in the ILO Classification system. The "B" reader certification examination went into full operation in 1978. A physician must pass the certification examination to be a "B" reader.

== Basic Description ==
The ILO Classification system includes the printed Guidelines and sets of standard radiographs, available in both film and, as of 2011, digital forms. The reader compares the subject chest X-ray (only the appearances seen on postero-anterior, or PA, chest x-ray) with those of the standard set. The standard radiographs provide differing types ("shape and size") and severity ("profusion") of abnormalities seen in persons with pneumoconiosis, including Coal Workers’ Pneumoconiosis, silicosis, and asbestosis. The reader then classifies the subject x-ray, often recording the findings on the NIOSH Roentgenographic Interpretation form. The ILO Classification system pertains to pulmonary parenchymal abnormalities (small and large opacities), pleural changes (pleural plaques, calcification, and diffuse pleural thickening) and other features associated, or sometimes confused, with occupational lung disease.

The "Complete Set" of standard x-rays consists of 22 radiographs: two illustrating normal profusion, fifteen of differing profusion category and shape/size of small opacity (see below), three illustrating large opacity, one of "u"-sized small opacity, and one of various pleural abnormalities. The "Quad Set" consists of 14 radiographs, nine of the most commonly used standards from the Complete Set, plus five additional composite reproductions of quadrant sections from the other radiographs in the Complete Set. The film sets were new to coincide with the ILO (2000) Guidelines; the digital set is new and coincides with the 2011 Guidelines.

== Methodology ==
- Technical Quality (formerly Film Quality):

In the current ILO Classification system, the reader is first asked to grade radiographic quality. There are four technical grades: (1) Good; (2) Acceptable, with no technical defect likely to impair classification; (3) Acceptable, with some technical defect but still adequate; and (4) Unacceptable. Quality defects include over- or under-exposure, underinflation, artifacts, improper positioning, and others.

- Parenchymal Abnormalities:
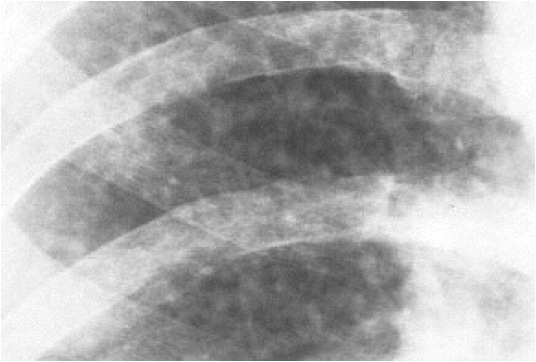
  Close-up right upper zone 2/2 R/R

Small Opacities: The reader will categorize small opacities according to shape and size. The small, rounded opacities are p (up to about 1.5 mm), q (about 1.5 mm to about 3 mm), or r (exceeding about 3mm and up to about 10 mm). Small, irregular opacities are classified by width as s, t, or u (same respective sizes as for small, rounded opacities).

Lung Zones: Each lung is mentally subdivided by the reader into 3 evenly spaced zones: upper, middle, and lower. The zones in which the small parenchymal opacities appear are recorded.

Profusion: Using the Standard X-rays, the profusion (concentration) of small opacities is classified on a 4-point major category scale (0, 1, 2, or 3), with each major category divided into three, giving 12 ordered subcategories of increasing profusion: 0/-, 0/0, 0/1, 1/0, 1/1, 1/2, 2/1, 2/2, 2/3, 3/2, 3/3, and 3/+. Category 0 refers to the absence of small opacity and category 3 represents the most profuse. The major category (first number) represents the profusion felt to best fit the subject x-ray, and the minor category (second number) represents either the profusion seriously considered as an alternative, or if none, the same profusion as the major category. For example, if the reader thinks the x-ray being read has profusion most like the standard x-ray for category 1, but serious considered category 2 as an alternative description of the profusion, then the reading is 1/2.

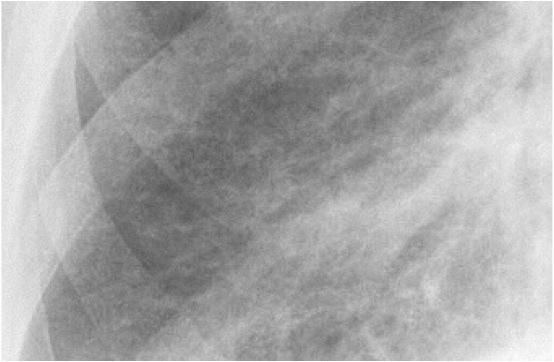
Close-up right lower zone 2/2 S/S

Large opacities: A large opacity is defined as any opacity greater than 1 cm in diameter. They are classified as Category A (for one or more large opacities whose combined longest dimension does not exceed about 50 mm), category B (for one or more large opacities whose combined longest dimension exceeds 50 mm but does not exceed the equivalent area of the right upper lung zone), or category C (for one or more large opacities whose combined longest dimension exceed the equivalent area of the right upper lung zone).

- Pleural Abnormalities:

Pleural abnormalities are reported with respect to type (pleural plaques or diffuse pleural thickening), location (chest wall, diaphragm, or other), presence of calcification, width (only of in profile pleural thickening seen along the chest wall edge), and extent (combined distance for involved chest wall).

- Any Other Abnormality:

There are 29 "obligatory" symbols representing important features related to dust diseases of the lungs and other etiologies. These symbols are: aa atherosclerotic aorta; at significant apical pleural thickening; ax coalescence of small opacities; bu bulla(e); ca cancer; cg calcified granuloma; cn calcification of small pneumoconiotic opacities; co abnormal cardiac shape or size; cp cor pulmonale; cv cavity; di marked distortion of an intrathoracic structure; ef pleural effusion; em emphysema; es eggshell calcification of hilar lymph node; fr rib fracture(s); hi enlargement of non-calcified hilar nodes; ho honeycombing; id ill-defined diaphragm border; ih ill-defined heart border; kl septal (Kerley) lines; me mesothelioma (pleural). pa plate atelectasis; pb parenchymal bands; pi pleural thickening of an interlobar fissure; px pneumothorax; ra rounded atelectasis; rp rheumatoid pneumoconiosis; tb tuberculosis; and od other disease or significant abnormality. Finally, the reader comments on any other abnormal features of the chest radiograph or other relevant information.
