= B reader =

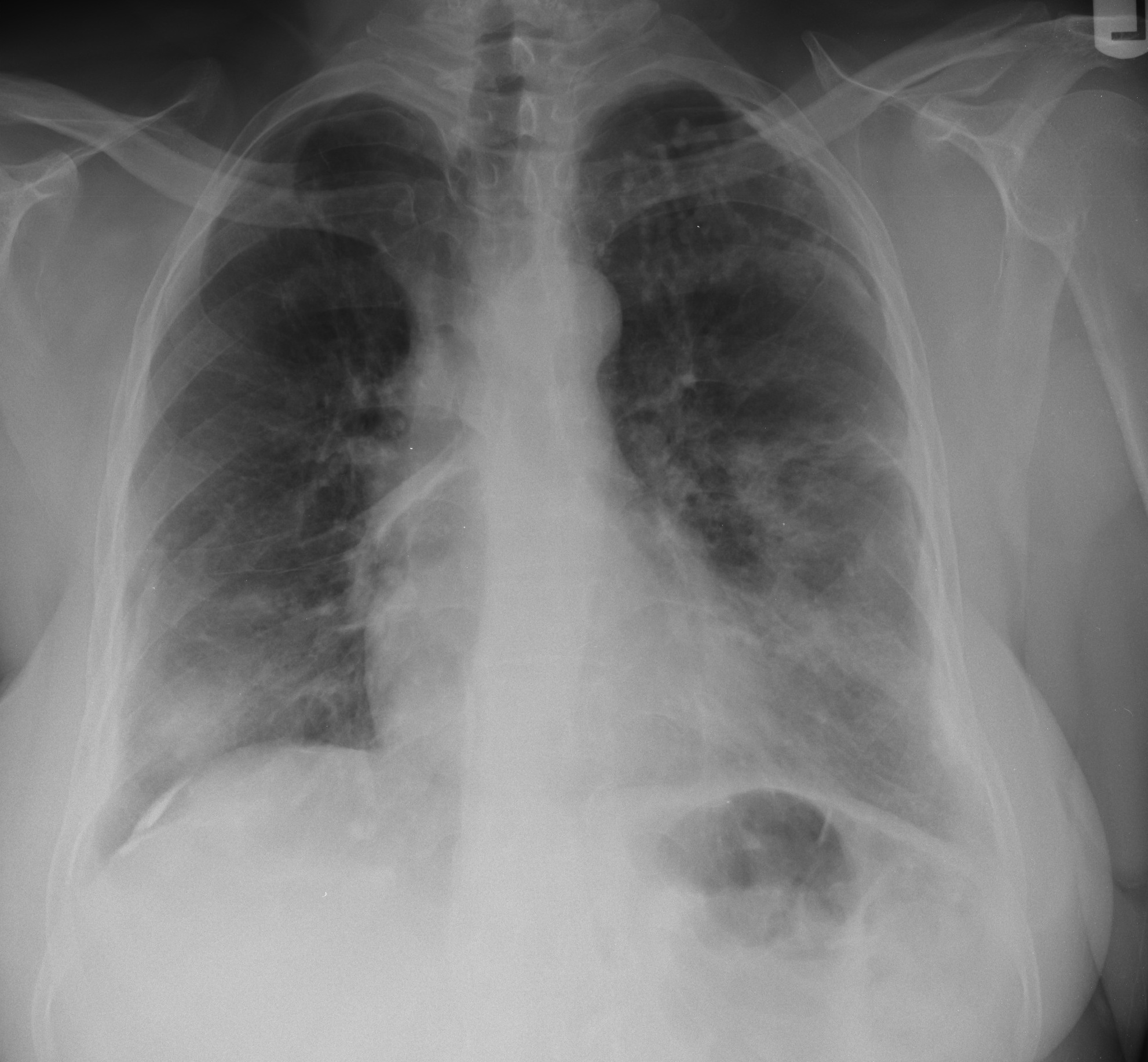
Radiographic image of a person with asbestosis

A "B" reader is a physician certified by the National Institute for Occupational Safety and Health (NIOSH) as demonstrating proficiency in classifying radiographs of the pneumoconioses.

== History ==
In 1974, after studies of surveillance programs for coal miners revealed unacceptable degrees of reader variability, NIOSH began the "B" reader program (so named because of the Black lung or Coal Workers' X-ray Surveillance Program), with the intent to train and certify physicians in the ILO Classification system (for classifying radiographs for the presence of pneumoconiosis), so as to insure that physicians using this system were as accurate and precise as possible. The "B" reader certification examination system went into full operation in 1978. The current examination involves a timed classification of 125 radiographs. A physician must pass the certification examination to be a "B" reader and certification lasts 4 years. Examinations are offered monthly at the Appalachian Laboratory for Occupational Safety and Health (ALOSH) located in Morgantown, West Virginia.

=== B Reader involvement in mesothelioma cases ===
B Reader testimony has been used extensively in mesothelioma personal injury lawsuits.

== Objectives of the "B" reader program ==
The original objective of the "B" reader examination was to identify physicians who were qualified to serve in national pneumoconiosis programs, particularly regarding epidemiological research and compensation of coal miners. Currently, "B" readers are involved with epidemiological evaluation, surveillance, and worker monitoring programs involving many types of pneumoconioses, not just the Coal Workers' programs. The "B" reader program aims to ensure competency in radiographic reading by evaluating the ability of readers to classify a test set of radiographs, thereby creating and maintaining a pool of qualified readers having the skills and ability to provide accurate and precise ILO classifications.

== Certified "B" readers ==
As of 2/16/10 there were 272 NIOSH-certified "B" readers in the US and 50 international "B" readers.

As of 10/20/17, there were 181 NIOSH-certified "B" readers in the US and 58 international "B" readers according to the Centers for Disease Control and Prevention website.

== Reader variability ==
Inter-reader variability occurs when readers disagree amongst themselves on a classification. Intra-reader variability occurs when a reader classifies a radiograph differently on different occasions. Reader variability was one of the factors prompting the ILO to develop the ILO Classification system and was a catalyst for NIOSH's development of the "B" reader program.

NIOSH notes that excessive, reader variability can reduce the quality and utility of the data. Inter-reader variability can be random or systematic. Systematic variation between readers, in which one reader consistently reports more or less abnormality than another, is related to bias, according to NIOSH. Bias can occur when a reader has information concerning the radiograph being classified (including information regarding the worker, such as exposure), by consciously or unconsciously influencing their classification. In a study comparing interpretations by "B" readers retained by lawyers in asbestos litigation compared to those from an independent blinded panel of "B" readers, there was an exceptionally high rate of disagreement (95.9% positive versus 4.5% positive, respectively).

== NIOSH Code of Ethics for "B" readers ==
NIOSH has established the following Code of Ethics for "B" readers:

1. The B Reader's primary commitment is to serve the welfare and best interests of patients, workers, and society by striving to classify chest radiographs as accurately as possible.
2. B Readers shall uphold the standards of professionalism, be honest and objective in all professional interactions, and strive to report individuals or enterprises that they know to be deficient in character or competence, or engaging in fraud or deception, to appropriate entities.
3. B Readers shall recognize the limitations of chest radiograph classifications, and shall not make clinical diagnoses about the pneumoconioses based on chest radiograph classification alone.
4. When a contemporary chest radiograph is classified, the B Reader shall either take responsibility for assuring to the extent feasible that the examined individual is promptly notified of all clinically important findings or must be assured that another appropriate party is taking that responsibility.
5. B Readers shall respect the law; the rights of patients, other health professionals, and clients; and shall safeguard medical information and other confidences within the constraints of the law.
6. B Readers shall continue to study and apply advances or changes to the International Labour Office International Classification of Radiographs of Pneumoconioses as specified by the NIOSH B Reader Program.
7. In providing expert medical testimony, B Readers shall ensure that the testimony provided is unbiased, medically and scientifically correct, and clinically accurate.
8. B Readers shall recognize and disclose any conflicts of interest in the outcome of a chest radiograph classification. B Readers shall not accept compensation that is contingent upon the findings of their chest radiograph classifications or the outcome of compensation proceedings or litigation for which they undertake readings.
9. B Readers shall not advertise or publicize themselves through any medium or forum of public communication in an untruthful, misleading, or deceptive manner.
10. B Readers shall promptly report to the NIOSH B Reader Program any revocation or suspension of a medical license, voluntary relinquishment of a medical license or conversion to inactive status, or the voluntary surrender of a medical license while under investigation.

== Recommended practices ==
NIOSH has four categories of recommended practices:

1. Appropriate methods for imaging collection and viewing
2. Reader competency
3. Commitment to ethical classification
4. Proper reading methods (including use of the ILO system, blinding, quality assurance techniques, reader selection, remuneration, and notification)
