= Julius Jeffreys =

British surgeon

Julius Jeffreys (1800–1877) was a British surgeon and writer, was the inventor of the respirator, and was a pioneer in the development of early air conditioning systems.

== Early life ==
Julius Jeffreys was born on 14 September 1800 at Hall Place, Bexley, Kent, England, where his father was the principal of a private school. He was the tenth of sixteen children born to the Reverend Richard and Sarah Jeffreys. When he was three, the family moved to India, where his father had accepted a post as chaplain to the British East India Company. While in India the family was based in Calcutta, but spent some months travelling along the Ganges river on a houseboat. Sarah died in 1809. The family returned to England around 1811.

== Education and training ==
Along with most of his brothers, Julius was educated by their father. Most of his brothers attended Cambridge University, but Julius was admitted to the University of Edinburgh in 1817 to study medicine. He completed his medical education in London, possibly at Guy's hospital. Julius was admitted a member of the Royal College of Surgeons of England on 1 March 1822.

== India ==
In 1822, Jeffreys received an appointment of staff surgeon to the HEIC, and was assigned to Calcutta, where he was assigned to duties at the General Hospital. Hearing of the beneficial climate of the remote hill station of Simla (Shimla), Julius obtained a leave of absence and visited the outpost in 1824. While in Simla, Julius wrote an article "Climate of the Hill Provinces (of the Himalayas), and its Connexion with Pathology". The article resulted in the establishment of additional Himalayan hill stations, and his promotion to staff surgeon in the army camp at Cawnpore (Kanpur). While at Cawnpore he invented several air-conditioning systems, including an evaporation cooling system which he termed the refrigerator. He married Ellen Penelope Dougan, in 1825. The couple had five children, before Ellen died on their return journey to England in 1835.

== The Respirator ==
On his arrival in England in 1835, Julius was distressed to find his now-widowed sister, Harriett, suffering from tuberculosis, and he was shocked by the general prevalence of lung diseases in England. In a time before there were medications to treat these ailments, mortality data from the period shows that, except during epidemics, the most common cause of death was lung afflictions.

Julius invented a mask, which he called a "Respirator". The mask worked by capturing moisture and warmth in exhaled air in a grid of fine metal wires. Inhaled air then was warmed and moistened as it passed through the same metal grid, providing relief to sufferers of lung diseases. The invention was patented and received patent number 10287, in 1836. The Respirator became very popular, and was mentioned in the literature of the day, including in the writings of Elizabeth Gaskell, William Makepeace Thackeray and Charles Dickens.

Despite the popularity of the Respirator, opposition came from some in the medical profession since it was sold through pharmacies and did not require a prescription.

== Statics of the Human Chest ==
In 1843 Julius published his first full-length book "Views upon the statics of the Human Chest, Animal Heat, and determinations of Blood to the Head". 'Statics' made some important contributions to the understanding of lung volume. Julius was the first to describe that we do not inhale and exhale the full capacity of the lungs when we breathe, instead leaving air in the lungs when we have 'fully' exhaled, and being able to further inhale after we have taken a breath. Indeed, in Dr. David Zuck's 1991 article "Julius Jeffreys and the Physiology of Lung Volumes" he concluded that Julius was the first physician to describe all of the aspects of lung volumes except the 'dead space' (inhaled air that never reaches the areas of the lung where gas exchange can occur). Immediately after publication the book received praise and acclaim from many eminent scientists and medical practitioners.

== Inventions ==
In recognition of his achievements, in the late 1830s and early 1840s Julius was elected to a number of learned societies, including the Royal Institution, Royal Society and Royal Medical and Chirurgical Society. During the 1840s Julius contemplated emigration to New Zealand, but, while he persuaded numerous of his relatives and friends to emigrate, and purchased a large parcel of land near Dunedin, he eventually decided against the move. In 1851 Julius married Jane Mary Graham, 20 years his junior. The couple had five children between 1852 and 1863.

With so many of his relatives travelling by sea, Julius's thoughts turned to their safety. He considered how lifeboats were launched, and developed an improved method for this, which he described in the 1852 publication, "On the constantly recurring loss of life through the inefficiency of ships' boats; and on the right application of mechanical principles to the subject". He explains how to best suspend, lower and clear lifeboats. The techniques were successfully demonstrated and he signed the rights of the invention to the "Shipwrecked Fishermen and Mariners' Society". In 1853 he took a large model of the apparatus on a tour of Wales and Liverpool, where it attracted a great deal of attention and was adopted for the lifeboat of the vessel "Goldfinger".

== British Army in India ==
In 1858, a year after the Indian Mutiny, Julius published "The British Army in India: its preservation by an appropriate clothing, housing, locating, recreative employment, and hopeful encouragement of the troops." Amongst other topics it describes Indian industry and arts, climate, resource development, administration and justice and economic value of India.

In describing headgear, Julius explains that a hat should have ventilation to permit the free flow of air by convection. There follows discussion of close to 50 pages on headgear, including development of the "Pith Helmet", used by British Troops in the tropics for a century.

Chapters on clothing are followed by a section on housing. Julius describes a double roof for dwellings, with an air gap between the inner and outer roof to reduce direct radiant heating. He describes ventilating machines in detail, including a cooling system using subterranean tubes and the Refrigerator (his own invention), and based on evaporative cooling.

The book contains a 31-page appendix on "The traffic in opium in the East", in which Julius vehemently attacks the trade and use of the drug in India, China and Britain. He considers the detrimental physiological effects, and the impact of the East India Company on its trade, which he had previously denounced shortly after his return from India.

Julius noted that it cost more to maintain a military presence in India than the British Government received from the country. In an interesting insight into Julius's views on warfare he stated: "...the necessity of self defence is the only evidence of Divine permission to engage in warfare, and 'precautional' warfare is a dangerous step."

The tome was carefully written, and is more easily read than many of his earlier works. It contains anecdotes and stories from his time in India, and it received numerous commendatory reviews.

== Retirement ==
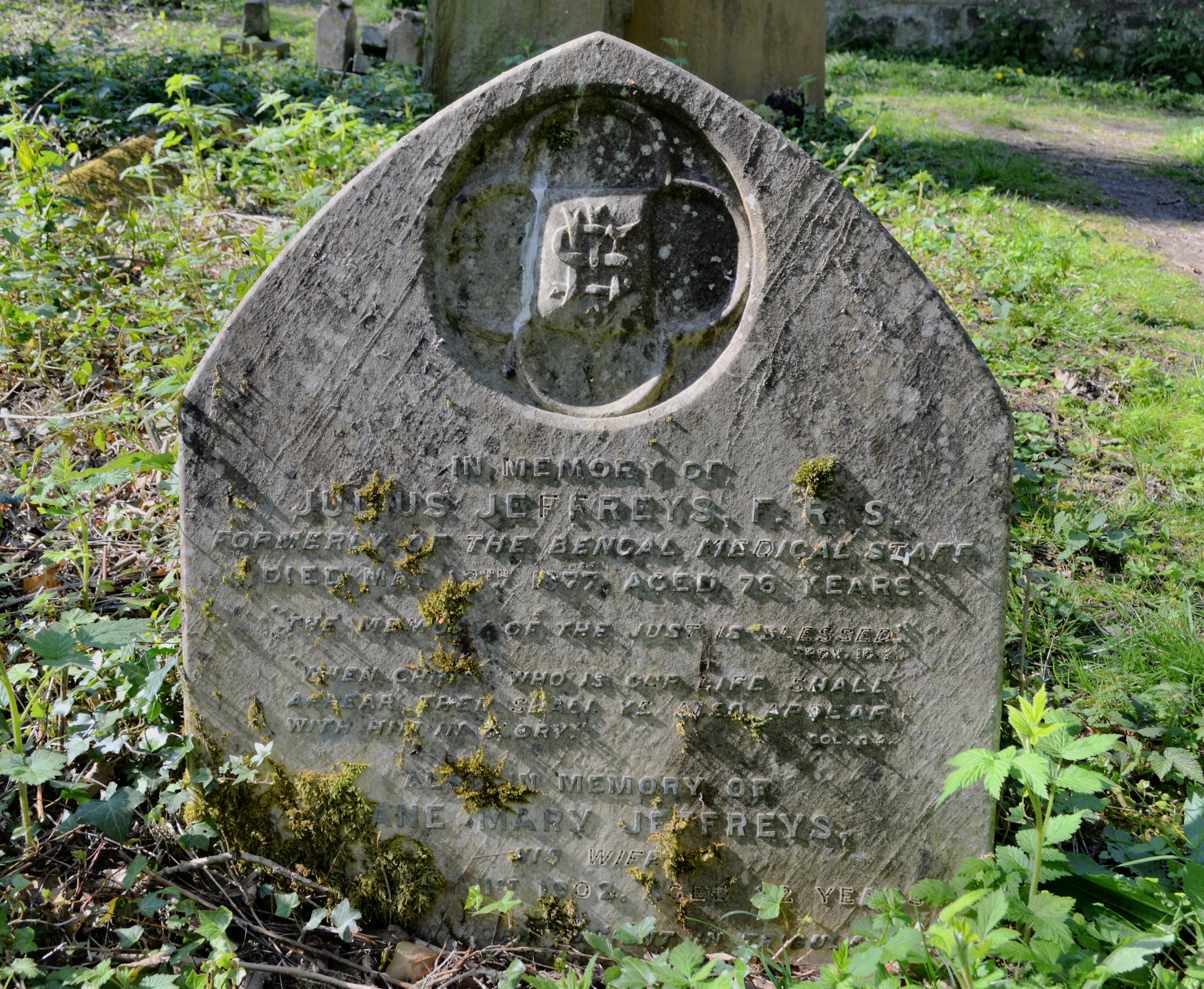
Richmond Old Cemetery

After the publication of "The British Army in India" Julius reduced his output of scientific papers, but continued to seek patent coverage for inventions as diverse as respirator improvements, sun blinds, furnaces, fireplaces and freezing meat. Julius died on 13 May 1877, at Park Villas West, Queen's Road, Richmond, Surrey. He was 76 years old. He was buried in Richmond Cemetery.

== Sources ==
D. Zuck, Julius Jeffreys and the Physiology of Lung Volumes, Proc. History of Anaesthesia Society – June 1990, Vol. 8b, pp55–61

A. Marshall & J. Marshall, Striving for the Comfort Zone: A Perspective on Julius Jeffreys. Windy Knoll Publications 2004. ISBN 0-9754695-0-9

E. Jeffreys, A Confutative Biographical Notice of Julius Jeffreys, Longman & Co., London 1855.

J. Jeffreys "The British Army in India: its preservation by an appropriate clothing, housing, locating, recreative employment, and hopeful encouragement of the troops." London 1858.

J. Jeffreys, Views upon the statics of the human chest, animal heat, and determinations of blood to the head. London 1843.
