= Voluntary surrender =

In the United States, voluntary surrender is when a licensee chooses voluntarily to surrender one's license or voluntarily agrees not to renew one's license, usually to resolve outstanding complaints instead of going through the process of revocation or suspension. Voluntary surrender is often viewed as a proactive action and is considered to be more amiable than having the sanction of revocation or suspension on their record.
