= Hypoallergenic vacuum cleaner =

A hypoallergenic vacuum cleaner is a vacuum cleaner with filters designed to retain the vast majority (ideally at least 99.97%) of particles within the vacuum system. If successful this retention would greatly reduce the amount of potential allergens in the environment in which it is used. Regular vacuum cleaners are unable to retain most very fine dust and many allergens which simply are too small for the system to trap and are released from the system along with the exhaust air.

However, studies have shown that even vacuum cleaners featuring HEPA (High Efficiency Particulate Air) filters tend to release a large amount of allergens back into the air in the exhaust. In general, more recent and more expensive models do perform better than older and less expensive ones.

== Technology ==
While regular vacuum cleaners are designed to simply contain visible dirt and debris, hypoallergenic vacuums are designed to trap almost all of the smaller particles which in a regular vacuum are simply re-circulated into the ambient air. While this is not an issue for most people who do not suffer allergies, many with particular sensitivities to allergens (including asthma) can find that this not only does not help their condition, but stirring the dust into the air can make the condition worse.

Most modern hypoallergenic vacuum cleaners use a system consisting of four primary components: the final output filter (generally a HEPA or similar filter), the motor and fan or impeller assembly, secondary particle filter to protect the motor assembly, and a primary filter - a bag, cup or wet filter bucket (each of which provide the initial filtration and retention of most dust and contaminants).

Modern high quality hypoallergenic vacuum cleaners generally use HEPA filters to trap the vast majority (at least 99.97%) of very small particles that other vacuum cleaners would simply re-emit into the ambient air - ideally specifying a recognised and independently tested HEPA filter grade rather than just using the term. Recently many cheaper 'HEPA type' filters have appeared on the market attempting to capitalise on the term, these are generally inferior and do not meet the stringent requirements set by the US Dept of Energy (or in Europe EN 1822) to call themselves HEPA, and have not been independently tested to assess their ability to stop dust egress. While many dry bagless systems include HEPA grade filtration, the user is generally exposed to the very dust and allergens they are trying to avoid during emptying/cleaning the system. Anti-allergy bagged systems avoid most of this risk with a bag that will contain dirt and contaminants, and wet filter bagless systems also allow emptying without exposure to airborne particles as it is contained in a 'mud'. While Wet filter systems do avoid the cost and environmental waste of needing new bag for every filling, like wet/dry and shampooing machines they do generally require a very small amount of anti foaming agent, though this is generally environmentally benign.

Some Hypoallergenic vacuum bags differ a great deal from non-hypoallergenic bags. Hypoallergenic bags often come in two pieces, an inner and outer bag. The inner bag (which captures the dirt) will be disposable and completely contained. Outer bags will sometimes take the place of a filter all together filtering out dust and allergens out of the air. Some modern hypoallergenic vacuum cleaners will use the two bag system with the outer bag made up of high-performance filtration material treated with antimicrobials to impede the growth of mold, bacteria and other parasites. A two bag system will still require a final HEPA filter to be able to comply with the standards of HEPA filtration. All good Hypo-allergenic systems are designed, not just to contain 99+% of containments (99.97% in the case of HEPA systems), but to clean the air while cleaning the floors, some, including water filter models, achieving retention of particles over 0.3 micrometer diameter of 99.99% (1 particle in 10,000 released).

HEPA filters alone are not enough for even the best vacuum cleaner to work effectively. Whether it’s bagged or bagless, a truly hypoallergenic vacuum requires that it have a completely sealed system. All intake air must pass through the dirt capture and filtration systems before it exits the vacuum, any leaks will allow dust and allergens to be ejected back into the air you breathe before the HEPA filter has a chance to do its job, meaning the system itself is no longer HEPA grade despite the presence of such a filter. However, some users who suffer from dust mite allergies, evidence a preference for bagless technology; as most of the dirt is trapped inside the chamber via the use of cyclonic technology, which is, by design, a potentially inherently cleaner technology.

Despite progress in filtration systems for vacuum cleaners, central vacuums that vent outdoors or into a nonliving space are preferable for individuals with allergies or asthma, because they prevent indoor emissions altogether.

== See also ==
- Manual vacuum cleaner
- Central vacuum cleaner
