= Minimum efficiency reporting value =

Measurement scale for the effectiveness of air filters

Minimum Efficiency Reporting Value, commonly known as MERV, is a measurement scale designed in 1987 by the American Society of Heating, Refrigerating and Air-Conditioning Engineers (ASHRAE) to report the effectiveness of air filters in more detail than other ratings. For example, often a high-efficiency particulate air (HEPA) filter is impractical in residential central heating, ventilation, and air conditioning (HVAC) systems due to the large pressure drop the dense filter material causes. Experiments indicate that less obstructive, medium-efficiency filters of MERV 7 to 13 are almost as effective as true HEPA filters at removing allergens within residential air handling units.

== MERV scale ==
The MERV scale is designed to represent the worst-case performance of a filter when dealing with particles in the range of 0.3 to 10 micrometers. The MERV value is from 1 to 16. Higher MERV values correspond to a greater percentage of particles captured on each pass, with a MERV 16 filter capturing more than 95% of particles over the full range. The following table is a grouping of MERV values by particle size:

| MERV | Minimum particle size | Typical controlled contaminant | Typical application |
|---|---|---|---|
| 1–4 | > 10.0 μm | Pollen, dust mites, cockroach debris, sanding dust, spray paint dust, textile fibers, carpet fibers | Residential window A-C units |
| 5–8 (Note: ANSI/ASHRAE Standard 62.1-2007 requires a filter of at least MERV 6 efficiency for residential applications in the U.S.) | 10.0–3.0 μm ("E3") | Mold spores, dust mite debris, cat and dog dander, hair spray, fabric protector, dusting aids, pudding mix | Better residential, general commercial, industrial workspaces |
| 9–12 | 3.0–1.0 μm ("E2") | Legionella, humidifier dust, lead dust, milled flour, auto emission particulates, nebulizer droplets | Superior residential, better commercial, hospital laboratories |
| 13–16 | 1.0–0.3 μm ("E1") | Bacteria, droplet nuclei (sneeze), cooking oil, most smoke and insecticide dust, most face powder, most paint pigments | Hospital and general surgery |

While the lowest MERV value in each row has no minimum requirement for filtering the particle size for that row, it does have stricter requirements for all larger particle sizes than any lower MERV value. For example, MERV 13 has no minimum requirement for removing 0.3–1.0 μm particles (the standard specifies <75%) but has higher minimum requirements for removing 1.0–3.0 μm, 3.0–10.0 μm, and > 10 μm particles than MERV 12 and all lower MERV values. All other MERV values on each row do have minimum removal percentages for that row's particle size.

== Similar scales ==
Two proprietary scales are used to rate sub-HEPA air filters.

The Home Depot scale is known as the Filter Performance Rating (FPR), and is reduced from a 1–10 scale to only 5, 7, 9, and 10. It measures ability to capture large particles, small particles, and weight change over the lifetime of the filter.

The 3M scale is known as microparticle performance rating (MPR) and measures the ability to filter particles 0.3 to 1 microns.

Although the standards measure slightly different attributes and thus are not strictly convertible, one retailer reported the following typical equivalents:

| MERV | FPR | MPR |
|---|---|---|
| 6 | (below lowest rating) | 300 |
| 8 | 5 | 600 |
| 11 | 7 | 1000-1200 |
| 13 | 10 | 1500-1900 |

== See also ==
- Corsi–Rosenthal Box, a do-it-yourself air purifier
- Ultra-low particulate air (ULPA), a type of air filter that can remove particles larger than 120 nm

== Sources ==
- M.N.Rama Rao & Company. "Industrial Filters (Eurovent and ASHRAE Classifications)".
- Newell, Donald (February 2006). "Interpreting Filter Performance: The meaning behind the terminology of ASHRAE standards 52.1 and 52.2" (PDF). HPAC Engineering. Archived from the original (PDF) on 2009-01-07.
