= Microparticle performance rating =

The Microparticle Performance Rating (MPR) is an air filter rating system created by the company 3M. It rates the ability of an air filter to filter out micro particles.

Because MPR was created by 3M, it only applies to filters produced by the 3M brand.

The higher the MPR, the better the filter's ability to capture particles from the air as it passes through the filter.

MPR is different from MERV, the Minimum Efficiency Reporting Value. The MERV system measures a filter's ability to capture large particles. The MPR only takes into account the microscopic particles between 0.3 and 1 μm.
