= HEPA =

Efficiency standard of air filters

- HEPA filter corrugated internal structure and aluminium support along with the description of its functioning principle (interception, impact and diffusion of dust particles through a dense non-woven fibre material)

Overview
- Other names: High-Efficiency Particulate Air, High-Efficiency Particulate Arresting filter, HEPA
- Standards: DOE NE F 3-45, EN 1822, ISO 29463
- [edit on Wikidata]

HEPA (/ˈhɛpə/, high efficiency particulate air, or high efficiency particulate arresting) is an efficiency standard of air filters. A HEPA filter is an air filter meeting such a standard.

A HEPA filter must satisfy certain levels of efficiency. Common standards require that a HEPA air filter must remove—from the air that passes through—at least 99.95% (ISO, European Standard) or 99.97% (ASME, U.S. DOE) of particles whose diameter is equal to 0.3 μm, with the filtration efficiency increasing for particle diameters both less than and greater than 0.3 μm. HEPA filters capture pollen, dirt, dust, moisture, bacteria (0.2–2.0 μm), viruses (0.02–0.3 μm), and submicron liquid aerosol (0.02–0.5 μm). Some microorganisms, for example, Aspergillus niger, Penicillium citrinum, Staphylococcus epidermidis, and Bacillus subtilis are captured by HEPA filters with photocatalytic oxidation (PCO). A HEPA filter is also able to capture some viruses and bacteria which are ≤0.3 μm. A HEPA filter is also able to capture floor dust which contains bacteroidia, clostridia, and bacilli.

HEPA was commercialised in the 1950s, and the original term became a registered trademark and later a generic trademark for highly efficient filters. HEPA filters are used in applications that require contamination control, such as the manufacturing of hard disk drives, medical devices, semiconductors, nuclear, food and pharmaceutical products, as well as in hospitals, homes, and vehicles.

== Mechanism ==
The four primary filter collection mechanisms: diffusion, interception, inertial impaction, and electrostatic attraction (air flow direction from left to right)

Classic Collection Efficiency Curve with Filter Collection Mechanisms

HEPA filters are composed of a mat of randomly arranged fibres. The fibres are typically composed of polypropylene or fibreglass with diameters between 0.5 and 2.0 micrometres. Most of the time, these filters are composed of tangled bundles of fine fibres. These fibres create a narrow convoluted pathway through which air passes. When the largest particles are passing through this pathway, the bundles of fibres behave like a kitchen sieve which physically blocks the particles from passing through. However, when smaller particles pass with the air, as the air twists and turns, the smaller particles cannot keep up with the motion of the air and thus they collide with the fibres. The smallest particles have very little inertia and move randomly as a result of collisions with individual air molecules (Brownian motion). Because of their movement, they end up crashing into the fibres. Key factors affecting its functions are fibre diameter, filter thickness, and face velocity, which is the measured air speed at an inlet or outlet of a heating ventilation and air conditioning (HVAC) system. Face velocity is measured in m/s and can be calculated as the volume flow rate (m^{3}/s) divided by the face area (m^{2}). The air space between HEPA filter fibres is typically much greater than 0.3 μm. Unlike sieves or membrane filters, where particles smaller than openings or pores can pass through, HEPA filters are designed to target a range of particle sizes. These particles are trapped (they stick to a fibre) through a combination of the following three mechanisms:

1. Diffusion; particles below 0.3 μm are captured by diffusion in a HEPA filter. This mechanism is a result of the collision with gas molecules by the smallest particles, especially those below 0.1 μm in diameter. The small particles are effectively blown or bounced around and collide with the filter media fibres. This behaviour is similar to Brownian motion and raises the probability that a particle will be stopped by either interception or impaction; this mechanism becomes dominant at lower airflow.
2. Interception; particles following a line of flow in the air stream come within one radius of a fibre and adhere to it. Mid size particles are being captured by this process.
3. Impaction; larger particles are unable to avoid fibres by following the curving contours of the air stream and are forced to embed in one of them directly; this effect increases with diminishing fibre separation and higher air flow velocity.

Diffusion predominates below the 0.1 μm diameter particle size, whilst impaction and interception predominate above 0.4 μm. In between, near the most penetrating particle size (MPPS) 0.21 μm, both diffusion and interception are comparatively inefficient. Because this is the weakest point in the filter's performance, the HEPA specifications use the retention of particles near this size (0.3 μm) to classify the filter. However it is possible for particles smaller than the MPPS to not have filtering efficiency greater than that of the MPPS. This is due to the fact that these particles can act as nucleation sites for mostly condensation and form particles near the MPPS.

=== Gas filtration ===
HEPA filters are designed to arrest very fine particles effectively, but they do not filter out gasses and odour molecules. Circumstances requiring filtration of volatile organic compounds, chemical vapours, or cigarette, pet or flatulence odours call for the use of an activated carbon (charcoal) or other type of filter instead of or in addition to a HEPA filter. Carbon cloth filters, claimed to be many times more efficient than the granular activated carbon form at adsorption of gaseous pollutants, are known as high efficiency gas adsorption filters (HEGA) and were originally developed by the British Armed Forces as a defence against chemical warfare.

=== Pre-filter and HEPA filter ===
A HEPA bag filter can be used in conjunction with a pre-filter (usually carbon-activated) to extend the usage life of the more expensive HEPA filter. In such setup, the first stage in the filtration process is made up of a pre-filter which removes most of the larger dust, hair, PM10 and pollen particles from the air. The second stage high-quality HEPA filter removes the finer particles that escape from the pre-filter. This is common in air handling units.

== Specifications ==
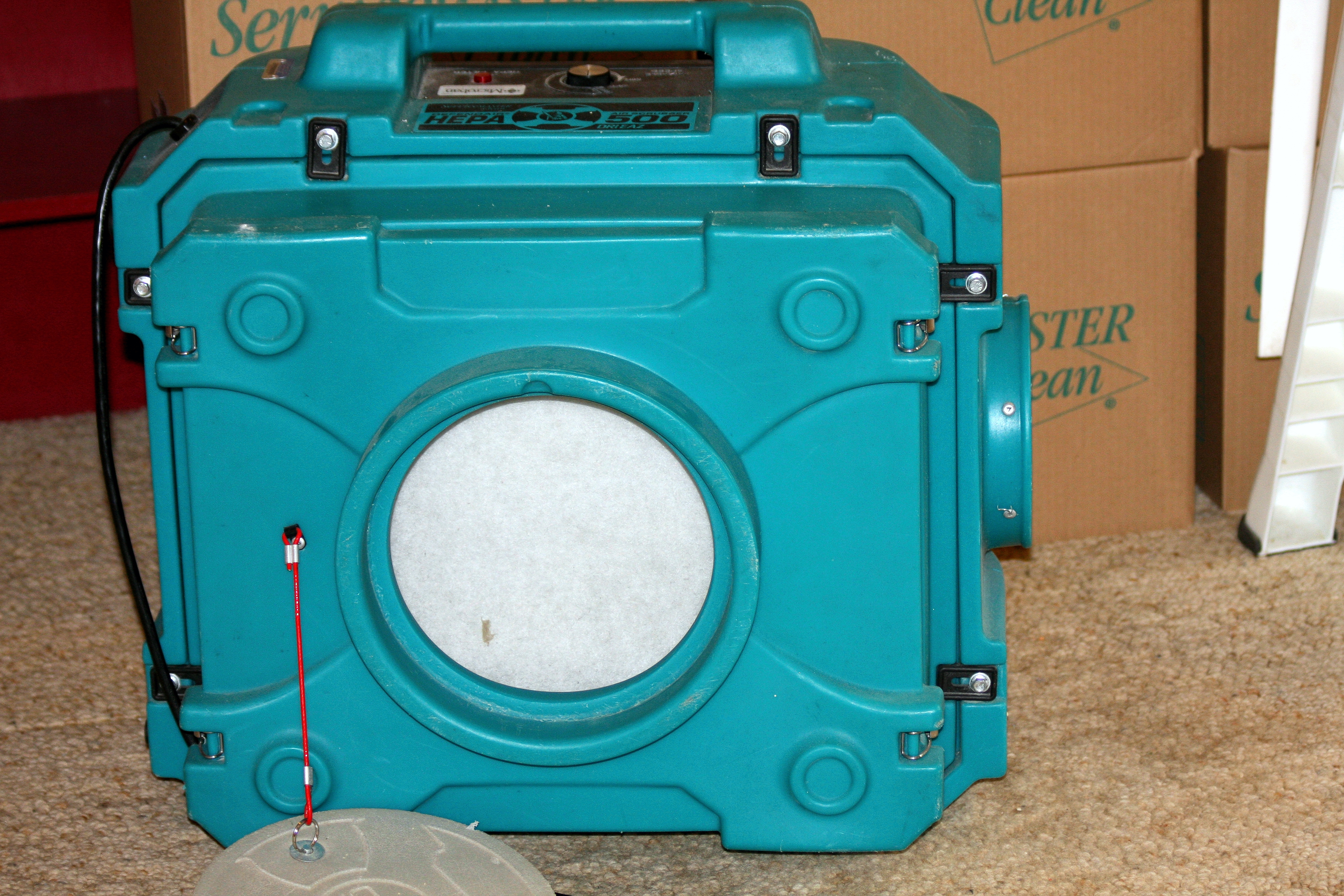
A portable HEPA filtration unit used to clean air after a fire, or during manufacturing processes

HEPA filters, as defined by the United States Department of Energy (DOE) standard adopted by most American industries, remove at least 99.97% of aerosols 0.3 micrometres (μm) in diameter. The filter's minimal resistance to airflow, or pressure drop, is usually specified around 300 pascals (0.044 psi) at its nominal volumetric flow rate.

The specification used in the European Union: European Standard EN 1822-1:2019, from which ISO 29463 is derived, defines several classes of filters by their retention at the given most penetrating particle size (MPPS): Efficient Particulate Air filters (EPA), High Efficiency Particulate Air filters (HEPA), and Ultra Low Particulate Air filters (ULPA). The averaged efficiency of the filter is called "overall", and the efficiency at a specific point is called "local":

Efficiency	EN 1822	ISO 29463	Retention (averaged)	Retention (spot)
EPA	E10	—	≥ 85%	—
EPA	E11	ISO 15 E ISO 20 E	≥ 95% ≥ 99%	—
EPA	E12	ISO 25 E ISO 30 E	≥ 99.5% ≥ 99.9%	—
HEPA	H13	ISO 35 H ISO 40 H	≥ 99.95% ≥ 99.99%	≥ 99.75% ≥ 99.95%
HEPA	H14	ISO 45 H ISO 50 U	≥ 99.995% ≥ 99.999%	≥ 99.975% ≥ 99.995%
ULPA	U15	ISO 55 U ISO 60 U	≥ 99.9995% ≥ 99.9999%	≥ 99.9975% ≥ 99.9995%
ULPA	U16	ISO 65 U ISO 70 U	≥ 99.99995% ≥ 99.99999%	≥ 99.99975% ≥ 99.9999%
ULPA	U17	ISO 75 U	≥ 99.999995%	≥ 99.9999%

See also the different classes for air filters for comparison.

=== Specifications for respirators ===
HEPA
- Other name(s): High-Efficiency Particulate Air, High-Efficiency Particulate Arresting filter, HEPA
- Regulated by: United States Department of Energy, Mine Safety and Health Administration, National Institute for Occupational Safety and Health
- Regulation: 30 CFR 11, 42 CFR 84, DOE NE F 3-45
- NIOSH schedule: TC-21C
- [edit on Wikidata]

For respirators, MSHA and NIOSH define HEPA as filters blocking ≥ 99.97% of 0.3 micron DOP particles, under 30 CFR 11 and 42 CFR 84. Since the transition to 42 CFR 84 in 1995, use of the term HEPA has been deprecated except for powered air-purifying respirators. However, by definition, ANSI Z88.2-2015 considers N100, R100, P100, and HE as HEPA filters.

=== Marketing ===
Some companies use the marketing term "True HEPA" to give consumers assurance that their air filters meet the HEPA standard, although this term has no legal or scientific meaning. Products that are marketed to be "HEPA-type," "HEPA-like," "HEPA-style" or "99% HEPA" do not satisfy the HEPA standard and may not have been tested in independent laboratories. Although such filters may come reasonably close to HEPA standards, others fall significantly short.

== Efficacy and safety ==
In general terms (and allowing for some variation depending on factors such as the air-flow rate, the physical properties of the particles being filtered, as well as engineering details of the entire filtration-system design and not just the filter-media properties), HEPA filters experience the most difficulty in capturing particles in the size range of 0.15 to 0.2 μm. HEPA filtration works by mechanical means, unlike ionic and ozone treatment technologies, which use negative ions and ozone gas respectively. So, the likelihood of potential triggering of pulmonary side-effects such as asthma and allergies is much lower with HEPA purifiers.

To ensure that a HEPA filter is working efficiently, the filters should be inspected and changed at least every six months in commercial settings. In residential settings, and depending on the general ambient air quality, these filters can be changed every two to three years. Failing to change a HEPA filter in a timely fashion will result in it putting stress on the machine or system and not removing particles from the air properly. Additionally, depending on the gasketing materials chosen in the design of the system, a clogged HEPA filter can result in extensive bypassing of airflow around the filter.

== Applications ==
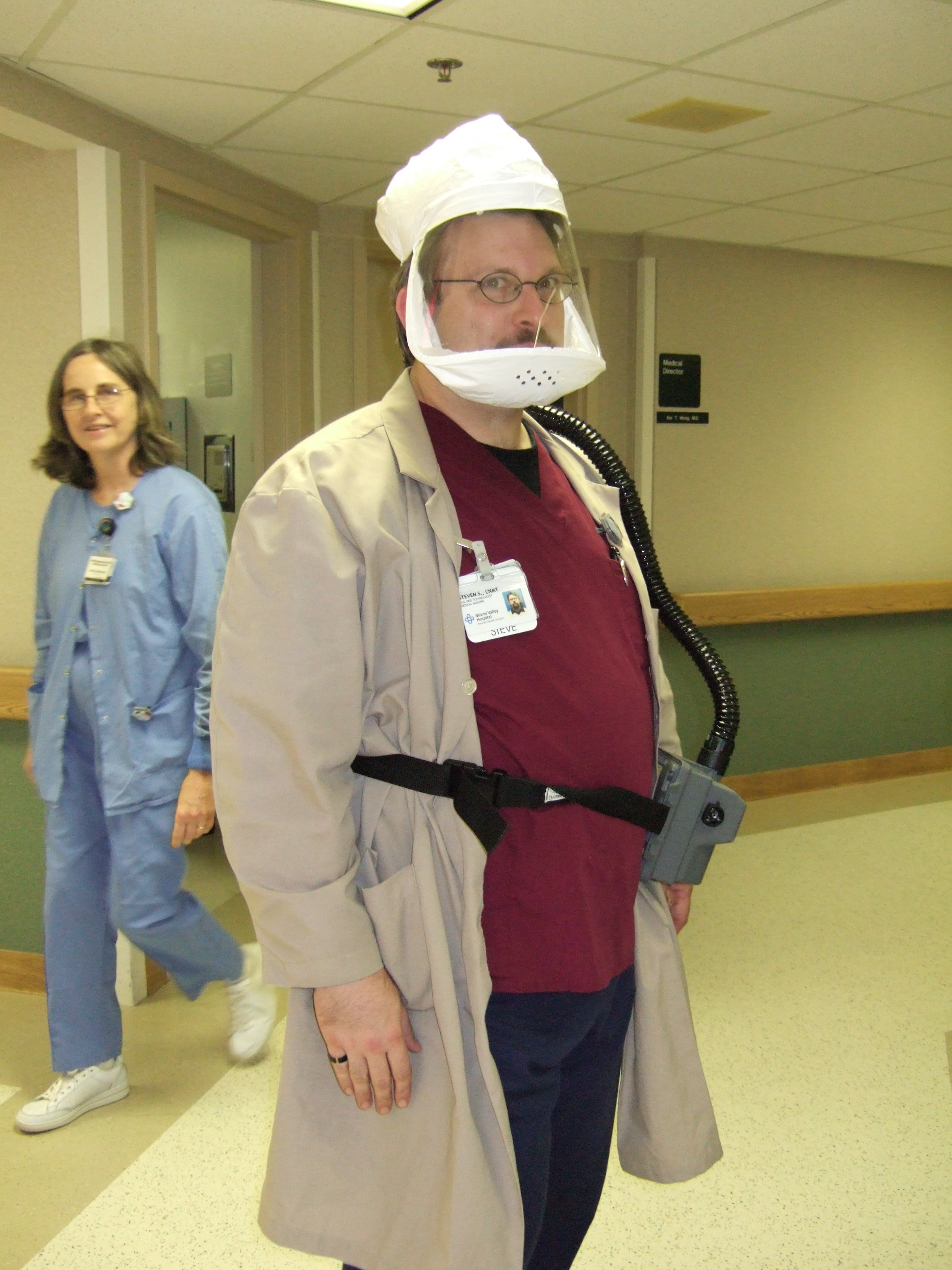
Hospital staff modelling a powered, air-purifying respirator (PAPR) fitted with a HEPA filter, used to protect from airborne or aerosolised pathogens such as tuberculosis

=== Biomedical ===
Medical filtration systems use extreme ultraviolet light units that effectively kill bacteria, mould and viruses using panels with an anti-microbial coating to kill off the live bacteria and viruses trapped by the HEPA filter media.

Some of the best-rated HEPA units have an efficiency rating of 99.995%, which assures a very high level of protection against airborne disease transmission.

==== COVID-19 ====
HEPA filters are capable of removing viruses including COVID-19 from the air harbouring the live virus in the filter. As such, hospitals saw a surge in adoption during the pandemic in order to mitigate infection risks. To combat supply chain and cost issues hindering adoption of HEPA filters during the COVID-19 pandemic, a professor at University of California, Davis, created a simple do-it-yourself air purifier design called crbox(Corsi–Rosenthal Box). It involves arranging 4 MERV-13 filters in a cubic shape, the bottom being made out of cardboard, sealing the filter sides with tape and adding a fan on top. MERV-13 is also capable of removing the particles that contain the COVID-19 causing particles, which are invariably mixed with other material to form particles considerably larger than the actual virus . In addition, the COVID-19 Pandemic resulted in a surge of new air purifier products from new and established brands such as Dyson or Xiaomi hitting the markets.

=== Vacuum cleaners ===
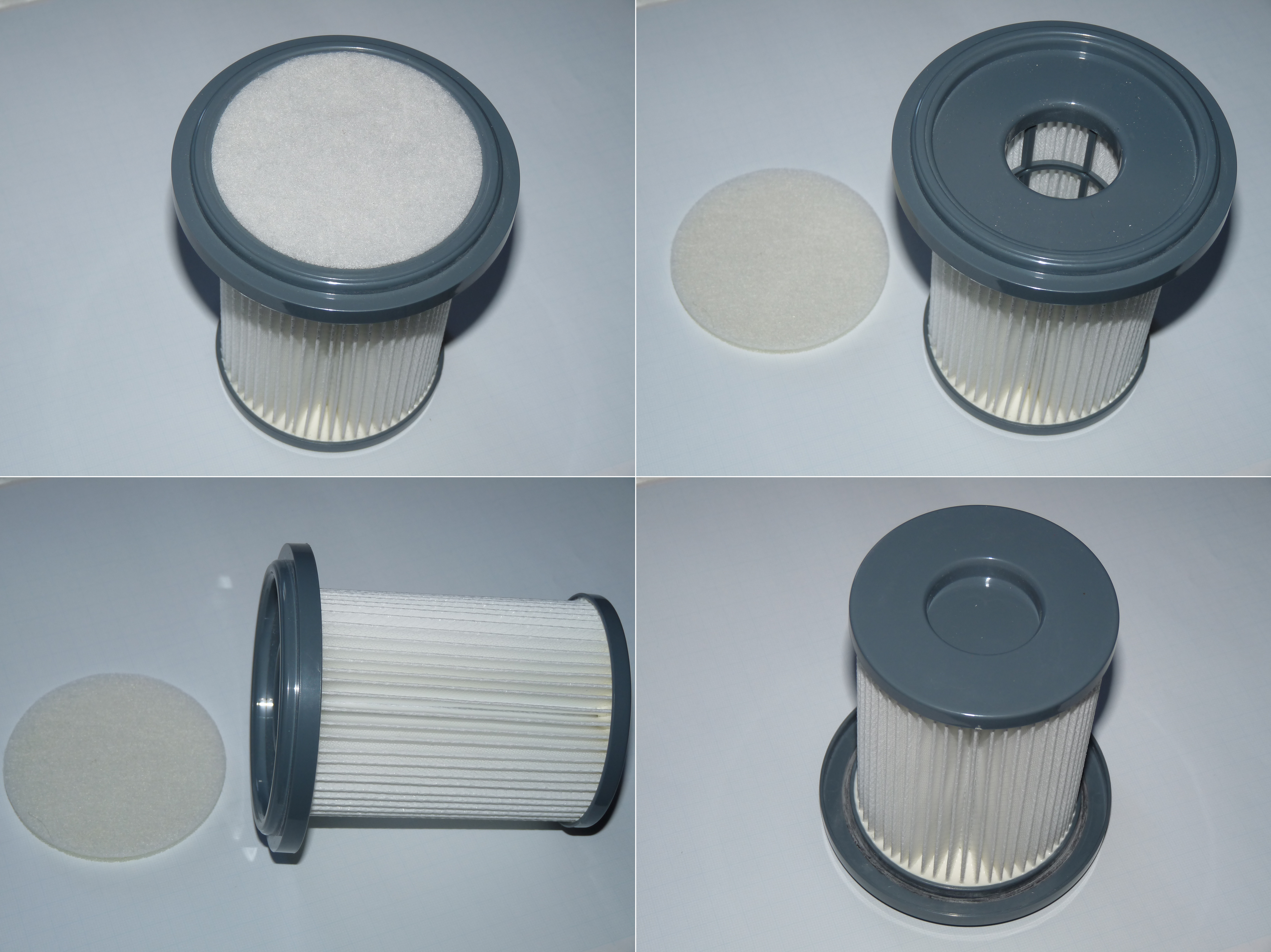
HEPA original filter for Philips FC87xx-series vacuum cleaners

Many vacuum cleaners also use HEPA filters as part of their filtration systems. This is beneficial for asthma and allergy sufferers, because the HEPA filter traps the fine particles (such as pollen and house dust mite faeces) which trigger allergy and asthma symptoms. For a HEPA filter in a vacuum cleaner to be effective, the vacuum cleaner must be designed so that all the air drawn into the machine is expelled through the filter, with none of the air leaking past it. This is often referred to as "Sealed HEPA" or sometimes the more vague "True HEPA". Vacuum cleaners simply labeled "HEPA" may have a HEPA filter, but not all air necessarily passes through it. Finally, vacuum cleaner filters marketed as "HEPA-like" will typically use a filter of a similar construction to HEPA, but without the filtering efficiency. Because of the extra density of a true HEPA filter, HEPA vacuum cleaners require more powerful motors to provide adequate cleaning power.

A high-quality HEPA filter can trap 99.97% of dust particles that are 0.3 microns in diameter. For comparison, a human hair is about 50 to 150 microns in diameter. So, a true HEPA filter is effectively trapping particles several hundred times smaller than the width of a human hair. Some manufacturers claim filter standards such as "HEPA 4," without explaining the meaning behind them. This refers to their Minimum Efficiency Reporting Value (MERV) rating. These ratings are used to rate the ability of an air cleaner filter to remove dust from the air as it passes through the filter. MERV is a standard used to measure the overall efficiency of a filter. The MERV scale ranges from 1 to 16, and measures a filter's ability to remove particles from 10 to 0.3 micrometre in size. Filters with higher ratings not only remove more particles from the air, but they also remove smaller particles.

=== Heating, ventilation, and air conditioning ===
HEPA filter effect inside home HVAC system: without (OUTdoor) and with filter (INdoor)

Heating, ventilation, and air conditioning (HVAC) is technology that uses air filters, such as HEPA filters, to remove pollutants from the air either indoors or in vehicles. Pollutants include smoke, viruses, powders, etc., and can originate either outside or inside. HVAC is used to provide environmental comfort and in polluted cities to maintain health.

=== Vehicles ===
==== Airlines ====
Modern airliners use HEPA filters to reduce the spread of airborne pathogens in recirculated air. Critics have expressed concern about the effectiveness and state of repair of air filtering systems, since they think that much of the air in an airplane cabin is recirculated. Almost all of the air in a pressurised aircraft is, in fact, brought in from the outside, circulated through the cabin and then exhausted through outflow valves in the rear of the aircraft. About 40 percent of the cabin's air goes through a HEPA filter and the other 60 percent comes from outside the plane. Certified air filters block and capture 99.97 percent of airborne particles.

==== Motor vehicles ====
In 2016, it was announced that the Tesla Model X would have the world's first HEPA-grade filter in a Tesla car. Following the release of the Model X, Tesla has updated the Model S to also have an optional HEPA air filter.

== History ==
The idea behind the development of the HEPA filter was born from gas masks worn by soldiers fighting in World War II. A piece of paper found inserted into a German gas mask had a remarkably high capture efficiency for chemical smoke. The British Army Chemical Corps duplicated this and began to manufacture it in large quantities for their own service gas masks. They needed another solution for operational headquarters, where individual gas masks were impractical. The Army Chemical Corps developed a combination mechanical blower and air purifier unit, which incorporated cellulose-asbestos paper in a deeply-pleated form with spacers between the pleats. It was referred to as an "absolute" air filter and laid the groundwork for further research to come in developing the HEPA filter.

The next phase of the HEPA filter was designed in the 1940s and was used in the Manhattan Project to prevent the spread of airborne radioactive contaminants. The US Army Chemical Corps and National Defense Research Committee needed to develop a filter suitable for removing radioactive materials from the air. The Army Chemical Corps asked Nobel Laureate Irving Langmuir to recommend filter test methods and other general recommendations for creating the material to filter out these radioactive particles. He identified 0.3 micron size particles to be the "most penetrating size"—the most difficult and concerning.

It was commercialised in the 1950s, and the original term became a registered trademark and later a generic trademark for highly efficient filters.

Over the decades filters have evolved to satisfy the higher and higher demands for air quality in various high technology industries, such as aerospace, pharmaceutical industry, hospitals, health care, nuclear fuels, nuclear power, and integrated circuit fabrication.

== See also ==
- Air purifier – Device that removes contaminants from the air in a room
- Clean air delivery rate – Filtration efficacy measurement
- Cleanroom – Dust-free room for research or production
- Electrostatic precipitator – Filtration device – trap particles with high voltage
- Hypoallergenic vacuum cleaner – vacuum cleaner with high efficiency air filter
- Minimum efficiency reporting value – Measurement scale for the effectiveness of air filters (MERV)
- Respirator – Device worn to protect the user from inhaling contaminants
- ULPA – Type of air filter – Removes 99.999% of dust, pollen, mould, bacteria, and particles larger than 120 nm (0.12 μm)
- Ultraviolet germicidal irradiation – Disinfection method using ultraviolet light
- Corsi–Rosenthal Box – Air purifier design
