= Vacuum cleaner =

Device that sucks up dirt from a surface

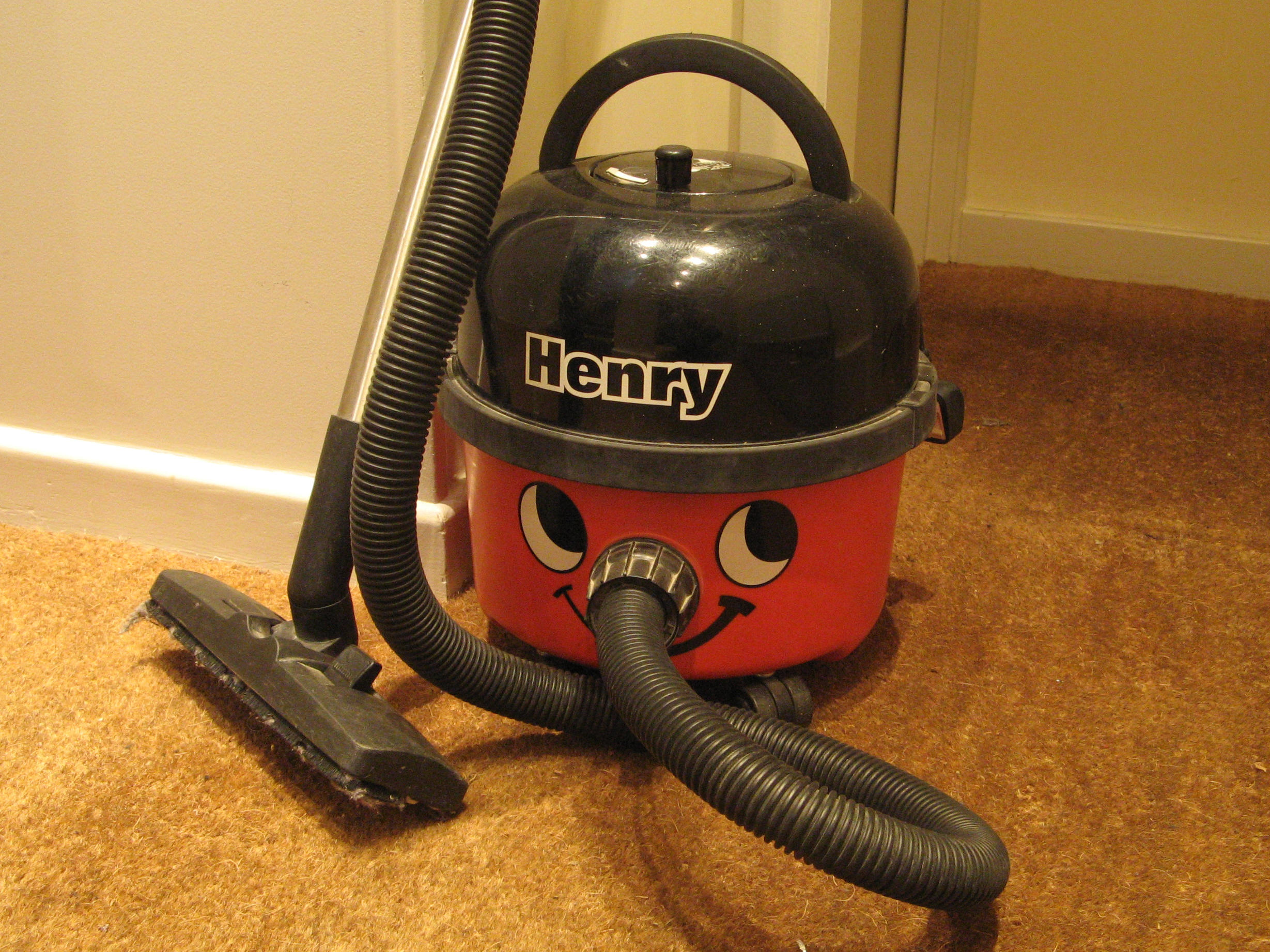
A Numatic Henry, one of the most common canister-style cleaners in the United Kingdom

A vacuum cleaner, also known simply as a vacuum (or a hoover in the UK), is a device that uses suction, and often agitation, in order to remove dirt and other debris from carpets, hard floors, and other surfaces.

The dirt is collected into a dust bag or a plastic bin. Vacuum cleaners, which are used in homes and in commercial settings, exist in a variety of sizes and types, including stick vacuums, handheld vacuums, upright vacuums, canister vacuums, and robot vacuums. Specialized shop vacuums can be used to clean both solid debris and liquids.

== Name ==
Although vacuum cleaner and the short form vacuum are neutral names, in some countries (UK, Ireland) hoover is used instead as a genericized trademark, and as a verb. The name comes from the Hoover Company, one of the first and most influential companies in the development of the device. In New Zealand, particularly the Southland region, it is sometimes called a lux, likewise a genericized trademark and used as a verb. The device is also sometimes called a sweeper although the same term also refers to a carpet sweeper, a similar invention.

== History ==
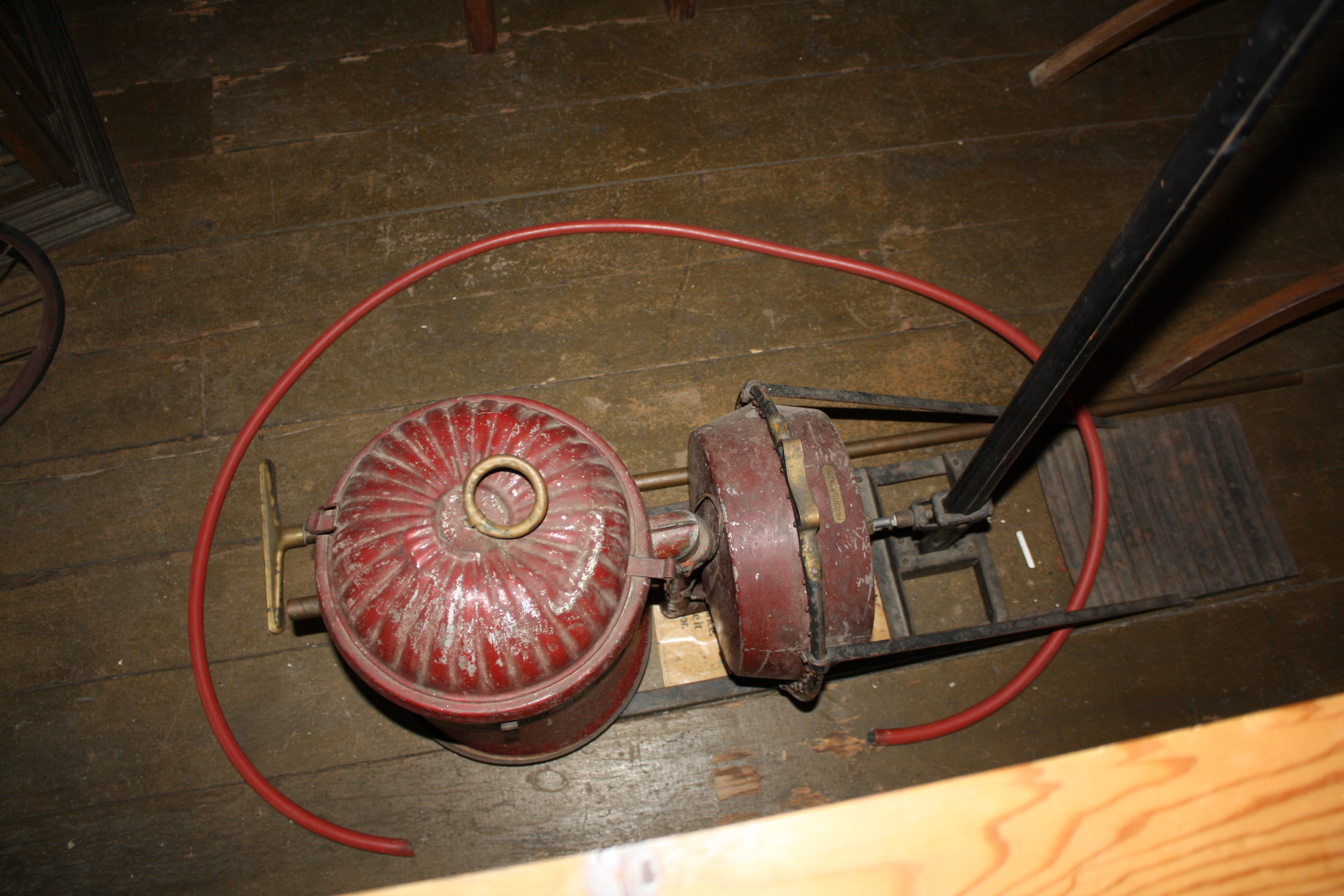
An early hand-pumped vacuum cleaner

The vacuum cleaner evolved from the carpet sweeper via manual vacuum cleaners. The first manual models, using bellows, were developed in the 1860s, and the first motorized designs appeared at the turn of the 20th century, with the first decade being the boom decade.

=== Manual vacuums ===
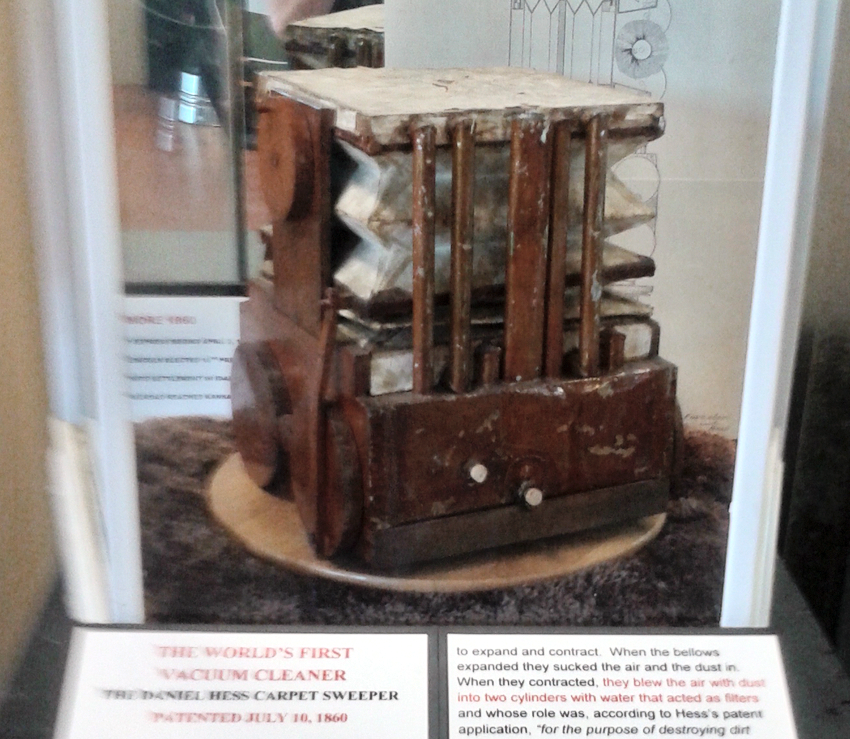
Patent model of Daniel Hess's carpet sweeper

In 1860, a manual vacuum cleaner was invented by Daniel Hess of West Union, Iowa. Called a "carpet sweeper," it gathered dust with a rotating brush and had bellows for generating suction. Another early model was the "Whirlwind", invented in Chicago in 1868 by Ives W. McGaffey. The bulky device worked with a belt-driven fan cranked by hand that made it awkward to operate, although it was commercially marketed with mixed success. A similar model was constructed by Melville R. Bissell of Grand Rapids, Michigan in 1876, who also manufactured carpet sweepers. The company later added portable vacuum cleaners to its line of cleaning tools.

=== Powered vacuum cleaners ===
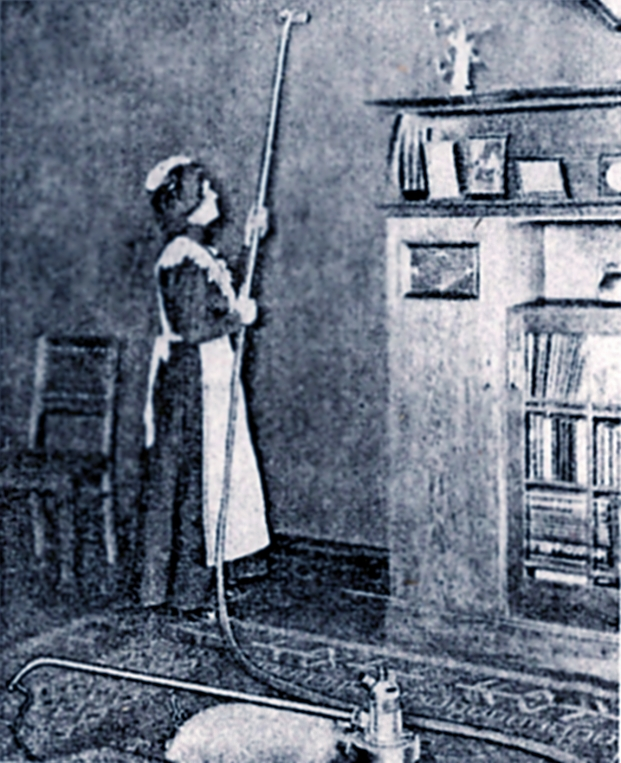
Housemaid using "dedusting pump", c. 1906

The end of the 19th century saw the introduction of powered cleaners, although early types used some variation of blowing air to clean instead of suction. One appeared in 1898 when John S. Thurman of St. Louis, Missouri, submitted a patent (U.S. No. 634,042) for a "pneumatic carpet renovator" which blew dust into a receptacle. Thurman's system, powered by an internal combustion engine, traveled to the customer's residence on a horse-drawn wagon as part of a door-to-door cleaning service. Corrine Dufour of Savannah, Georgia, received two patents in 1899 and 1900 for another blown-air system that seems to have featured the first use of an electric motor.

In 1901, powered vacuum cleaners using suction were invented independently by British engineer Hubert Cecil Booth and American inventor David T. Kenney. Booth also may have coined the word "vacuum cleaner". Booth's horse-drawn combustion-engine-powered "Puffing Billy", maybe derived from Thurman's blown-air design, relied upon just suction with air pumped through a cloth filter and was offered as part of his cleaning services. Kenney's was a stationary 4,000 lb (1,800 kg) steam-engine-powered system with pipes and hoses reaching into all parts of the building.

=== Domestic vacuum cleaner ===
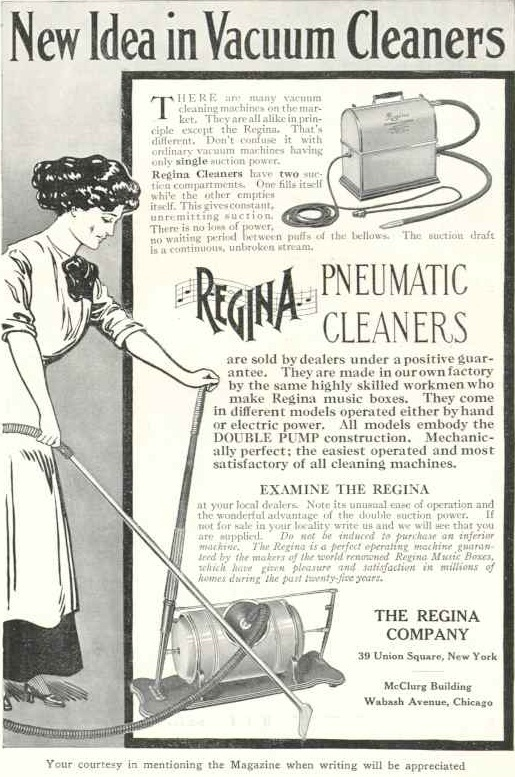
A hand-powered pneumatic vacuum cleaner, c. 1910. An early electric-powered model is also shown.

The first vacuum-cleaning device to be portable and marketed at the domestic market was built in 1905 by Walter Griffiths, a manufacturer in Birmingham, England. His Griffith's Improved Vacuum Apparatus for Removing Dust from Carpets resembled modern-day cleaners; it was portable, easy to store, and powered by "any one person (such as the ordinary domestic servant)", who would have the task of compressing a bellows-like contraption to suck up dust through a removable, flexible pipe, to which a variety of shaped nozzles could be attached.

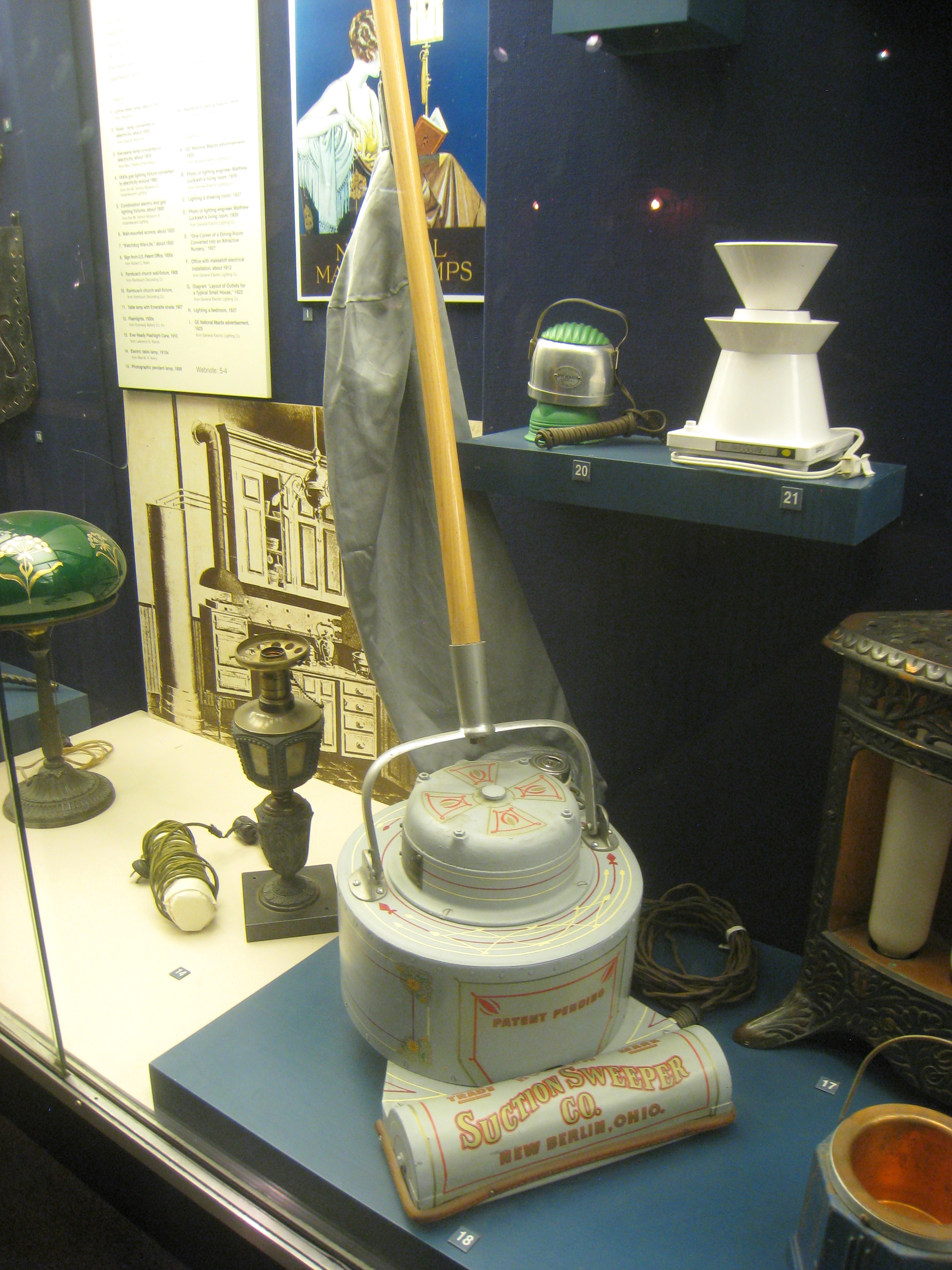
Early electric vacuum cleaner by Electric Suction Sweeper Company, c. 1908

In 1906, James B. Kirby developed his first of many vacuums called the "Domestic Cyclone". It used water for dirt separation. Later revisions became known as the Kirby Vacuum Cleaner. The Cleveland, Ohio factory was built in 1916 and remains open currently, and all Kirby vacuum cleaners are manufactured in the United States.

In 1907 department store janitor James Murray Spangler (1848–1915) of Canton, Ohio, invented the first portable electric vacuum cleaner, obtaining a patent for the Electric Suction Sweeper on 2 June 1908. In addition to suction from an electric fan that blew the dirt and dust into a soap box and one of his wife's pillowcases, Spangler's design utilized a rotating brush to loosen debris. Unable to produce the design himself due to lack of funding, he sold the patent in 1908 to local leather goods manufacturer William Henry Hoover (1849–1932), who had Spangler's machine redesigned with a steel casing, casters, and attachments, founding the company that in 1922 was renamed the Hoover Company. Their first vacuum was the 1908 Model O, which sold for $60 ($2,150 in 2025 dollars). Subsequent innovations included the beater bar in 1919 ("It beats as it sweeps as it cleans"), disposal filter bags in the 1920s, and an upright vacuum cleaner in 1926.

In Continental Europe, the Fisker and Nielsen company in Denmark was the first to sell vacuum cleaners in 1910. The design weighed just 17.5 kg (39 lb) and could be operated by a single person. The Swedish company Electrolux launched their Model V in 1921 with the innovation of being able to lie on the floor on two thin metal runners. In the 1930s the German company Vorwerk started marketing vacuum cleaners of their own design which they sold through direct sales.

=== Post-Second World War ===
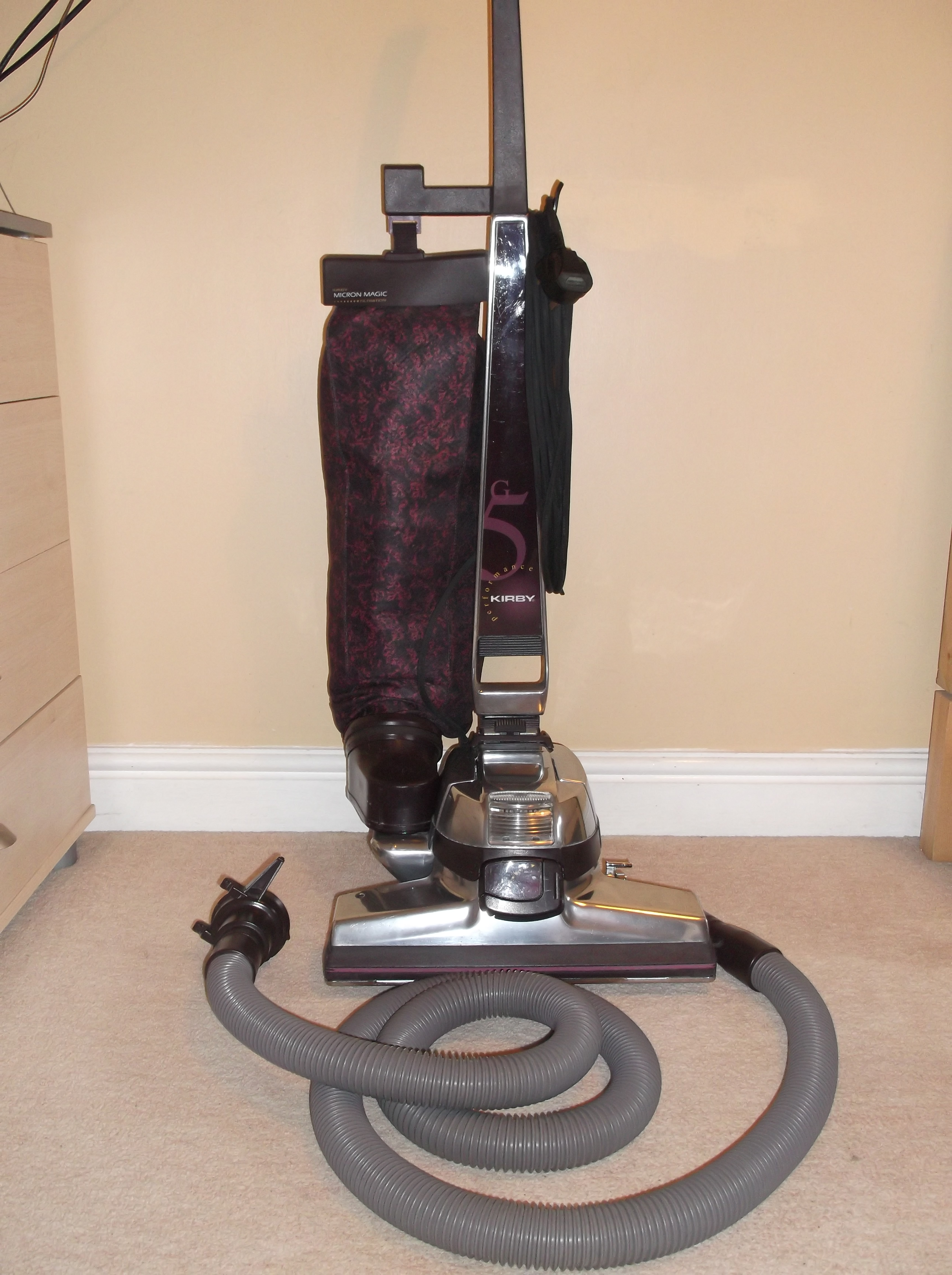
A Kirby G5 vacuum cleaner

For many years after their introduction, vacuum cleaners remained a luxury item, but after the Second World War, they became common among the middle classes. Vacuums tend to be more common in Western countries, because in most other parts of the world, wall-to-wall carpeting is uncommon and homes have tile or hardwood floors, which are easily swept, wiped, or mopped manually without power assist.

The last decades of the 20th century saw the more widespread use of technologies developed earlier, including filterless cyclonic dirt separation, central vacuum systems, and rechargeable hand-held vacuums. In addition, miniaturized computer technology and improved batteries allowed the development of a new type of machine—the autonomous robotic vacuum cleaner. In 1997, Electrolux of Sweden demonstrated the Electrolux Trilobite, the first autonomous cordless robotic vacuum cleaner on the BBC-TV program Tomorrow's World, and introduced it to the consumer market in 2001.

=== Recent developments ===
- In 2004, a British company released AiRider, a hovering vacuum cleaner that floats on a cushion of air similar to a hovercraft, to make it lightweight and easier to maneuver (compared to using wheels).
- A British inventor has developed a new cleaning technology known as Air Recycling Technology, which, instead of using a vacuum, uses an air stream to collect dust from the carpet. This technology was tested by the Market Transformation Programme (MTP) and shown to be more energy-efficient than the vacuum method. Although working prototypes exist, Air Recycling Technology is not currently used in production cleaners.

== Modern configurations ==
A wide variety of technologies, designs, and configurations are available for both domestic and commercial cleaning jobs.

=== Upright ===
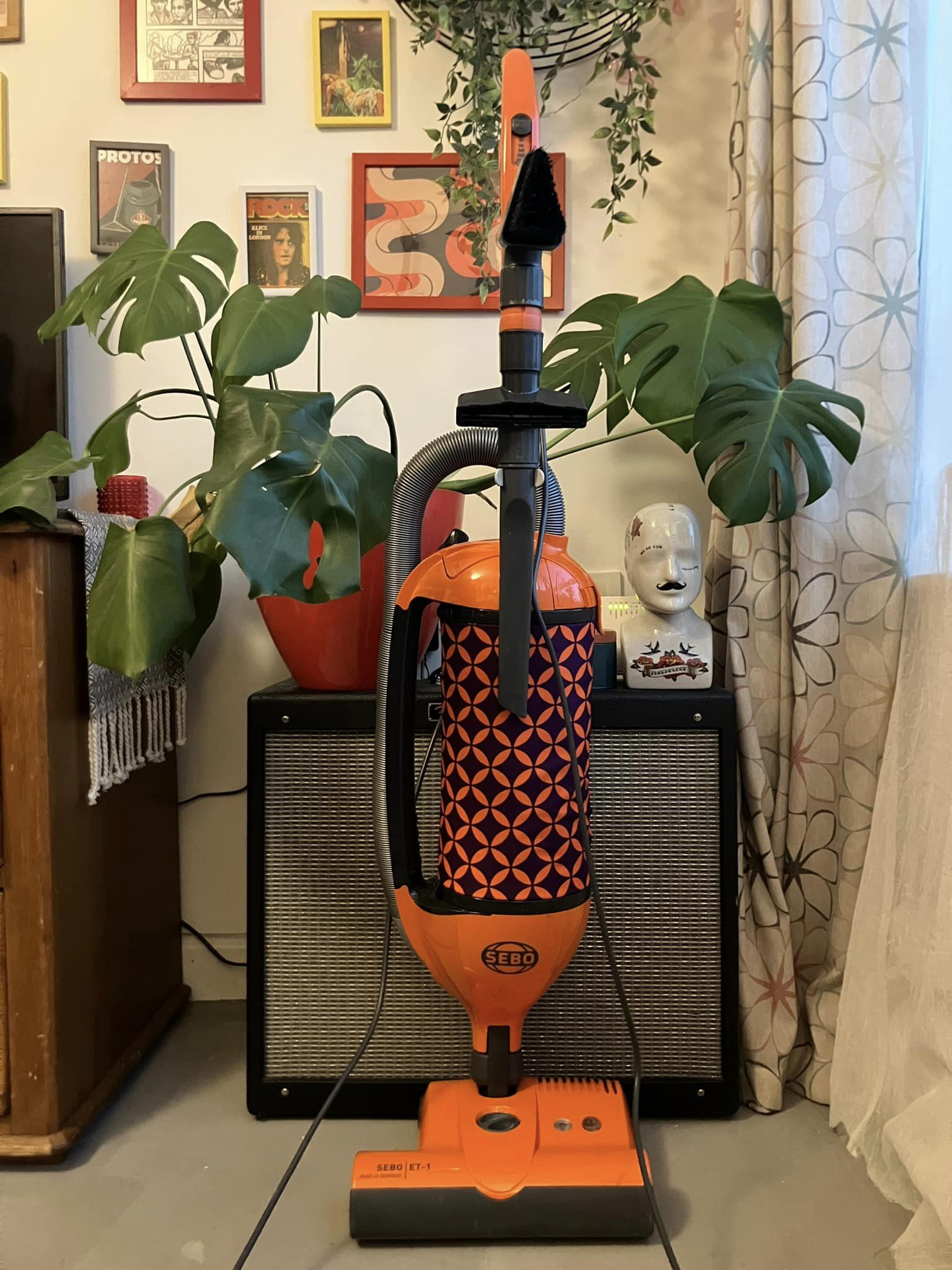
A Sebo Felix 'Fun'. This machine is an example of a 'bypass' cleaner.

Upright vacuum cleaners were not only popular in the US, UK, and numerous Commonwealth countries, but also in some Continental European countries like Germany (where the ″Kobold″ was introduced by Vorwerk). They take the form of a cleaning head, onto which a handle and bag are attached. Upright designs generally employ a rotating brushroll or beater bar, which removes dirt through a combination of sweeping and vibration. There are two types of upright vacuums; dirty-air/direct fan (found mostly on commercial vacuums), or clean-air/fan-bypass (found on most of today's domestic vacuums).

The older of the two designs, direct-fan cleaners have a large impeller (fan) mounted close to the suction opening, through which the dirt passes directly, before being blown into a bag. The motor is often cooled by a separate cooling fan. Because of their large-bladed fans, and comparatively short airpaths, direct-fan cleaners create a very efficient airflow from a low amount of power, and make effective carpet cleaners. Their "above-floor" cleaning power is less efficient, since the airflow is lost when it passes through a long hose, and the fan has been optimized for airflow volume and not suction.

Fan-bypass uprights have their motor mounted after the filter bag. Dust is removed from the airstream by the bag, and usually a filter, before it passes through the fan. The fans are smaller, and are usually a combination of several moving and stationary turbines working in sequence to boost power. The motor is cooled by the airstream passing through it. Fan-bypass vacuums are good for both carpet and above-floor cleaning, since their suction does not significantly diminish over the distance of a hose, as it does in direct-fan cleaners. However, their air-paths are much less efficient, and can require more than twice as much power as direct-fan cleaners to achieve the same results.

The most common upright vacuum cleaners use a drive-belt powered by the suction motor to rotate the brush-roll. However, a more common design of dual motor upright is available. In these cleaners, the suction is provided via a large motor, while the brushroll is powered by a separate, smaller motor, which does not create any suction. The brush-roll motor can sometimes be switched off, so hard floors can be cleaned without the brush-roll scattering the dirt. It may also have an automatic cut-off feature which shuts the motor off if the brush-roll becomes jammed, protecting it from damage.

=== Canister ===
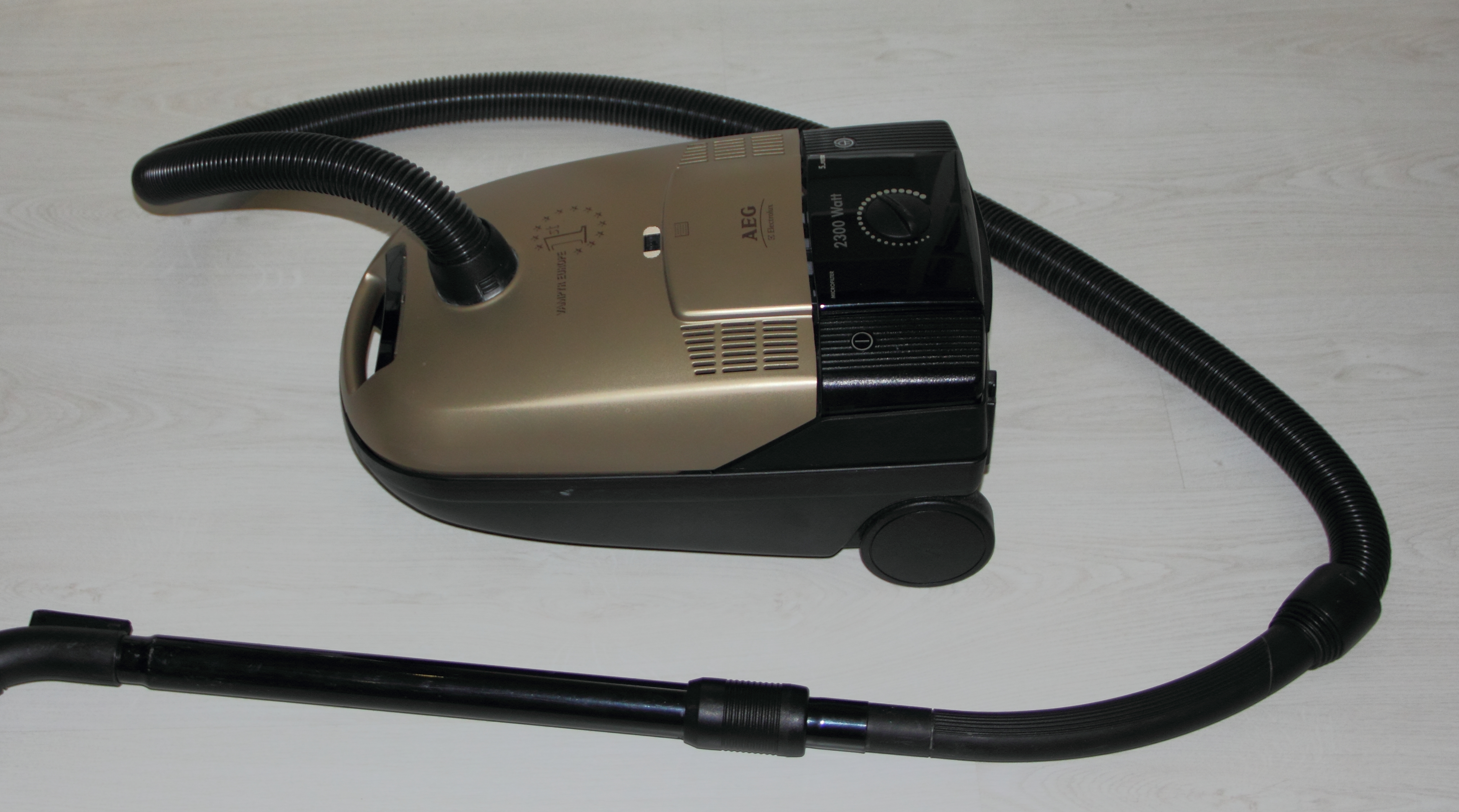
A 1990s AEG canister, popular in Europe

Canister models (in the UK also often called cylinder models) dominate the European market. They have the motor and dust collectors (using a bag or bagless) in a separate unit, usually mounted on wheels, which is connected to the vacuum head by a flexible hose. Their main advantage is flexibility, as the user can attach different heads for different tasks, and maneuverability (the head can reach under furniture and makes it very easy to vacuum stairs and vertical surfaces). Many cylinder models have power heads as standard or add-on equipment containing the same sort of mechanical beaters as in upright units, making them as efficient on carpets as upright models. Such beaters are driven by a separate electric motor or a turbine which uses the suction power to spin the brushroll via a drive belt.

=== Drum ===
Drum or shop vac models are essentially heavy-duty industrial versions of cylinder vacuum cleaners, where the canister consists of a large vertically positioned drum which can be stationary or on wheels. Smaller versions, for use in garages or small workshops, are usually electrically powered. Larger models, which can store over 200 litres (44 imp gal; 53 US gal), are often hooked up to compressed air, utilizing the Venturi effect to produce a partial vacuum. Built-in dust collection systems are also used in many workshops.

=== Wet/dry ===
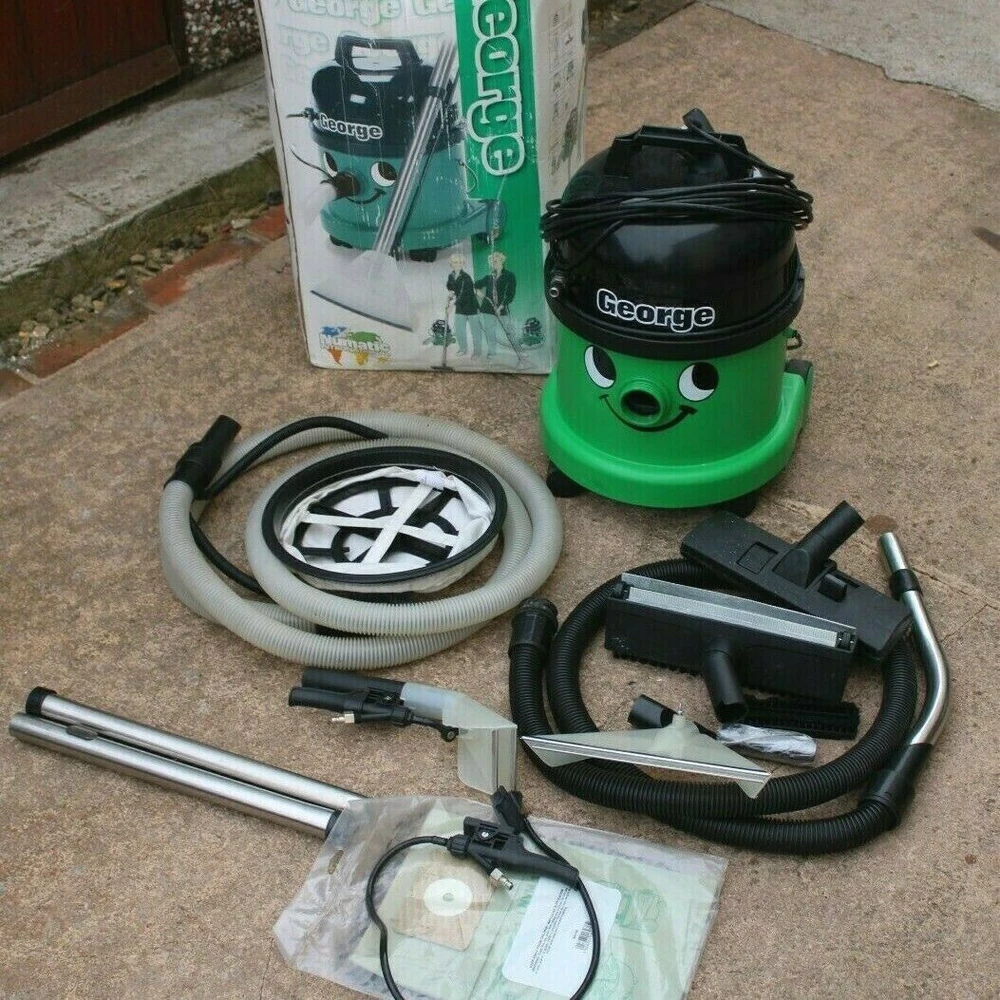
A 'George' Wet & Dry vacuum cleaner

Wet or wet/dry vacuum cleaners are specialized type in a cylindrical drum or portable canister form that can be used to clean up wet or liquid spills. They are generally designed to be used both indoors and outdoors and to accommodate both wet and dry debris; some are also equipped with an exhaust port or detachable blower for reversing the airflow, a useful function for everything from clearing a clogged hose to blowing dust into a corner for easy collection.

Commonly referred to as a "shop vac" (for the generic trademark derived from the Shop-Vac brand), this type is able to collect large, bulky, or otherwise inconvenient material that would damage or foul household vacuum cleaners, like sawdust, swarf, and liquids.

They use wide hoses, which open directly into the collection chamber (usually a bucket-like cylinder constituting the body of the vacuum). As the airstream enters the larger volume, its flow slows down, allowing the material to drop into the chamber before air is sucked out through the filter and to the vacuum's exhaust.

Shop vacs' performance can be evaluated by a number of metrics. Commonly used ones include the motor's rating (using power measurements like watts or horsepower), the vacuum's ability to develop suction (using pressure measurements like inches of water), and total airflow through the system (using volume rate measurements like cubic feet per minute).

Related to the wet vacuum is the extraction vacuum cleaner used mainly in hot water extraction, a method of cleaning hard-to-move pieces of fabric like carpets. These machines spray hot soapy water on-demand and then suck it back out of the fabric, removing dirt in the process.

Wet vacuum cleaners have been modified by end users, adding an internally mounted sump pump for continuous removal of liquids without having to stop to empty the tank.

=== Pneumatic ===
Pneumatic or pneumatic wet/dry vacuum cleaners are a specialized form of wet/dry models that hook up to compressed air. They commonly can accommodate both wet and dry soilage, a useful feature in industrial plants and manufacturing facilities.

=== Backpack ===
Backpack vacuum cleaners are commonly used for commercial cleaning: they allow the user to move rapidly about a large area. They are essentially small canister vacuums strapped onto the user's back.

=== Hand-held ===
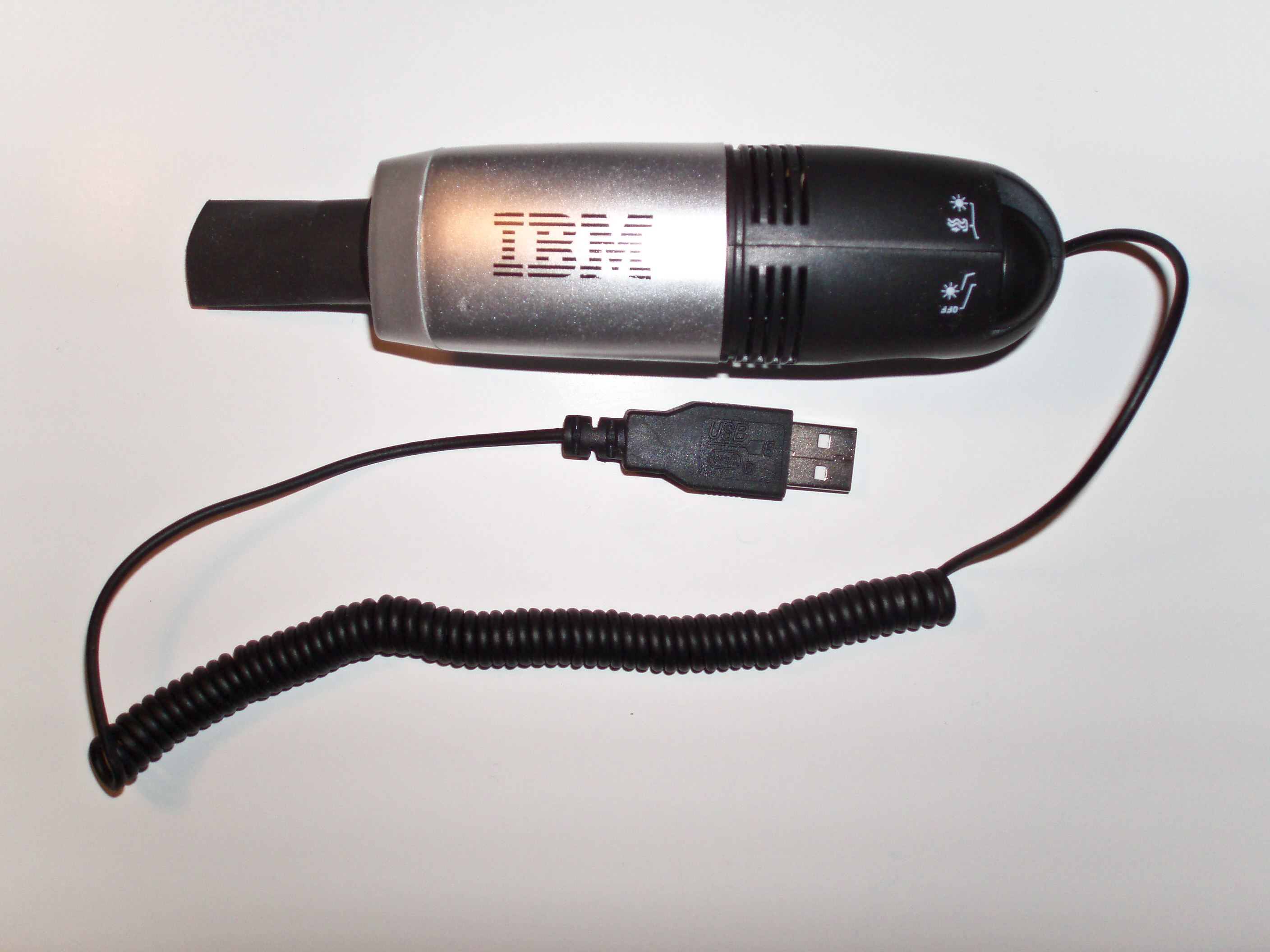
USB-powered hand-held vacuum cleaner

Lightweight hand-held vacuum cleaners, either powered from rechargeable batteries or mains power, are also popular for cleaning up smaller spills. Frequently seen examples include the Black & Decker DustBuster, which was introduced in 1979, and numerous handheld models by Dirt Devil, which were first introduced in 1984. Some battery-powered handheld vacuums are wet/dry rated; the appliance must be partially disassembled and cleaned after picking up wet materials to avoid developing unpleasant odors.

=== Pile lifter ===
A pile lifter or pile brush is a vacuum cleaner-like device used in the manufacture of carpets and in heavy-duty carpet cleaning. The motors, brushes, and belts of a pile lifter are much stronger than those found in traditional vacuum cleaners, and their brushes are denser with bristles that extend to the carpet backing for removal of embedded particles. They resemble upright vacuum cleaners and are often equipped with two motors. The combination of agitation from the brushes and suction from vacuums removes embedded soil, but frequent use is noted to dramatically alter the appearance of a carpet. The device was invented by the Certified Chemical & Equipment Company in the 1950s and was produced by modifying an upright floor sanding machine.

Pile lifters may also lift and straighten the carpet fibers from the base and align the piles with special needles to prepare them for shearing. A device known as a pile lifter employed in textile manufacturing generates a static charge to raise or "lift" piles that are compressed during a drying process.

=== Robotic ===
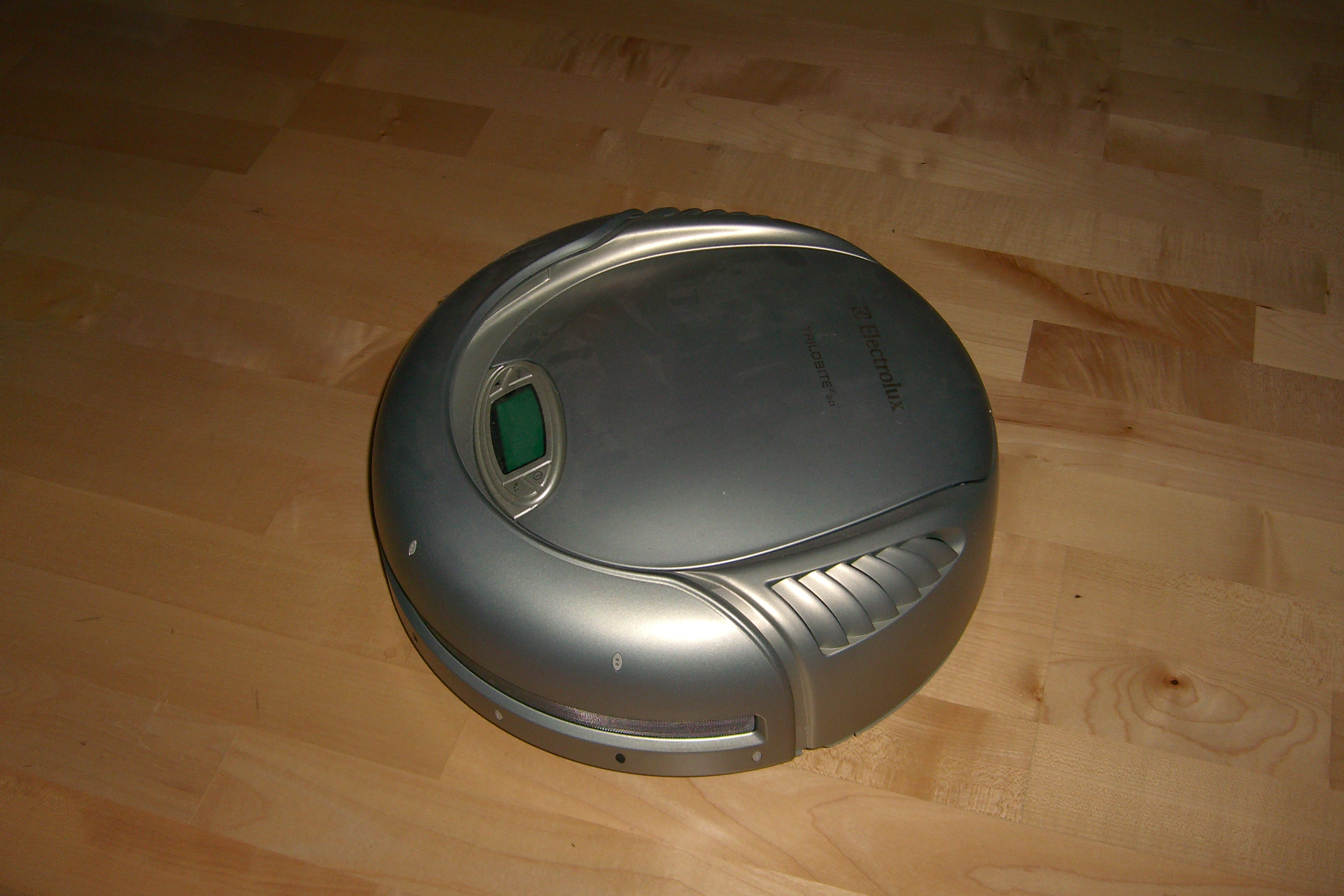
The Electrolux Trilobite was the first mass-produced robotic vacuum cleaner.

In the late 1990s and early 2000s, several companies developed robotic vacuum cleaners, a form of carpet sweeper usually equipped with limited suction power. Some prominent brands are Roomba, Neato, and bObsweep. These machines move autonomously while collecting surface dust and debris into a dustbin. They can usually navigate around furniture and come back to a docking station to charge their batteries, and a few are able to empty their dust containers into the dock as well. Most models are equipped with motorized brushes and a vacuum motor to collect dust and debris. While most robotic vacuum cleaners are designed for home use, some models are appropriate for operation in offices, hotels, hospitals, etc.

In December 2009, Neato Robotics launched the world's first robotic vacuum cleaner which uses a rotating laser-based range-finder (a form of lidar) to scan and map its surrounding. It uses this map to clean the floor methodically, even if it requires the robot to return to its base multiple times to recharge itself. In many cases it will notice when an area of the floor that was previously inaccessible becomes reachable, such as when a dog wakes up from a nap, and return to vacuum that area.

=== Cyclonic ===
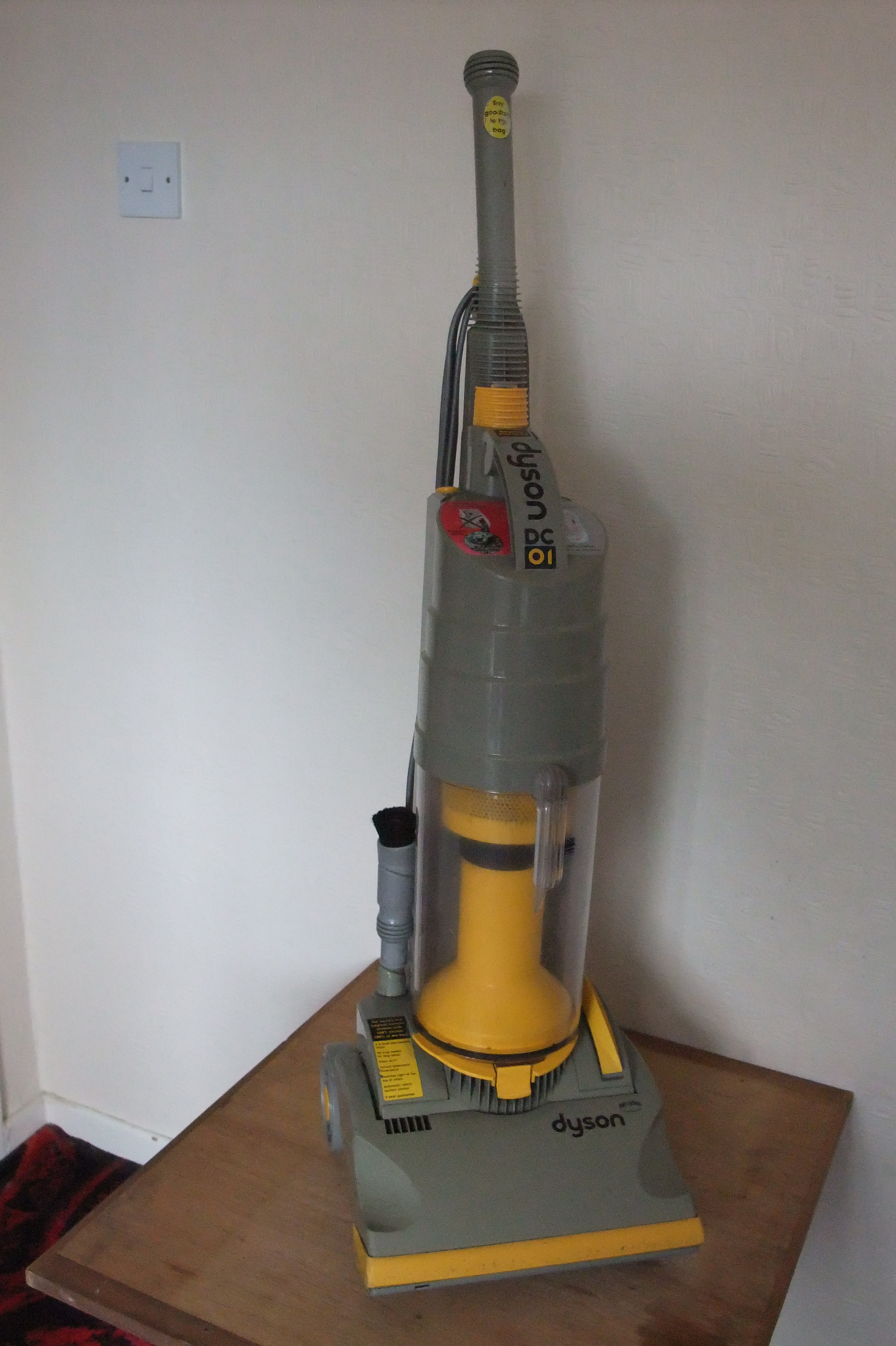
The Dyson DC01 was released in the UK in 1993.

Portable vacuum cleaners working on the cyclonic separation principle became popular in the 1990s. This dirt separation principle was well known and often used in central vacuum systems. Cleveland's P.A. Geier Company had obtained a patent on a cyclonic vacuum cleaner as early as 1928, which was later sold to Health-Mor in 1939, introducing the Filter Queen cyclonic canister vacuum cleaner.

In 1979, James Dyson introduced a portable unit with cyclonic separation, adapting this design from industrial saw mills. He launched his cyclone cleaner first in Japan in the 1980s at a cost of about US$1800 and in 1993 released the Dyson DC01 upright in the UK for £200. Critics expected that people would not buy a vacuum cleaner at twice the price of a conventional unit, but the Dyson design later became the most popular cleaner in the UK.

Cyclonic cleaners do not use filtration bags. Instead, the dust is separated in a detachable cylindrical collection vessel or bin. Air and dust are sucked at high speed into the collection vessel at a direction tangential to the vessel wall, creating a fast-spinning vortex. The dust particles and other debris move to the outside of the vessel by centrifugal force, where they fall due to gravity.

In fixed-installation central vacuum cleaners, the cleaned air may be exhausted directly outside without need for further filtration. A well-designed cyclonic filtration system loses suction power due to airflow restriction only when the collection vessel is almost full. This is in marked contrast to filter bag systems, which lose suction when pores in the filter become clogged as dirt and dust are collected.

In portable cyclonic models, the cleaned air from the center of the vortex is expelled from the machine after passing through a number of successively finer filters at the top of the container. The first filter is intended to trap particles which could damage the subsequent filters that remove fine dust particles. The filters must regularly be cleaned or replaced to ensure that the machine continues to perform efficiently.

Since Dyson's success in raising public awareness of cyclonic separation, several other companies have introduced cyclone models. Competing manufacturers include Hoover, Bissell, Bosch, Eureka, Electrolux, and Vax. This high level of competition means the cheapest models are generally no more expensive than a conventional cleaner.

=== Central ===
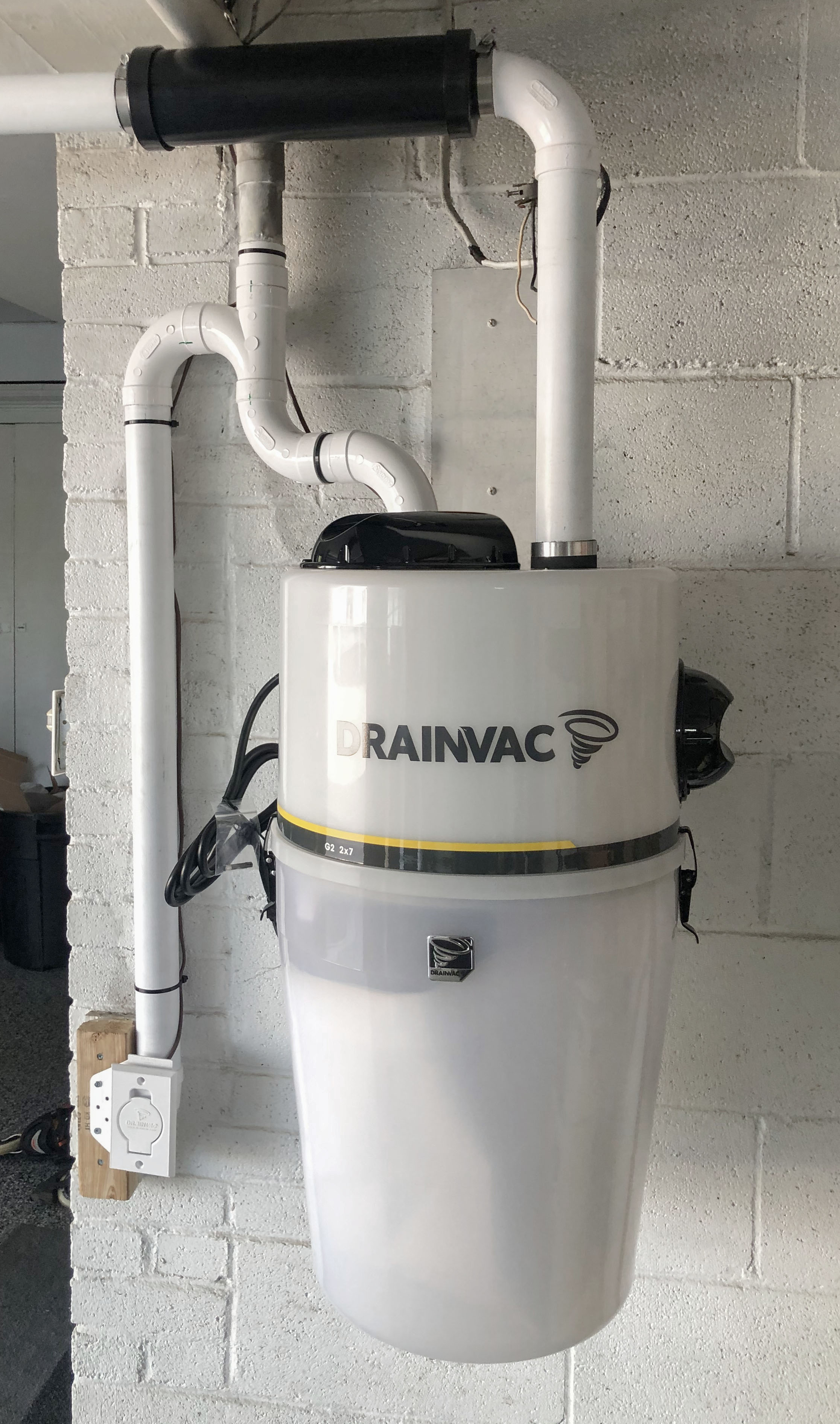
The power unit of a typical central vacuum cleaner for residential use

Central vacuum cleaners, also known as built-in or ducted, are a type of canister/cylinder model which has the motor and dirt filtration unit located in a central location in a building, and connected by pipes to fixed vacuum inlets installed throughout the building. Only the hose and cleaning head need be carried from room to room, and the hose is commonly 8 m (25 ft) long, allowing a large range of movement without changing vacuum inlets. Plastic or metal piping connects the inlets to the central unit. The vacuum head may be unpowered, or have beaters operated by an electric motor or by an air-driven turbine.

The dirt bag or collection bin in a central vacuum system is usually so large that emptying or changing needs to be done less often, perhaps a few times per year for an ordinary household. The central unit usually stays in stand-by, and is turned on by a switch on the handle of the hose. Alternately, the unit powers up when the hose is plugged into the wall inlet, when the metal hose connector makes contact with two prongs in the wall inlet and control current is transmitted through low voltage wires to the main unit.

A central vacuum typically produces greater suction than common portable vacuum cleaners because a larger fan and more powerful motor can be used when they are not required to be portable. A cyclonic separation system, if used, does not lose suction as the collection container fills up, until the container is nearly full. This is in marked contrast to filter-bag designs, which start losing suction immediately as pores in the filter become clogged by accumulated dirt and dust.

A benefit to allergy sufferers is that unlike a standard vacuum cleaner, which must blow some of the dirt collected back into the room being cleaned (no matter how efficient its filtration), a central vacuum removes all the dirt collected to the central unit. Since this central unit is usually located outside the living area, no dust is recirculated back into the room being cleaned. Also it is possible on most newer models to vent the exhaust entirely outside, even with the unit inside the living quarters.

Another benefit of the central vacuum is, because of the remote location of the motor unit, there is much less noise in the room being cleaned than with a standard vacuum cleaner.

=== Constellation ===
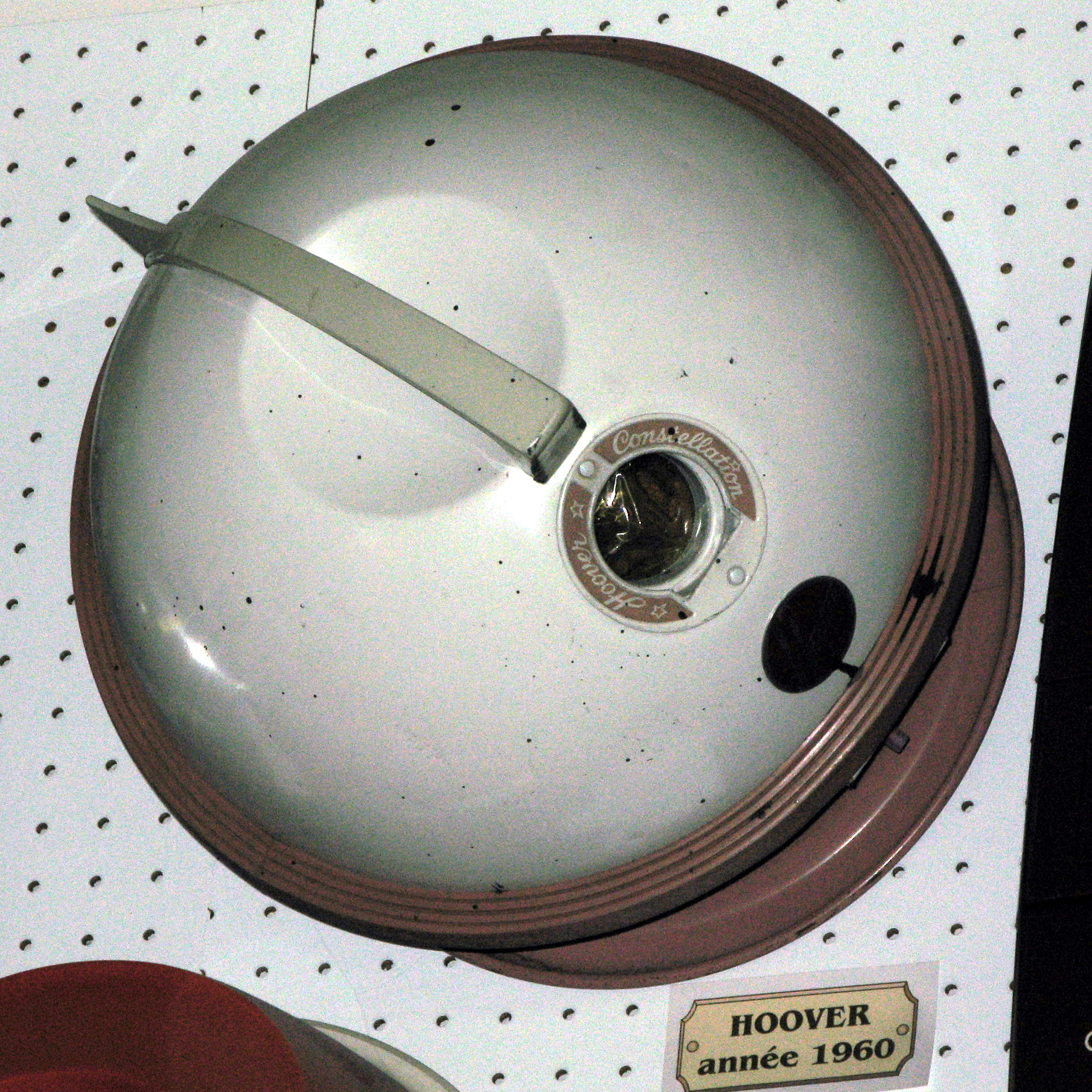
Hoover Constellation of 1960

Introduced in 1954, The Hoover Company's Constellation was of the cylinder type and lacked wheels. Instead the vacuum cleaner floated on its exhaust, operating as a hovercraft, although that was not true of the earliest models, which had a rotating hose, the intention being that the user would place the unit in the center of the room, and work around the cleaner.

The Constellation was changed and updated over the years until discontinued in 1975. Later Constellations routed all of the exhaust under the vacuum using an airfoil. The updated design was quiet even by modern standards, particularly on carpet, because it muffled the sound. Those models float on carpet or bare floor although, on hard flooring, the exhaust air tends to scatter any fluff or debris around.

Hoover re-released an updated version of the later-model Constellation in the US (model # S3341 in Pearl White and # S3345 in stainless steel). Changes included a HEPA filtration bag, a 12-amp motor, a turbine-powered brush roll, and a redesigned version of the handle. The same model was marketed in the UK under the Maytag brand, called the Satellite because of licensing restrictions. It was sold from 2006 to 2009.

=== Vehicles ===
See vacuum truck for very big vacuum cleaners mounted on vehicles.

=== Other ===
Some other vacuum cleaners include an electric mop in the same machine: for a dry and a later wet clean.

The iRobot company developed the Scooba, a robotic wet vacuum cleaner that carries its own cleaning solution, applies it, scrubs the floor, and then vacuums the dirty water into a collection tank.

== Technology ==
A vacuum's suction is caused by a difference in air pressure. A fan driven by an electric motor (often a universal motor) reduces the pressure inside the machine. Atmospheric pressure then pushes the air through the carpet and into the nozzle, and so the dust is literally pushed into the bag.

Tests have shown that vacuuming can kill 100% of young fleas and 96% of adult fleas.

=== Exhaust filtration ===
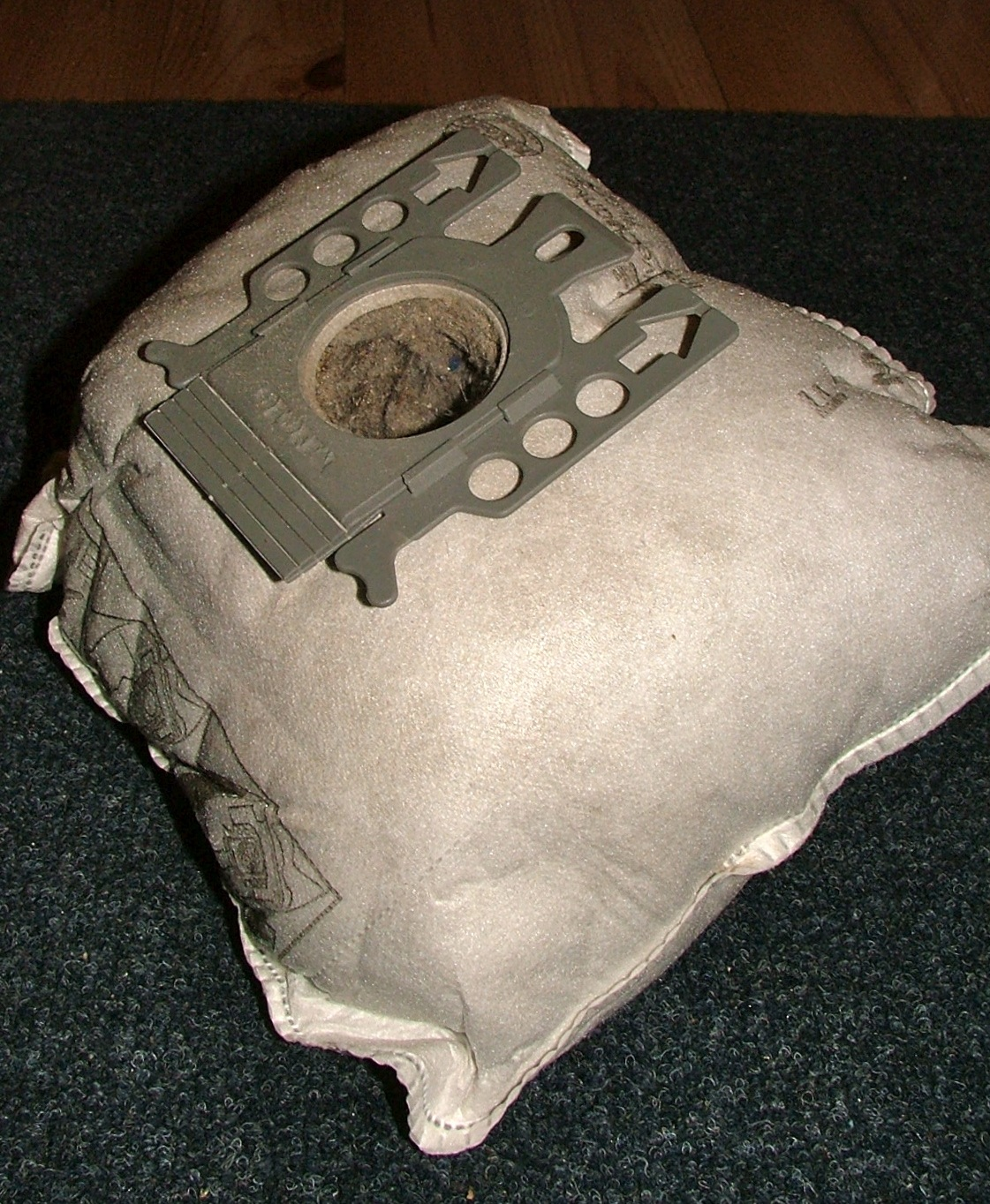
A full dustbag. The frame around the opening fastens to the interior end of the cleaner's hose inlet.

Vacuums by their nature cause dust to become airborne, by exhausting air that is not completely filtered. This can cause health problems since the operator ends up inhaling respirable dust, which is also redeposited into the area being cleaned. There are several methods manufacturers use to control this problem, some of which may be combined in a single appliance. Typically a filter is positioned so that the incoming air passes through it before it reaches the fan, and then the filtered air passes through the motor for cooling purposes. Some other designs use a completely separate air intake for cooling.

It is nearly impossible for a practical air filter to completely remove all ultrafine particles from a dirt-laden airstream. An ultra-efficient air filter will immediately clog up and become ineffective during everyday use, and practical filters are a compromise between filtering effectiveness and restriction of airflow. One way to sidestep this problem is to exhaust partially filtered air to the outdoors, which is a design feature of some central vacuum systems. Specially engineered portable vacuums may also utilize this design, but are more awkward to set up and use, requiring temporary installation of a separate exhaust hose to an exterior window.

- Bag: The most common method to capture the debris vacuumed up involves a paper or fabric bag that allows air to pass through, but attempts to trap most of the dust and debris. The bag may become clogged with fine dust before it is full. The bag may be disposable, or designed to be cleaned and re-used.
- Bagless: In non-cyclonic bagless models, the role of the bag is taken by a removable container and a reusable filter, equivalent to a reusable fabric bag.
- Cyclonic separation: A vacuum cleaner employing this method is also bagless. It causes intake air to be cycled or spun so fast that most of the dust is forced out of the air and falls into a collection bin. The operation is similar to that of a centrifuge. Centrifugal separators eliminate the problem of a bag becoming clogged with fine dust.
- Water filtration: First seen commercially in the 1920s in the form of the Newcombe Separator (later to become the Rexair Rainbow), a water filtration vacuum cleaner uses a water bath as a filter. It forces the dirt-laden intake air to pass through water before it is exhausted, so that wet dust cannot become airborne. The water trap filtration and low speed may also allow the user to use the machine as a stand-alone air purifier and humidifier unit. The dirty water must be dumped out and the appliance must be cleaned after each use, to avoid growth of bacteria and mold, causing unpleasant odors.
- Ultra fine air filter: Also called HEPA filtered, this method is used as a secondary filter after the air has passed through the rest of the machine. It is meant to remove any remaining dust that could harm the operator. Some vacuum cleaners also use an activated charcoal filter to remove odors.

Ordinary vacuum cleaners should never be used to clean up asbestos fibers, even if fitted with a HEPA filter. Specially designed machines are required to safely clean up asbestos.

=== Attachments ===
Most vacuum cleaners are supplied with numerous specialized attachments, such as tools, brushes, and extension wands, which allow them to reach otherwise inaccessible places or to be used for cleaning a variety of surfaces. The most common of these tools are:

- Hard floor brush (for non-upright designs)
- Powered floor nozzle (for canister designs)
- Dusting brush
- Crevice tool
- Upholstery nozzle
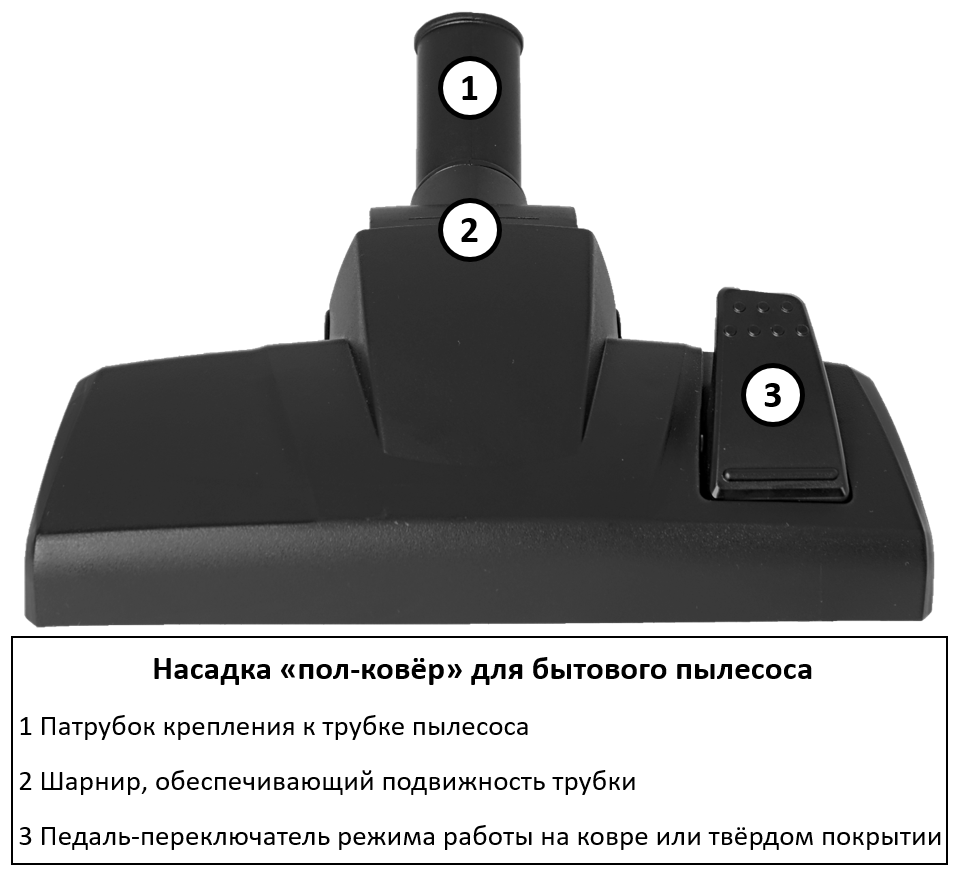
Hard floor brush (for non-upright designs)

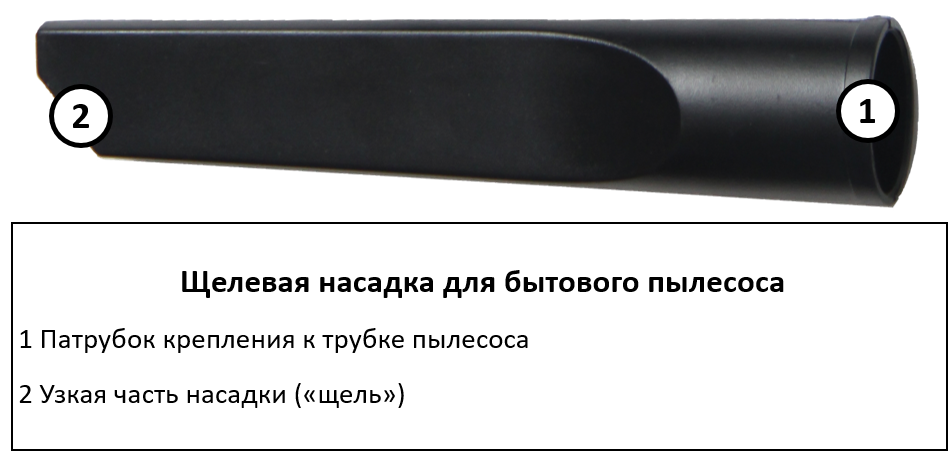
Crevice tool

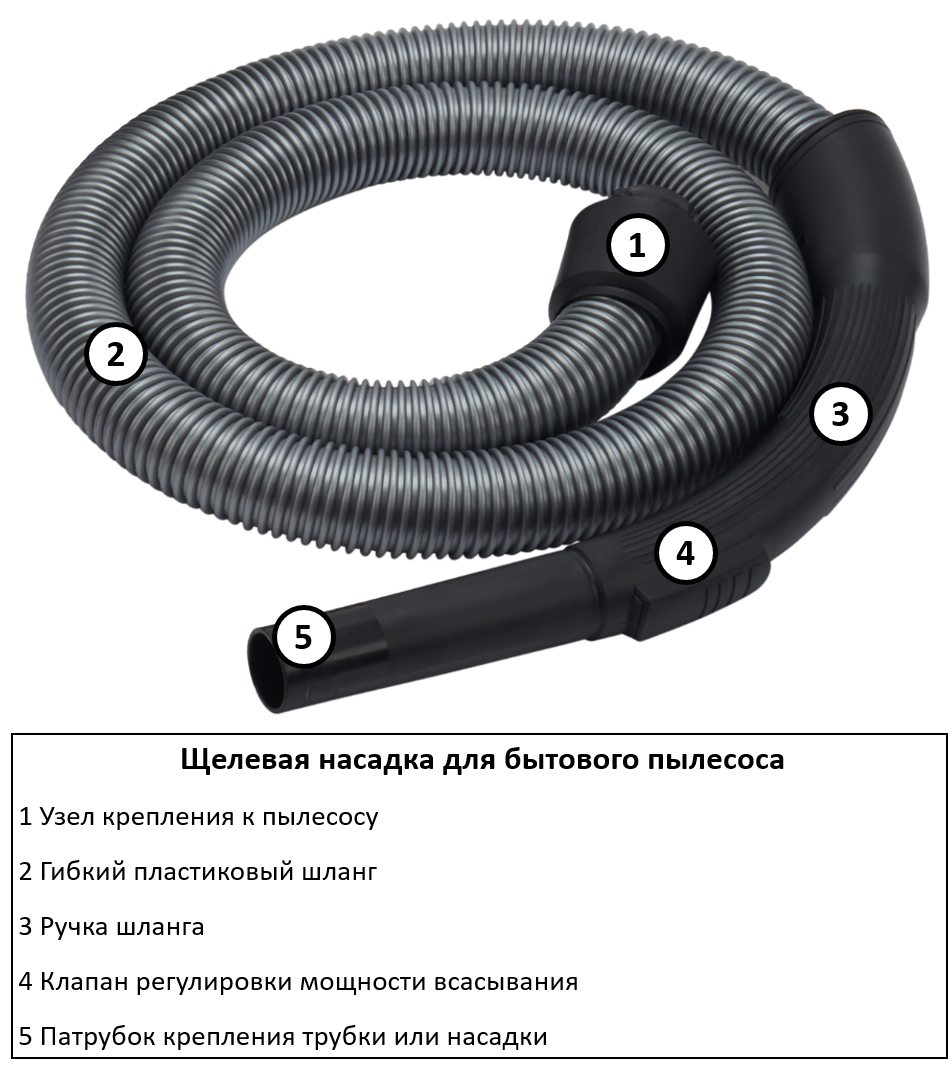
Vacuum hose

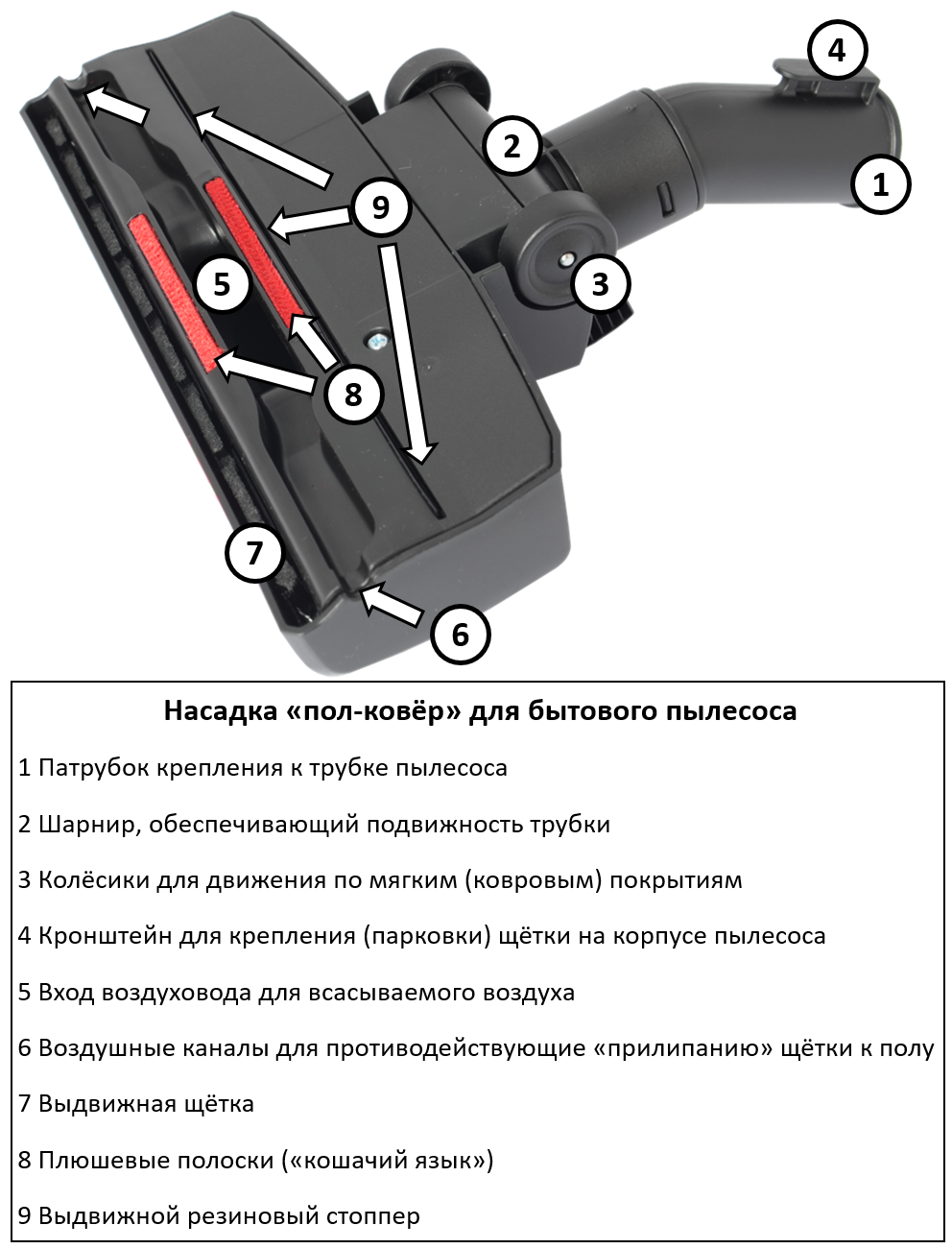
Hard floor brush (for non-upright designs)

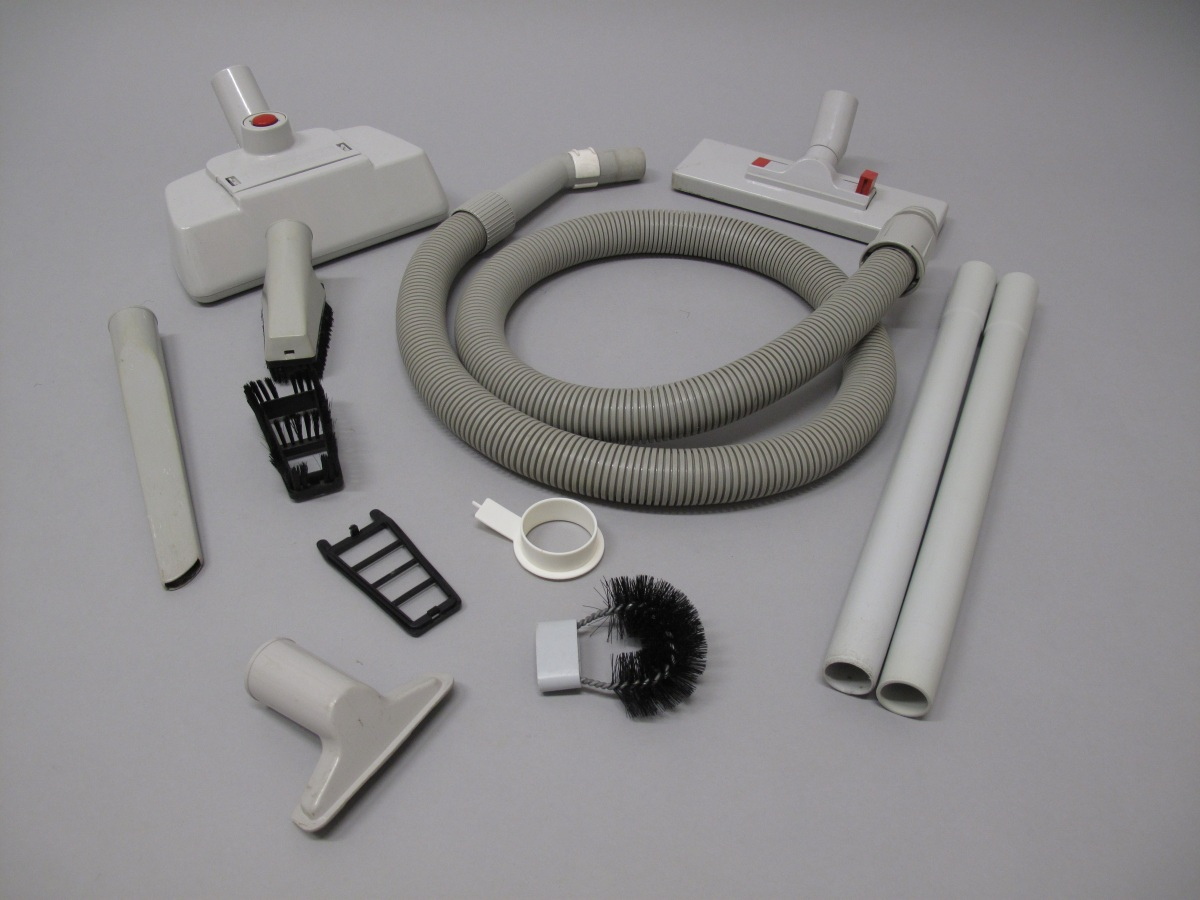
Set of vacuum accessories

=== Specifications ===
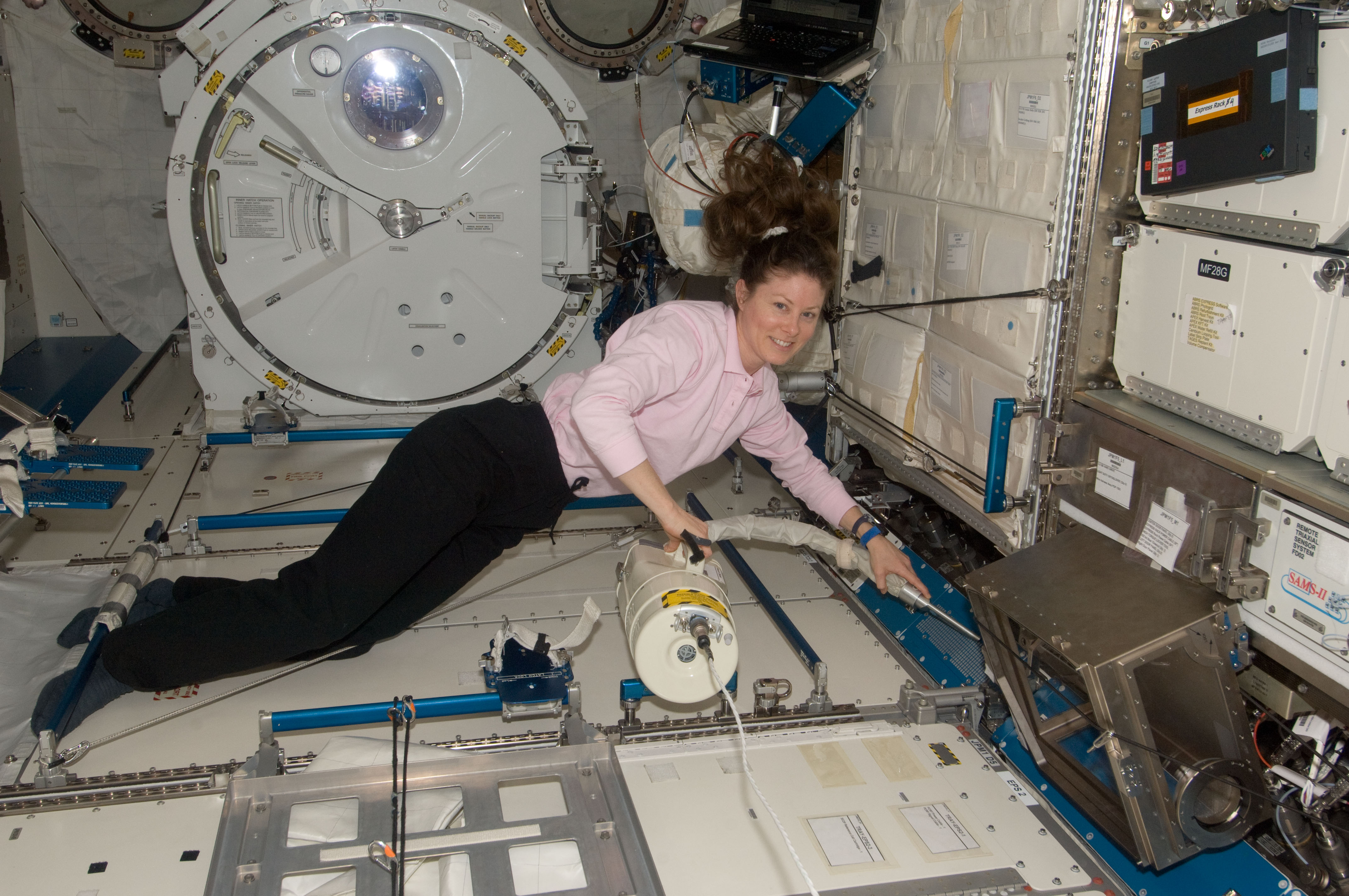
Astronaut Tracy Caldwell Dyson vacuums equipment on the International Space Station.

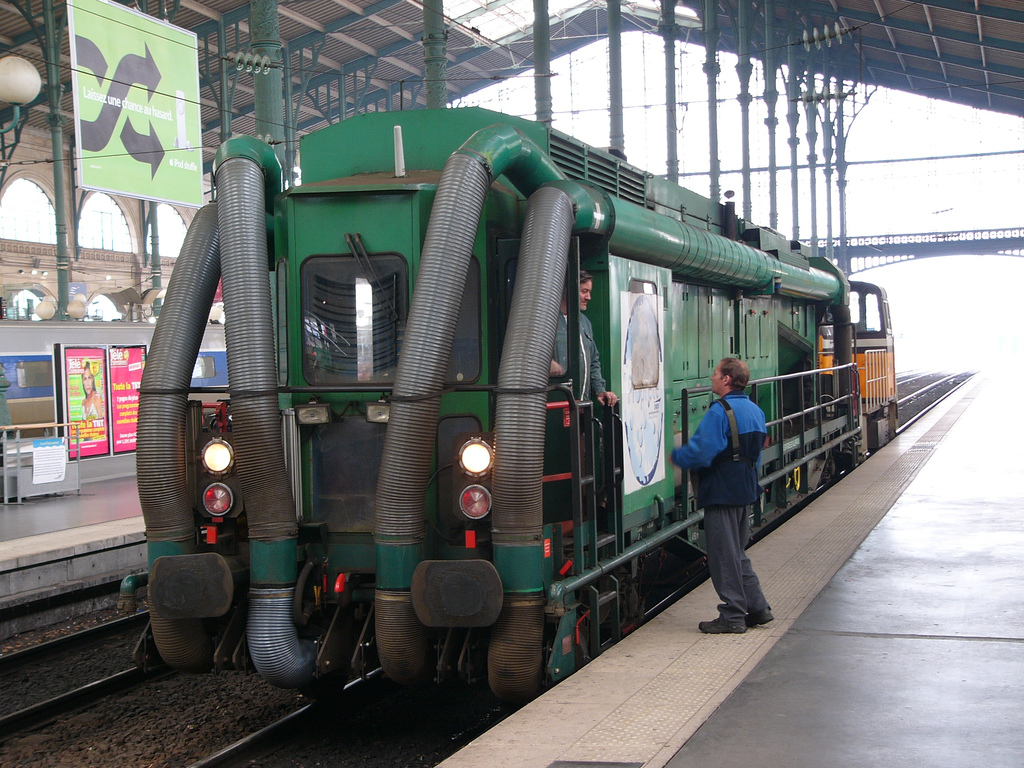
Train-mounted vacuum system for track cleaning (France)

The performance of a vacuum cleaner can be measured by several parameters:

- Airflow, in litres per second [l/s] or cubic feet per minute (CFM or ft^{3}/min)
- Air speed, in metres per second [m/s] or miles per hour [mph]
- Suction, vacuum, or water lift, in pascals [Pa] or inches of water

Other specifications of a vacuum cleaner are:

- Weight, in kilograms [kg] or pounds [lb]
- Noise, in decibels [dB]
- Power cord length and hose length (as applicable)

==== Suction (Pa) ====
The suction is the maximum pressure difference that the pump can create. For example, a typical domestic model has a suction of about negative 20 kPa. This means that it can lower the pressure inside the hose from normal atmospheric pressure (about 100 kPa) by 20 kPa. The higher the suction rating, the more powerful the cleaner. One inch of water is equivalent to about 249 Pa; hence, the typical suction is 80 inches (2,000 mm) of water.

==== Input power (W) ====
The power consumption of a vacuum cleaner, in watts, is often the only figure stated. Many North American vacuum manufacturers give the current only in amperes (e.g. "6 amps"), and the consumer is left to multiply that by the line voltage of 120 volts to get the approximate power ratings in watts. The rated input power does not indicate the effectiveness of the cleaner, only how much electricity it consumes.

After August 2014, due to EU rules, manufacture of vacuum cleaners with a power consumption greater than 1600 watts were banned within the EU, and from 2017 no vacuum cleaner with a wattage greater than 900 watts was permitted.

==== Output power (AW) ====
The amount of input power that is converted into airflow at the end of the cleaning hose is sometimes stated, and is measured in airwatts: the measurement units are simply watts. The word "air" is used to clarify that this is output power, not input electrical power.

The airwatt is derived from English units. ASTM International defines the airwatt as 0.117354 × F × S, where F is the rate of air flow in ft^{3}/min and S is the pressure in inches of water. This makes one airwatt equal to 0.9983 watts.

==== Peak horsepower ====
The peak horsepower of a vacuum cleaner is often measured by removal of any cooling fans and calculating power based on the motor's power plus the rotational inertial energy stored the motor armature and centrifugal blower. A peak horsepower rating is often an impractical figure and is only valid for a very short period. Continuous power is typically far lower.

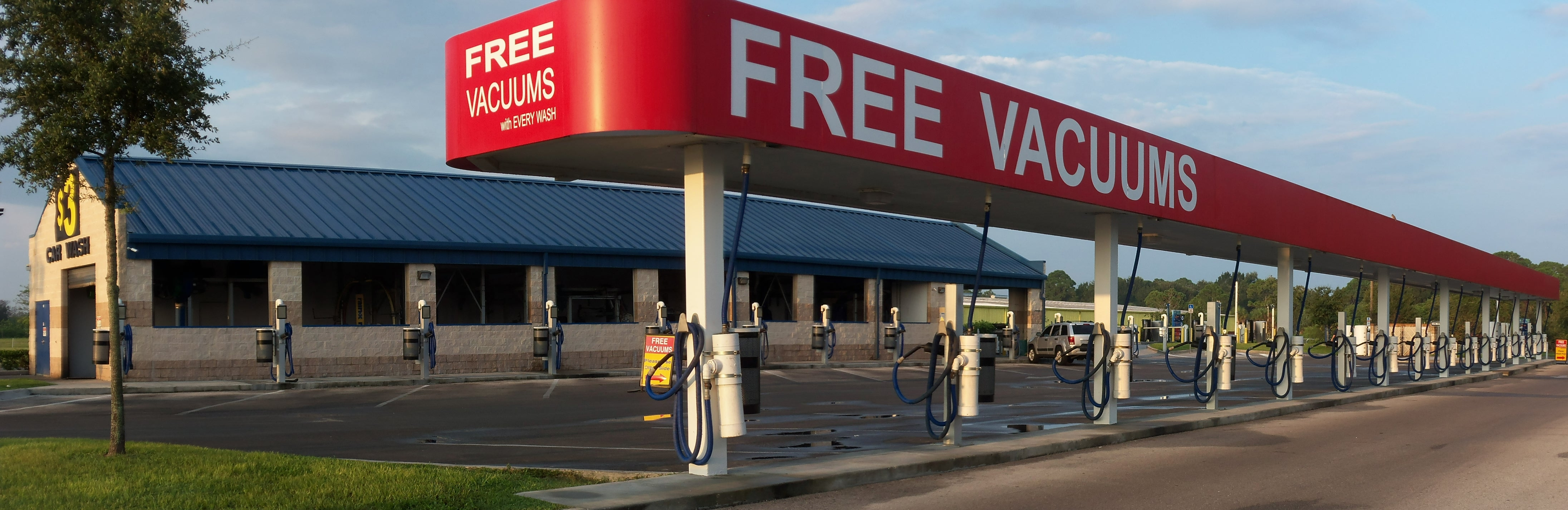
Automotive vacuums in Bayonet Point, Florida. Although the prominent sign says "free", a paid car wash is required first.

== Cultural references ==
Vacuum cleaners have become closely associated with housecleaning, and artists have sometimes used them to symbolize the banality and routine of everyday life and culture. Visual artist Jeff Koons exhibited his The New series of household vacuums enshrined in museum-quality vitrines, such as New Shelton Wet/Dry Doubledecker (1981) at the Museum of Modern Art and New Hoover Convertibles, Green, Blue; New Hoover Convertibles, Green, Blue; Doubledecker (1981–1987) at the Whitney Museum of American Art. In 2002, fashion designer Tara Subkoff used topless models wielding upright vacuum cleaners to promote her controversial fashion label "Imitation of Christ".

In 2018, Paulius Markevičius organized performances of Dance for the Vacuum-Cleaner and Father choreographed by Greta Grinevičiūtė, and premiered in Vilnius, Lithuania. In 2019, Sandrina Lindgren choreographed dancers in Requiem for Vacuum Cleaning in the Barker Theatre of Turku, Finland, with each performer operating multiple machines simultaneously.

Musician Frank Zappa used vacuum cleaners in many of his different performances and on promotional artwork. Other performers have used a vacuum cleaner hose or wand as a modernized version of the Australian Aboriginal didgeridoo, or used the whine of the motor for techno music.

In 1996, Mister Rogers' Neighborhood episode #1702 featured vacuum cleaners, including dancing, magic, and a segment showing how a small Dirt Devil canister vacuum was manufactured.

== See also ==
- Home appliance
- Hypoallergenic vacuum cleaner
- Street sweeper
- Suction excavator
