= Corsi–Rosenthal Box =

Air purifier design

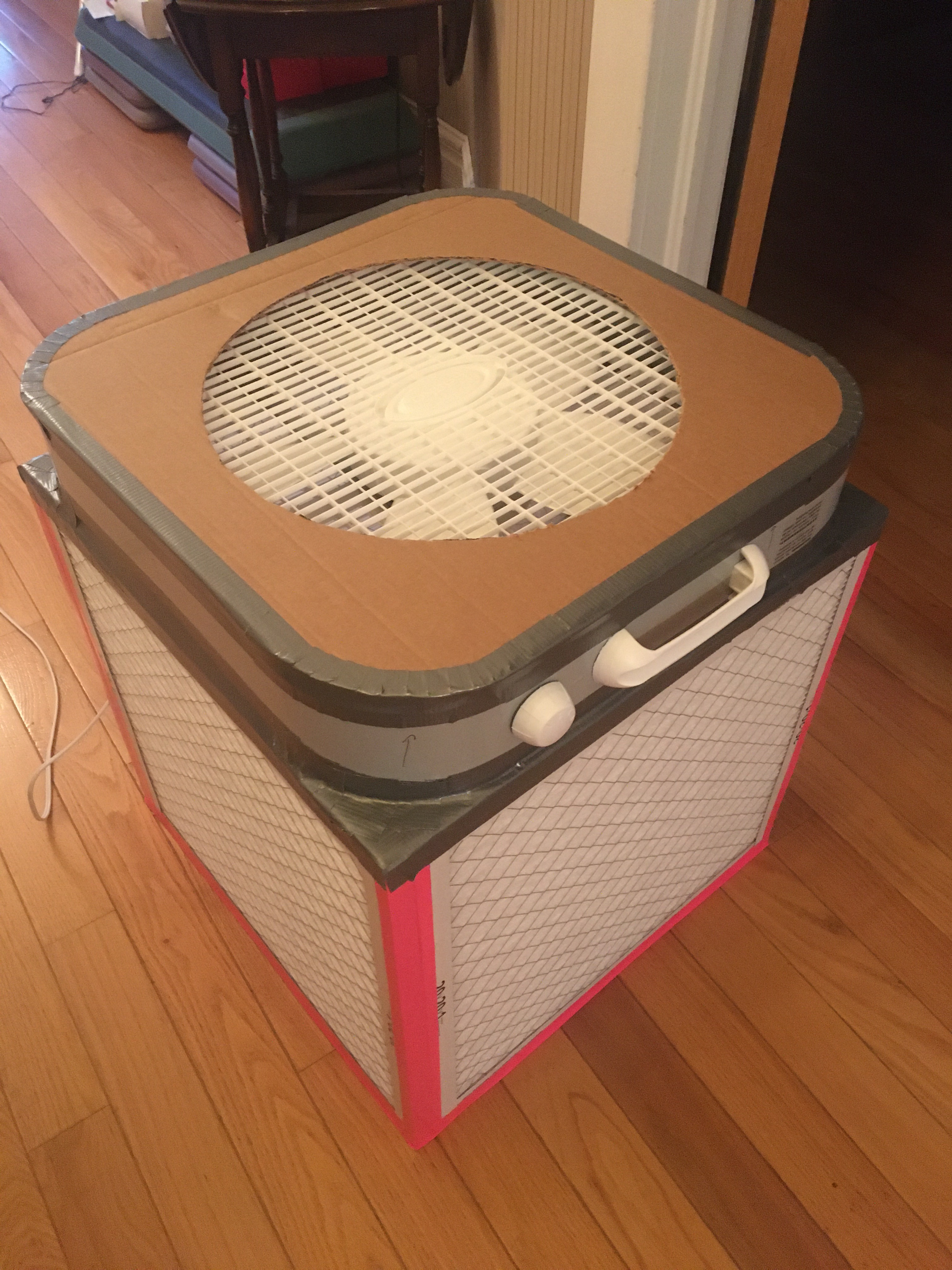
An example of a homemade unit

The Corsi–Rosenthal Box is a design for a do-it-yourself air purifier that can be built comparatively inexpensively. It consists of four or five HVAC particulate air filters that form a cube and a box fan to draw air through the filters. The seams of the cube are sealed with duct tape.

A 2022 study found the clean air delivery rate on the five-filter design was between 600 and 850 cubic feet (17–24 m^{3}) per minute (depending on fan speed), while costing roughly a tenth of commercial air filters. Engineers Richard Corsi and Jim Rosenthal created the five-filter design during the COVID-19 pandemic, with the goal of reducing the risk of infection by reducing the levels of airborne viral particles in indoor settings.

== Background and history ==
COVID-19 is primarily transmitted through the air, and superspreading events are generally associated with indoor gatherings where the virus is allowed to accumulate in the air. In response, and on recommendations of infectious disease researchers, engineers began to consider how improved ventilation may reduce risk of infection by reducing the amount of virus in indoor air.

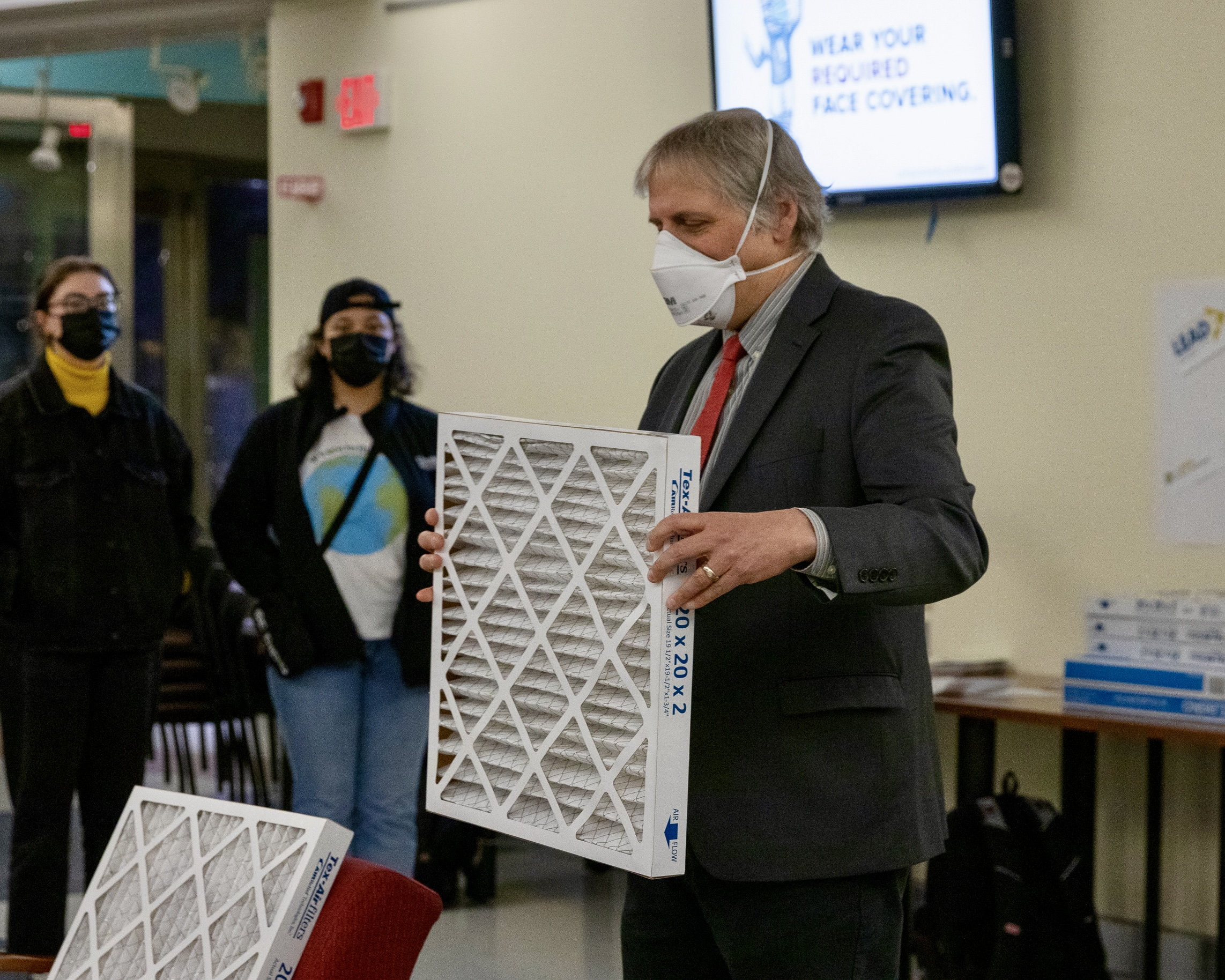
Richard Corsi in 2022

Air purification units (room or multi-room) with HEPA filtration range widely in price from under $50 to considerably more than US$500. Previous attempts to purify air with "DIY" box-like combinations of HEPA filters had been constructed in the past, but there had never been an attempt to apply such a design to reduce the airborne load of viruses.

In August 2020, Richard Corsi, an environmental engineer and the incoming Dean of Engineering at the University of California, Davis, spoke with Wired reporter Adam Rogers about an idea he had for combining multiple store-bought filters with a box fan to improve the efficiency of home-made air filter designs. Rogers contacted Jim Rosenthal, the CEO of filter manufacturer Tex-Air Filters, who had collaborated with Corsi at the University of Texas and in the Texas chapter of the Asthma and Allergy Foundation of America, to run some tests on a single air filter attached to a box fan.

Inspired by Corsi's idea to use multiple filters, Rosenthal later came up with a five-filter design. Rosenthal named it after Corsi, although after an article in The New York Times mentioned the boxes by that name, Corsi tweeted that Rosenthal really deserved the credit, and that he preferred the name Corsi–Rosenthal Box. HVAC experts Neil Comparetto and John Semmelhack modified the design in October 2020 to use four filters and a cardboard bottom, in a design called the Comparetto Cube.

== Design ==
The Corsi–Rosenthal Box design consists of four or five HVAC filters of effectiveness MERV13 or higher, which form the side walls of a box. Four-filter design variants use 20-inch wide filters, secured with duct tape and a piece of cardboard forming the bottom of the box. In Rosenthal's design from 2020, two 16×20×2-inch filters and three 20×20×2-inch filters form five sides of the cube. For both, a 20-inch (500 mm) box fan makes the last side of the cube and is duct-taped to the filters, sealing the system so that air is drawn through the filters and out of the box.

Rosenthal later improved the design by adding a shroud on the fan: this cardboard cutout covers the corners of the box fan to improve the system's efficiency by reducing backflow.

The units can be assembled in around 15 minutes, last for months, and cost between US$50 and $150 in materials.

== Efficacy ==
Airborne virus particulates range in size from 1 to 50 micrometres (μm). Rosenthal used his HVAC company's testing equipment to run an informal test of the design, in which he found that around 60% of 1 μm particles were removed by the system, and almost 90% of 10 μm particles were removed. The clean air delivery rate (CADR) of a four-filter, US$75 design were estimated at between 165 and 239 cubic feet (4.7–6.8 m^{3}) per minute (depending on fan speed) in an August 2021 case study by UC Davis researchers.

In April 2022, a team based at UC Davis published a study of a Corsi–Rosenthal Box that used five two-inch MERV-13 filters. They found that this design's "effective clean air delivery rate [CADR] increase[d] with fan speed, from about 600 to 850 ft^{3} min^{−1} (1019 to 1444 m^{3} h^{−1})". Based on the cost of their design, this output amounted to $0.08 per CADR, or roughly one-tenth the cost of commercial air purifiers, with quieter operation.

A study of a home-built air purifier to remove wildfire smoke, using a box fan and filter mounted in a window, showed that particulate matter between 1 and 10 μm in size was reduced by about 75%. Wired wrote that this study suggests such filters may effectively filter similarly sized virus particles.

Researchers have expanded studies of these citizen science filtration units to evaluate their efficacy for reducing the levels of airborne volatile chemicals (VOCs); Dodson and colleagues showed the units reduced PFAS and phthalates.

== Safety ==
A 2021 study by Underwriters Laboratories found that attaching filters to a box fan in a do-it-yourself configuration did not present a fire hazard from increased heating of the fan motor windings.

== Uses ==
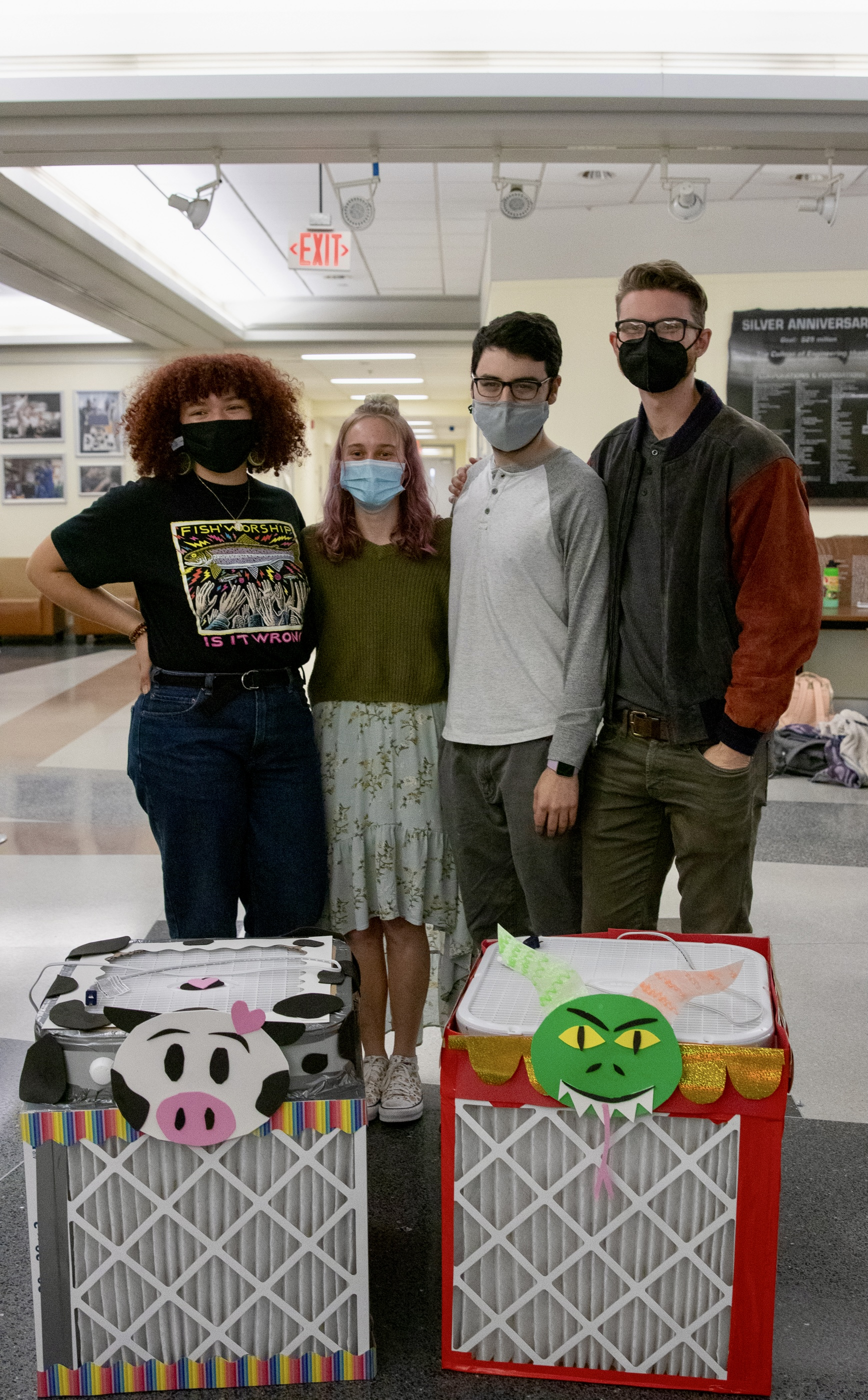
Students with decorated Corsi–Rosenthal Boxes at a competition at University of California, Davis in 2022

Corsi–Rosenthal Boxes have been used in schools to reduce risk of COVID-19 transmission, sometimes also functioning as a STEM lesson with students learning about the science of air filtration and constructing the boxes themselves. At the university level, engineering students are also running tests on the units.

Homeless shelters and daycare facilities have also used Corsi–Rosenthal Boxes to mitigate COVID risk.

Corsi–Rosenthal Boxes were also used in the 2023 wildfire season in North America, especially as smoke pollution caused hazardous air quality conditions across heavily populated areas in the Eastern United States.

== See also ==
- N95 respirator
