= Clean room (disambiguation) =

A cleanroom is an engineered space that maintains a very low concentration of airborne particulates.

Cleanroom or clean room may also re also refer to:

- "The Clean Room", a TV series episode
- Cleanroom suit, overall garment worn in a cleanroom
- Cleanroom mat, mat with an adhesive surface that is placed at the entrances or exits
- Clean-room design, the method of copying a design by reverse engineering and then recreating it without infringing any of the copyrights associated with the original design
- Cleanroom suitability, standards for operating in a cleanroom
- Cleanroom software engineering, software development process intended to produce software with a certifiable level of reliability
- Data clean room, a secure service to help exchange first-party data among organizations
