= Pressure room =

A pressure room may refer to:

- A positive pressure enclosure, which uses positive pressure to remove harmful substances from the enclosure
- A negative pressure room, which uses negative pressure to help prevent harmful substances from escaping the room
