= ISO 14644 =

ISO standard

ISO 14644 Standards were first formed from the US Federal Standard 209E Airborne Particulate Cleanliness Classes in Cleanrooms and Clean Zones. The need for a single standard for cleanroom classification and testing was long felt. After ANSI and IEST petitioned to ISO for new standards, the first document of ISO 14644 was published in 1999, ISO 14644-1.

In 2000, ISO 14644-2 was published, which began the process of FED-STD-209E being canceled. On November 29, 2001, the document was canceled and superseded by ISO 14644-1 and ISO 14644-2.

ISO 14644 is now composed of

- ISO 14644-1: Classification of air cleanliness
- ISO/DIS 14644-1.2(2014): Classification of air cleanliness by particle concentration
- ISO 14644-2: Specifications for testing and monitoring to prove continued compliance with ISO 14644-1
- ISO/DIS 14644-2.2(2014): Monitoring to provide evidence of cleanroom performance related to air cleanliness by particle concentration
- ISO 14644-3: Test Methods
- ISO 14644-4: Design, Construction, and Start-up
- ISO 14644-5: Operations
- ISO 14644-6: Vocabulary
- ISO 14644-7: Separative devices (clean air hoods, gloveboxes, isolators and minienvironments
- ISO 14644-8:2022(en), Cleanrooms and associated controlled environments — Part 8: Assessment of air cleanliness for chemical concentration (ACC)
- ISO 14644-9: Classification of surface particle cleanliness
- ISO 14644-10: Classification of Surface Cleanliness by Chemical Concentration
- ISO 14644-12: Classification of Air Cleanliness by Nanoscale Particle Concentration
- ISO 14644-13:2017 Cleaning of surfaces to achieve defined levels of cleanliness in terms of particle and chemical classifications
- ISO 14644-14: Assessment of suitability for use of equipment by airborne particle concentration
- ISO 14644-15, Cleanrooms and associated controlled environments — Part 15: Assessment of suitability for use of equipment and materials by airborne chemical concentration
- ISO 14644-17, Cleanrooms and associated controlled environments — Part 17: Particle deposition rate applications
- ISO 14644-18:2023(en) Cleanrooms and associated controlled environments — Part 18: Assessment of suitability of consumables
- ISO/TR 14644-21:2023 Cleanrooms and associated controlled environments - Part 21: Airborne particle sampling techniques

== Part 1: Classification of air cleanliness ==
ISO 14644-1 covers the classification of air cleanliness in cleanrooms and associated controlled environments. Classification in accordance with this standard is specified and accomplished exclusively in terms of concentration of airborne particulates. The document was submitted as an American National Standard and has been adopted as ANSI/IEST/ISO 14644-1:1999 in the United States, following the cancellation of FED-STD-209E.

== Part 2: Specifications for testing and monitoring to prove continued compliance with ISO 14644-1 ==
Part 2 specifies requirements for periodic testing of a cleanroom or clean zone to prove its continued compliance with ISO 14644-1 for the designated classification of airborne particulate cleanliness. It also specifies requirements for the monitoring of a cleanroom or clean zone (installation) to provide evidence of its continued compliance with ISO 14644-1 for the designated classification of airborne particulate cleanliness. It became an International Standard following the cancellation of FED-STD-209E. In the United States in 2000 it was adopted as ANSI/IEST/ISO 14644-2:2000.

== Part 3: Test Methods ==
This part specifies test methods for designated classification of airborne particulate cleanliness and for characterizing the performance of cleanrooms and clean zones. These test methods are specified in the document for two different types of cleanrooms and clean zones; unidirectional flow and nonunidirectional flow.

The most important objectives of this highly referenced document are to provide an internationally common basis of measurement and evaluation of cleanrooms and, at the same time, not to prevent the introduction of new technologies.

== Part 4: Design, construction and start-up ==
This part specifies requirements for the design and construction of cleanroom and clean air devices, as well as requirements for start-up and qualification, but does not prescribe specific technological nor contractual means to meet the requirements. This document is intended for purchasers, suppliers, and designers of cleanroom installations. It was submitted as an American National Standard in 2001.

== Part 5: Operations ==
ISO 14644-5 provides the basic requirements for operating and maintaining cleanrooms and associated controlled environments. This standard addresses requirements that are basic to the operation of all cleanrooms, regardless of the application. Topics include:

- Operational systems that must be in place
- Selection and use of appropriate cleanroom garments
- Training and monitoring of personnel and activities
- Installation and use of equipment
- Requirements for materials used in the cleanroom
- Maintaining the cleanroom environment in a clean, usable condition conforming to design standards.

This part was published as an International Standard in 2004. The document was submitted as an American National Standard and has been adopted as ANSI/IEST/ISO 14644-5:2004 in the United States.

== Part 6: Vocabulary ==
This part is an important document for any contamination control professional. This document describes all the terms and definitions in ISO 14644 and ISO 14698. In March 2008 this ISO Standard recently became an American National Standard.

== Part 7: Separative devices (clean air hoods, gloveboxes, isolators and minienvironments) ==
This part of ISO 14644 specifies the minimum requirements for the design, construction, installation, testing and approval of separative devices in those respects where they differ from cleanrooms as described in Parts 4 and 5. Separative devices range from open to closed systems.

The limitations are:

- Application-specific requirements are not addressed.
- User requirements are as agreed by customer and supplier.
- Specific processes to be accommodated in the separative device installation are not specified.
- Fire, safety and other regulatory matters are not considered specifically; the appropriate national and local requirements shall be respected.
- Full-suits are not within the scope of this standard.

This part was published as an International Standard in 2004. The document was submitted as an American National Standard and has been adopted as ANSI/IEST/ISO 14644-7:2004.

== Part 8: Classification of airborne molecular contamination ==
This part of ISO 14644 covers the classification of airborne molecular contamination (AMC) in cleanrooms and associated controlled environments, in terms of airborne concentrations of specific chemical substances (individual, group or category) and provides a protocol to include test methods, analysis and time-weighted factors within the specification for classification.

This document became a Standard in 2006. It was developed by the Secretariat of ISO Technical Committee 209, IEST.

== Part 9: Classification of surface particle cleanliness ==
This ISO document describes the classification of the particle contamination levels on solid surfaces in cleanrooms and associated controlled environments applications. Recommendations on testing and measuring methods as well as information about surface characteristics are given in informative annexes.

== See also ==
- ISO 14000 — environmental management standards exist to help organizations minimize how their operations negatively affect the environment (cause adverse changes to air, water, or land) and comply with applicable laws and regulations
- Application to cleanrooms
