= Germ-free animal =

Multi-cellular organisms that have no microorganisms living in or on them

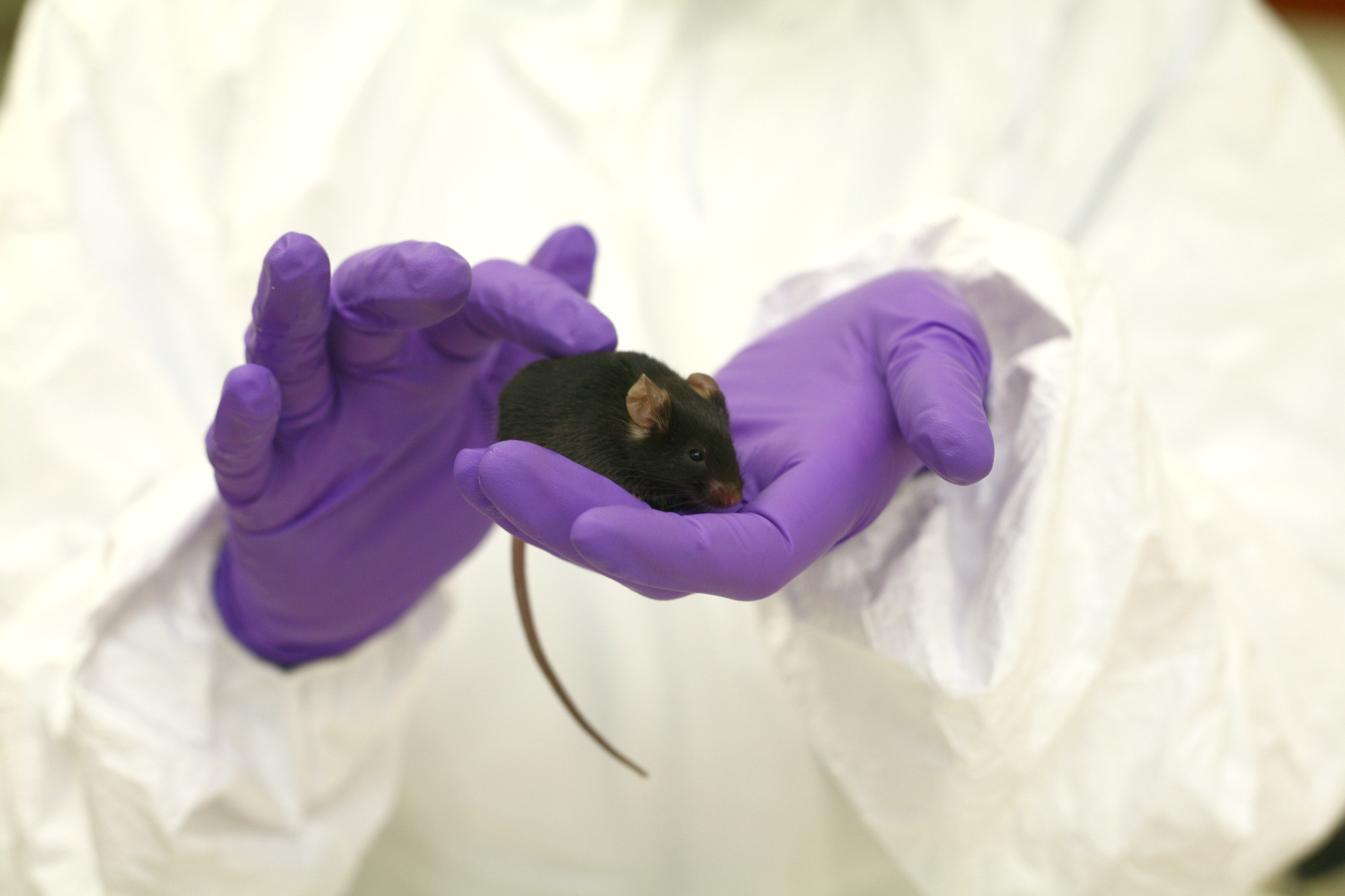
Germ-free mice are frequently used in scientific research

Germ-free organisms are multi-cellular organisms that have no microorganisms living in or on them. Such organisms are raised using various methods to control their exposure to viral, bacterial or parasitic agents. When known microbiota are introduced to a germ-free organism, it usually is referred to as a gnotobiotic organism; however, technically speaking, germ-free organisms are also gnotobiotic because the status of their microbial community is known. Due to lacking a microbiome, many germ-free organisms exhibit health deficits such as defects in the immune system and difficulties with energy acquisition. Typically germ-free organisms are used in the study of a microbiome where careful control of outside contaminants is required.

== Generation and cultivation ==
Germ-free organisms are generated by a variety of different means, but a common practice shared by many of them is some form of sterilization step followed by seclusion from the surrounding environment to prevent contamination.

=== Plants ===
Seeds are surface sterilized with chemicals, such as ethanol or an antibiotic solution, to produce a germ-free plant. The seeds are then grown in water or other mediums until germination. After germination, the seeds are transferred to either sterile soil or soil with a specific microbiota for use in experiments. Seeds may also be transferred directly to soil and allowed to germinate. If the plants are transferred to sterile soil, typically there are two types of growth methods. The first is where the entire plant is kept sterile and in the other, only the root system is kept sterile. The method is chosen based on the requirements for the experiment. The plants are grown in isolators which are frequently checked for contamination along with the soil that the plants grow in.

=== Nematodes ===
Nematodes can also be grown germ-free. Germ-free offspring of the nematode C. elegans, which is used in research, can be produced by rupturing adult worms to release eggs. The standard method for this is to introduce a population of adult worms to a bleach solution. This bleach solution ruptures the adult worms, breaking them down while simultaneously releasing and surface sterilizing any eggs. The sterilized eggs are washed and transferred to a plate of agar containing food for the worms. C. elegans consumes bacteria, so before the eggs can be transferred to the plate, the food must be killed by either heat or irradiation. This method for creating germ-free nematodes has the added benefit of age-synchronizing the worms, so that they are all of similar ages as they grow. Typically the worms will need to be transferred to a new plate as they consume all the food on the current plate, with each plate having been treated with heat or radiation as well. The plates can be protected from outside contamination by covering them and isolating them from possible contamination sources.

=== Fruit flies ===
Fruit flies, specifically the Drosophila species, have been one of the most used model organisms. Drosophila species has mostly been used in the field of genetics. There are two main methods for yielding gnotobiotic or axenic flies. One of them is to collect the eggs and dechorionate them. A chorion is the outer membrane around the embryo. In aseptic conditions, the eggs are washed twice for 2.5 minutes each, in 0.6% sodium hypochlorite solution. They are then placed with the specimens cup in 90 ml of bleach. Following this, they are washed thrice in sterile water. The dechorionated eggs are then placed in vials containing sterile diet.

The second method is by the use of antibiotics. Media, such as standard yeast-cornmeal diet, is supplemented with streptomycin or a combination of antibiotics. The concentration of the antibiotic is 400 μg/ml. Once the yeast-cornmeal diet has cooled, 4 ml of solution containing 10g of streptomycin dissolved in 100 ml of ethanol is added per litre of food. The media is then poured into vials and the freshly harvested eggs are transferred into the vials.

=== Zebrafish ===
Zebrafish (Danio rerio) are another animal model used in biomedical research that can be made germ-free. The simplest method of producing zebrafish embryos for use in generating germ-free zebrafish is natural breeding. However, during natural breeding the gametes are exposed to microbes in the intestinal contents of the adult fish as they pass through the cloaca. In order to reduce the gametes exposure to microbes, eggs and sperm can be removed from adult fish through surgery and then embryos can be created through in vitro fertilization. The embryos are then washed in solutions containing antibiotics, antifungals, povidone-iodine (PVP-I), and bleach to sterilize the surface of the chorion. The embryos can then be transferred to either a beaker set up in an isolator or a sterile cell culture flask or multiwell plate kept in an incubator. Since zebrafish live in an aquatic environment, they must be kept in zebrafish media that has been autoclaved and the sterile media is typically changed daily to prevent the build up of waste products. Once the larvae hatch they are fed sterile food. For experiments, germ-free larvae can be inoculated with microbiota sourced from zebrafish intestines or the media from conventionally raised fish.

=== Poultry ===
Germ-free poultry typically undergo multiple sterilization steps while still at the egg life-stage. This can involve either washing with bleach or an antibiotic solution to surface sterilize the egg. The eggs are then transferred to a sterile incubator where they are grown until hatching. Once hatched, they are provided with sterilized water and a gamma-irradiated feed. This prevents introduction of foreign microbes into their intestinal tracts. The incubators and animals' waste products are continuously monitored for possible contamination. Typically, when being used in experiments, a known microbiome is introduced to the animals at a few days of age. Contamination is still monitored and controlled for after this point, but the presence of microbes is expected.

=== Mice ===
Mice undergo a slightly different process due to lacking an egg life-stage. To create a germ-free mouse, an embryo is created through in vitro fertilization and then transplanted into a germ-free mother. If this method is not available, a mouse can be born through cesarean birth, but this comes with a higher risk of contamination. This process uses a non-germ-free mother which is sacrificed and sterilized before the pups' birth. After the cesarean birth, the pups must then be transferred to a sterile incubator with a germ-free mother for feeding and growth. These methods are only required for the generation of a germ-free mouse line. Once a line is generated, all progeny will be germ-free unless contaminated. These progeny can then be used for experimentation. Typically for experiments, each mouse is housed separately in a sterile isolator to prevent cross-contamination between mice. The mice are provided with sterilized food and water to prevent contamination. The sterilization methods can vary between experiments due to different diets or drugs the mice are exposed to. The isolators and waste products are continuously monitored for possible contamination to ensure complete sterility. As with poultry, a known microbiome can be introduced into the animals but contamination is still monitored for.

=== Pigs ===
The use of pigs in translational research is increasing because they can serve as a model for human health and disease due to the similarity in size and physiology, especially gastrointestinal and cardiovascular physiology. To generate germ-free pigs, the uterus, with the piglets still inside, is removed from the mother via hysterectomy and moved to an isolator so that the piglets can then be removed in a sterile environment. The piglets are reared in isolators and fed sterile milk until they are old enough to switch to sterile solid feed. The germ-free piglets are routinely checked to confirm that there are no microbes present. For use in experiments, the pigs can be colonized with microbiota from either pigs or humans.

== Health effects on organism ==
Due to lacking a healthy microbiome, many germ-free organisms exhibit major health deficits. The methods used to produce germ-free organisms can also have negative side effects on the organism. Decreased hatching rates were observed in chicken eggs incubated with mercuric chloride, while treatment with peracetic acid did not cause a significant effect on hatching rates. The chickens also exhibited defects in small intestine growth and health. Germ-free mice have been shown to have defects in their immune system and energy uptake due to lacking a healthy microbiome. There is also strong evidence for interactions between the mouse microbiome and its brain development and health. Germ-free plants exhibit severe growth defects due to lacking symbionts that provide necessary nutrients to them.

== Uses ==
=== Microbiome research ===
Germ-free animals are routinely used to establish causality in studies of the microbiome. This is done by comparing animals with a standard commensal gut microbiome to germ free, or by colonising a germ free animal with an organism of interest. The gut microbiota can vary between research facilities which can be a confounder in experiments and be a cause of lack of reproducibility. Several control microbiomes have been developed which correct the major health defects commonly present in germ free animals and can act as a reproducible control community. Germ free animals have been used to demonstrate a causal role for the gut microbiome in varied settings such as neural development, longevity, cancer immunotherapy, and numerous other health related contexts.

== See also ==
- Axenic culture
- Specific-pathogen-free
