= Positive pressure =

Force applied in a chamber to remove a fluid

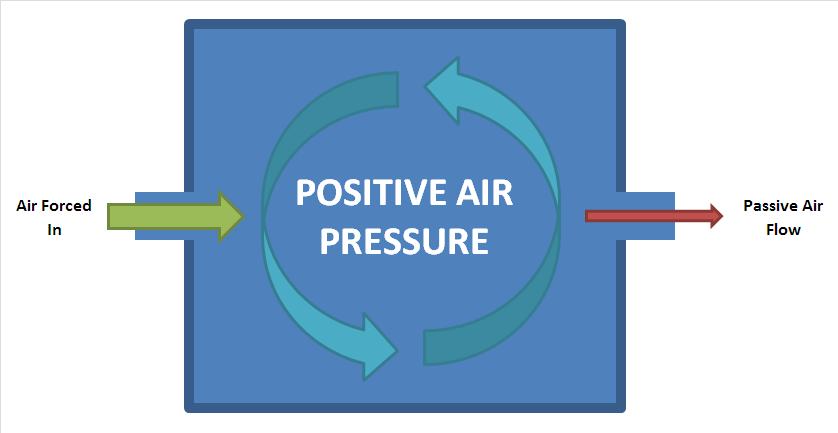
Fans or filters blow air into the system, creating a positive pressure. Excess air escapes passively through designed outlets.

Positive pressure is a pressure within a system that is greater than the environment that surrounds that system. Consequently, if there is any leak from the positively pressured system, it will egress into the surrounding environment. This is in contrast to a negative pressure room, where air is sucked in.

Use is also made of positive pressure to ensure there is no ingress of the environment into a supposed closed system. A typical example of the use of positive pressure is the location of a habitat in an area where there may exist flammable gases such as those found on an oil platform or laboratory cleanroom. This kind of positive pressure is also used in operating theaters and in vitro fertilisation (IVF) labs.

Hospitals may have positive pressure rooms for patients with compromised immune systems. Air will flow out of the room instead of in, so that any airborne microorganisms (e.g., bacteria) that may infect the patient are kept away.

This process is important in human and chick development. Positive pressure, created by the closure of anterior and posterior neuropores of the neural tube during neurulation, is a requirement of brain development.

Amphibians use this process to respire, whereby they use positive pressure to inflate their lungs.

== Historic utility ==
=== Industrial utility ===
Industrial use of positive pressure systems are commonly used to ventilate confined spaces with dust, fumes, pollutants and/or high temperatures

=== Clinical utility ===
Many hospitals are equipped with negative and positive pressure rooms just for the purposes described. Negative pressure rooms are used to help keep airborne pathogens (eg. aerosolized COVID-19 and active TB) from escaping into surrounding areas, thereby preventing the spread of airborne pathogens to outside the room. Positive pressure rooms are used for immunocompromised persons (eg. Neutropenic) whereby controlled quality air is sent into the room to prevent random (and potentially polluted) air from entering the room. The CDC recommends a positive pressure differential of at least 2.5 Pa between the positively pressured room and the adjoining hallway.

== See also ==
- Filtered air positive pressure
- Negative pressure (disambiguation)
- Negative room pressure
- Overpressure (CBRN protection)
- Plenum chamber
- Positive pressure enclosure
