= RABS =

RABS or RABs may refer to:

- Restricted-access barrier system
- Rapid Action Boat Squadron
- Redfern All Blacks, an Australian rugby league club
- "Rabs", nickname of Ray Warren
