= Bunny suit =

Bunny suit may refer to:

- A cleanroom suit
- An NBC suit
- An CBRN defense suit
- An outfit worn by a Playboy Bunny
- A costume that resembles a rabbit
- "Bunny Suit", a song by Sematary
