= Cleanroom suitability =

Operating standards

Cleanroom suitability describes the suitability of a machine, operating utility, material, etc. for use in a cleanroom, where air cleanliness and other parameters are controlled by way of technical regulations in accordance with ISO 14644.

Cleanroom suitability is a subdomain of cleanliness suitability and primarily describes the particle emission behavior of a machine or operating utility (test piece).

== Testing ==
The aim of cleanroom suitability tests is to determine the suitability of machines and operating utilities (air conditioning, venting, etc.) for use in cleanrooms. The tests must be carried out using measurement techniques as particle emission behavior cannot be adequately assessed by the naked eye or similar means. No metrological tests are required if there are obvious flaws in machines and operating utilities, such as rust or the presence of porous or completely unsuitable materials (wood, etc.).

Tests to assess the cleanroom suitability of a machine or operating utility using measurement techniques are performed in a cleanroom in order to be certain that the particles detected are emitted from the test piece. The test cleanroom has to be at least one class cleaner that the desired suitability of the test piece, otherwise it would not be possible to relate the particles detected to the test piece in question. An exception to this is when determining the suitability of a test piece for use in Class 1 cleanrooms in accordance with DIN EN ISO 14644-1: such tests have to be carried out in a Class 1 cleanroom because no other cleanroom classes are defined which are better than this. The test cleanroom must have a low-turbulence airflow (often known as laminar in this context) in order to prove high air cleanliness classes and also accurately locate particle sources.

Particle counters are utilized as measurement devices in order to determine particulate contamination with regard to geometrical size, quantity, distribution, chronological progression and location.

The cleanroom suitability of a material describes its particle emission behavior. However, as particle emission from materials can only be assessed under stress conditions, model tests on material pairings have proved to be valuable in order to obtain reproducible, comparable results. Particle emission behavior tests have to be carried out under the same conditions as for machines and operating utilities, and optical particle counters are also implemented.
