= Institute of Environmental Sciences and Technology =

The Institute of Environmental Sciences and Technology (IEST) is a non-profit, technical society where professionals who impact controlled environments connect, gain knowledge, receive advice, and work together to create industry best practices. The organization uniquely serves environmental test engineers, qualification engineers, cleanroom professionals, those who work in product testing and evaluation, and others who work across a variety of industries, including: acoustics, aerospace, automotive, biotechnology/bioscience, climatics, cleanroom operations/design/equipment/certification, dynamics, filtration, food processing, HVAC design, medical devices, nanotechnology, pharmaceutical, semiconductors/microelectronics, and shock/vibration. Information on ISO 14644 and ISO 14698 standards can be found through this organization.

Founded in 1953, the organization is headquartered in Schaumburg, Illinois. Its members are internationally recognized in the fields of environmental tests; contamination control; product reliability; and aerospace.

== International standards ==
The organization is the Secretariat of ISO/TC 209: cleanroom and associated controlled environments. This committee writes the ISO 14644 standards. IEST is also a founding member of the ANSI-accredited US TAG to ISO/TC 229 - Nanotechnologies. IEST has also revised such Federal Standards as FED-STD-209, MIL-STD-781, MIL-STD-810, and MIL-STD-1246 (now IEST-STD-1246E).

The IEST also distributes to the public all ISO 14644 and ISO 14698 standards.

== Recommended practices ==
IEST publishes and disseminates up-to-date, reliable, technical information within each of its divisions known as IEST Recommended Practices. These Recommended Practices provide procedures based on peer-approved applications. These documents are then formulated by IEST Working Groups. IEST has also revised such Federal Standards as FED-STD-209E, MIL-STD-781, MIL-STD-810, and MIL-STD-1246 (now IEST-STD-CC1246).

=== Contamination control recommended practices ===
- IEST-RP-CC001.6: HEPA and ULPA Filters
- IEST-RP-CC002.4: Unidirectional Flow Clean-Air Devices
- IEST-RP-CC003.4: Garment System Considerations in Cleanrooms and Other Controlled Environments
- IEST-RP-CC004.3: Evaluating Wiping Materials Used in Cleanrooms and Other Controlled Environments
- IEST-RP-CC005.4: Gloves and Finger Cots Used in Cleanrooms and Other Controlled Environments
- IEST-RP-CC006.3: Testing Cleanrooms
- IEST-RP-CC007.3: Testing ULPA Filters
- IEST-RP-CC008.2: High-Efficiency Gas-phase Adsorber Cells
- IEST-RP-CC011.2: A Glossary of Terms and Definitions Relating to Contamination Control
- IEST-RP-CC012.3: Considerations in Cleanroom Design
- IEST-RP-CC013.3: Calibration Procedures and Guidelines for Selecting Equipment Used in Testing Cleanrooms and Other Controlled Environments
- IEST-RP-CC014.2: Calibration and Characterization of Optical Airborne Particle Counters
- IEST-RP-CC016.2: The Rate of Deposition of Nonvolatile Residue in Cleanrooms
- IEST-RP-CC018.4: Cleanroom Housekeeping: Operating and Monitoring Procedures
- IEST-RP-CC019.1: Qualifications for Organizations Engaged in the Testing and Certification of Cleanrooms and Clean-Air Devices
- IEST-RP-CC020.2: Substrates and Forms of Documentation in Cleanrooms
- IEST-RP-CC021.4: Testing HEPA and ULPA Filter Media
- IEST-RP-CC022.2: Electrostatic Charge in Cleanrooms and Other Controlled Environments
- IEST-RP-CC023.2: Microorganisms in Cleanrooms
- IEST-RP-CC024.1: Measuring and Reporting Vibration in Microelectronics Facilities
- IEST-RP-CC026.2: Cleanroom Operations
- IEST-RP-CC027.2: Personnel Practices and Procedures in Cleanrooms and Controlled Environments
- IEST-RP-CC028.1: Minienvironments
- IEST-RP-CC029.1: Automotive Paint-Spray Applications
- IEST-RP-CC031.3: Method of Characterizing Outgassed Organic Compounds from Cleanroom Materials and Components
- IEST-RP-CC032.1: Flexible Packaging Materials for Use in Cleanrooms and Other Controlled Environments
- IEST-RP-CC034.4: HEPA and ULPA Filter Leak Testing
- IEST-G-CC035.1: Design Considerations for AMC Filtration Systems in Cleanrooms
- IEST-CC036.1: Testing Fan Filter Units
- IEST-RP-CC042.1: Sizing and Counting of Submicrometer Liquid-borne Particles Using Optical Discrete-Particle Counters
- IEST-RP-CC044.1: Vacuum Cleaning Systems for Use in Cleanrooms and Other Controlled Environments
- IEST-RP-CC046.1: Controlled Environments (Aerospace, Non-cleanroom)
- IEST-RP-CC049.1: Controlled Environments for Regulated Industries
- IEST-STD-CC1246: Product Cleanliness Levels: Applications, Requirements, and Determination

=== Nanotechnology recommended practices ===
- IEST-RP-NANO200.1: Planning of Nanoscale Science and Technology Facilities: Guidelines for Design, Construction, and Start-Up
- IEST-RP-NANO205.1: Nanotechnology Safety: Application of Prevention Through Design Principles to Nanotechnology Facilities

=== Design, test, and evaluation recommended practices ===
- IEST-RP-DTE009.1: Vibration Shaker System Selection
- IEST-RP-DTE011.2: Mechanical Shock and Vibration Transducer Selection
- IEST-RP-DTE012.2: Handbook for Dynamic Data Acquisition and Analysis
- IEST-RP-DTE019.1: Vibration Controller Selection
- IEST-RP-DTE022.1: Multi-shaker Test and Control
- IEST-RP-DTE026.1: Using MIL-STD-810F, 519 Gunfire
- IEST-RP-DTE032.2: Pyroshock Testing Techniques
- IEST-RP-DTE040.1:; High-Intensity Acoustics Testing
- IEST-RP-DTE046.1:; Terms Commonly Used in the Digital Analysis of Dynamic Data
- The History and Rationale of MIL-STD-810

=== Product reliability recommended practices ===
- IEST-RP-PR001.2: Management and Technical Guidelines for the ESS Process
- IEST-RP-PR003.1: HALT and HASS

== Journal of the IEST ==
The online Journal of the IEST publishes peer-reviewed technical papers, with a per-article fee, and free TechTalk articles related to the fields of contamination control; design, test, and evaluation; and product reliability. The online Journal provides never-before-available access to an entire decade of technical articles and peer-reviewed technical papers on simulation, testing, control, current research, and teaching of environmental sciences and technologies. The Journal of the IEST is the official publication of IEST, the Institute of Environmental Sciences and Technology, of archival quality with continuous publication since 1958.
