= Air door =

Device used to prevent air from moving from one open space to another

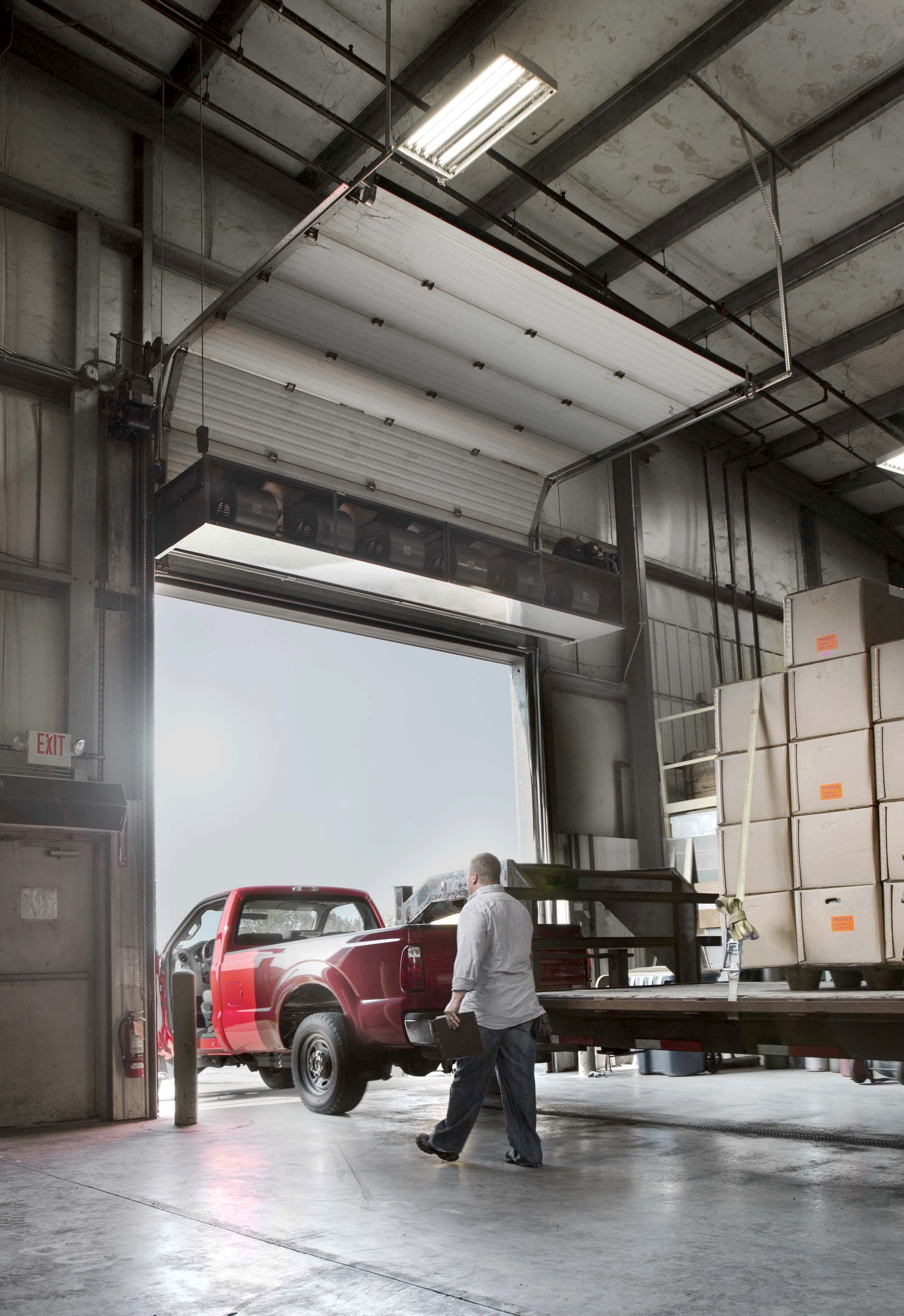
This industrial air curtain is used to separate inside and outside air without blocking the open dock door.

An air door or air curtain is a device used to prevent air, contaminants, or flying insects from moving from one open space to another. The most common implementation is a downward-facing blower fan mounted over an entrance to a building, or over an opening between two spaces conditioned at different temperatures.

== Definitions ==
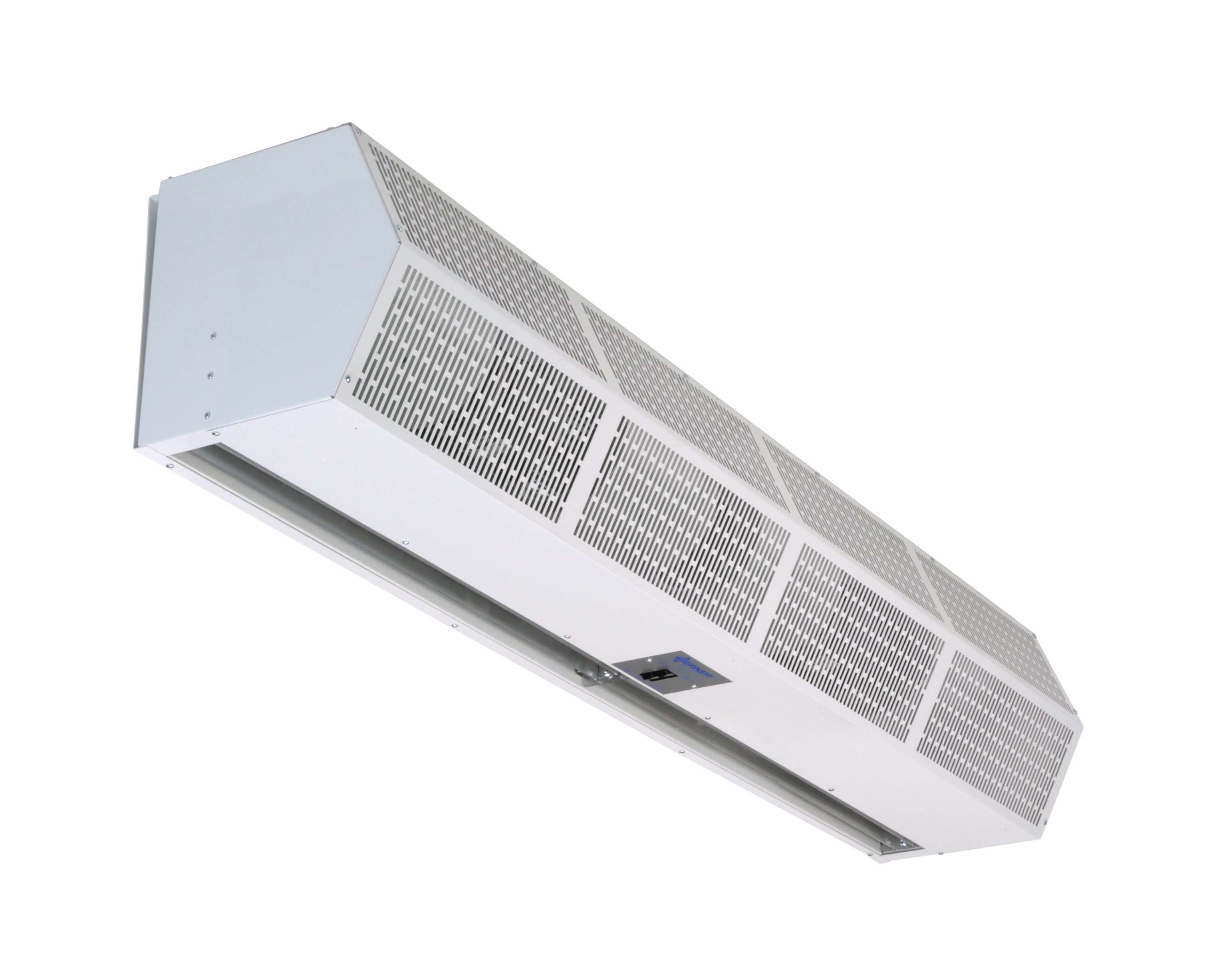
A typical commercial air curtain enclosure

In North America, the more commonly used term for an air door is "air curtain". The American Society of Heating, Refrigerating and Air-Conditioning Engineers (ASHRAE) defines an air door as follows: "In its simplest application, an air curtain is a continuous broad stream of air circulated across a doorway of a conditioned space. It reduces penetration of insects and unconditioned air into a conditioned space by forcing an air stream over the entire entrance. The air stream layer moves with a velocity and angle such that any air that tries to penetrate the curtain is entrained. Air curtain effectiveness in preventing infiltration through an entrance generally ranges from 60 to 80%".

The Air Movement and Control Association (AMCA) defines an air curtain as: "A directionally-controlled airstream, moving across the entire height and width of an opening, which reduces the infiltration or transfer of air from one side of the opening to the other and/or inhibits flying insects, dust or debris from passing through".

== Uses ==
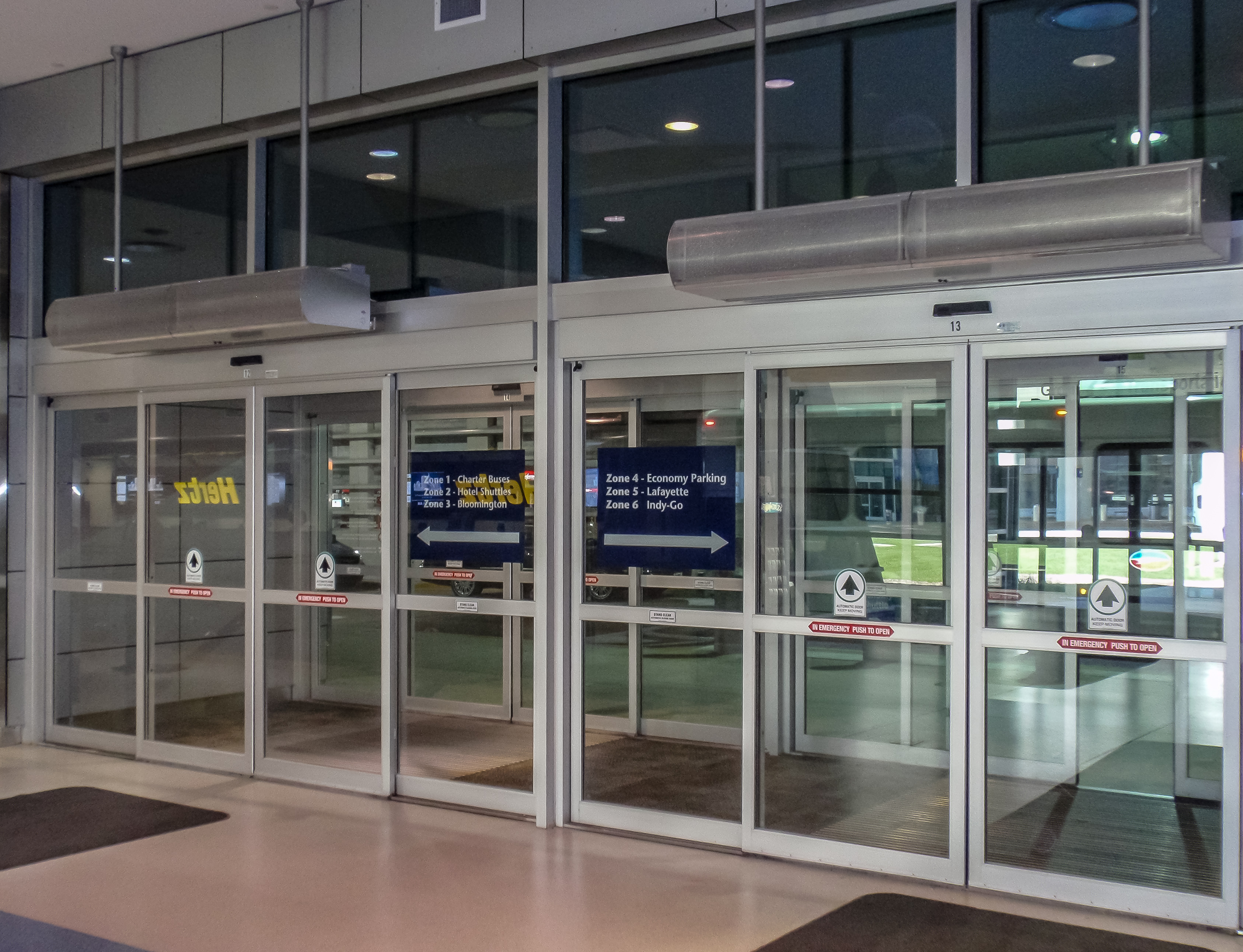
Architectural air curtains at an airport entrance

Air doors are often used where doors are required to stay open for operational purposes, such as at loading docks and vehicle entrances. They can be used to help keep flying insects out by creating forceful turbulence, or help keep out outside air, thus reducing infiltration through the opening. Cold drafts can be avoided by mixing in warm air heated by the air door. Heated air doors are commonly used when supplemental heat is needed for a space, and to reduce the wind chill factor inside the opening, in colder climates.

Further applications include customer entryways, airplane hangars, cargo doors, drive through windows, restaurant doors, or shipping receiving doors. Non-heated air curtains are often used in conjunction with cold storage and refrigerated rooms.

Air doors can be equipped with or without heaters to heat the air. The fan must be powerful enough to generate a jet of air that can reach the floor. There are some studies in the scientific literature that present analytical methods to predict the sealing efficiency obtained with an air curtain.

Air curtains have been used in hospital operating rooms to protect patients from virus-contaminated air. Following the COVID-19 pandemic, groups have been researching the use of air curtains for preventing the spread of viruses in enclosed areas such as hospital wards. These have included personalized air curtains developed at The Hong Kong Polytechnic University and desktop-type air curtain system (DACS) developed at Nagoya University. Such devices aim to use air curtains to protect healthcare workers from airborne viruses such as coronaviruses.

== Effectiveness ==
Airflow through a door depends on wind forces, temperature differences (convection), and pressure differences. Air doors work best when the pressure differential between the inside and outside of the building is as close to neutral as possible. Negative pressures, extreme temperature differences, elevators in close proximity, or extreme humidity can reduce the effectiveness of air doors.

The most effective air door for containing conditioned air inside a building with an open door will have a high face velocity at the opening, generated by top-down flow, and air recovery by a recirculating air plenum and duct return to the source fans. This configuration is feasible for new construction, but difficult to implement in existing buildings. The air door is most effective with low exterior wind velocity; at higher wind velocities, the rate of air mixing increases and the outside air portion of the total face flow increases. Under ideal conditions of zero wind, the effectiveness of the air door is at its maximum, but in windy locations air doors cannot create a perfect seal, but are still often used to reduce the amount of infiltration from an opening.

For industrial conditions, high face velocities are acceptable, despite noise and buffeting this may cause. For commercial applications like store entrances, user comfort dictates lower face velocities, which reduce effectiveness of separation of exterior air from interior air.

=== Comparison to overdoor heaters ===
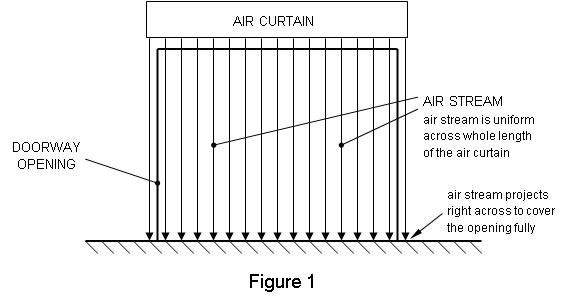
Air flow of an air door (top-down configuration)

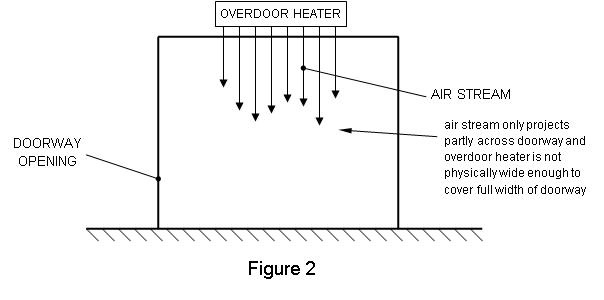
Air flow of an overdoor heater

The UK-based HEVAC Air Curtain Group describes overdoor heaters as small electric- or water-heated fanned units with a low air volume flow rate. They are intended to be installed at doorways having low pedestrian traffic where the door is mainly closed, and are useful in providing warmth. However, they should not be seen as an alternative to an air curtain, which also functions to separate the indoor and outdoor air spaces.

The main differences are:

- Air doors are designed to fully cover the width of a doorway, whereas overdoor heaters may be too narrow.
- The fans in an air door are powerful enough to provide an air stream to project across the whole doorway opening. Overdoor heaters may have less powerful fans.
- The discharge nozzle on an air door is optimized to provide a uniform air stream across the whole width of the doorway, which may not be the case with overdoor heaters.

=== Energy savings ===
Air curtains consume electrical energy during their operation, but can be used for net energy savings by reducing the heat transfer (via mass transfer when air mixes across the threshold) between two spaces. However, a closed and well-sealed physical door is much more effective in reducing energy loss. Both technologies are often utilized in tandem; when the solid door is opened the air curtain turns on, minimizing air exchange between inside and outside.

An air curtain may pay for itself in a few years by reducing the load on the building's heating or air conditioning system. Usually, there is a mechanism, such as a door switch, to turn the unit on and off as the door opens and closes, so the air curtain operates only while the door is open.

== Design ==
An authoritative engineering design procedure for calculating the supply air flow and thermal capacity of an air curtain for an HVACR application is explained in the BSRIA Application Guide 2/97 The procedure for a "Building with an Air Tightness Specification" should be followed, i.e. a practical building with some air leakage. Within the BSRIA Application Guide, Section 4.2 explains the design procedure and Section 5.2 gives worked examples for buildings with a range of air tightness specifications. This allows the engineer to calculate the supply air flow rate and thermal capacity of the required air curtain for a particular application.

== See also ==
- Airlock
- Cleanroom
- Negative room pressure – Health care isolation technique wherein some air is forced in to prevent disease spread
- Positive pressure enclosure – Chamber in which fresh air is pumped in to help remove dangerous fumes
