= Detergents Europe =

Detergens Europe
- Formation: December 1995; 30 years ago
- Headquarters: Bruxelles, Belgium
- Director: Alexis Van Maercke
- Website: https://www.detergentseurope.eu/

Detergents Europe, formerly known as the International Association for Soaps, Detergents and Maintenance Products (AISE) is a trade association representing over 900 European producers of household and professional cleaning products. It was founded in 1995 as a merger of the International Association of the Soap and Detergent Industry and the International Federation of Associations of Cleaning Products Manufacturers, the former being founded in 1952. In 2026, the organization changed its name to Detergents Europe.

== See also ==
- UK Cleaning Products Industry Association
- American Cleaning Institute
