= Air shower =

Air shower may refer to:

- Air shower (physics), the shower of particles produced when a high energy cosmic ray hits an atom high in the atmosphere
- Air shower (room), a specialized antechamber of a cleanroom
