= Cleanliness suitability =

Concept in life science industry

Cleanliness suitability describes the suitability of operating materials and ventilation and air conditioning components for use in cleanrooms where the air cleanliness and other parameters are controlled by way of technical regulations. Tests are carried out to determine this.

== Overview ==
Trends such as the miniaturization of structures as well as increased levels of reliability in technology, research and science require controlled “clean” manufacturing environments. The task of such environments is to minimize influences which could damage the products concerned. The cleanroom environments created by filtering the air were originally developed for the fields of microelectronics and microsystem technology but are now used in a wide range of other high technology sectors such as photovoltaics and the automotive industry.

Depending upon the industry and process concerned, different factors may have a damaging influence on a product, e.g.:

1. Particles, in microelectronics such as the semiconductor industry and especially biotic particles in life science industries such as pharmaceutics, bio-engineering and medical technology (cleanroom suitability)
2. Molecular contamination (outgassing), especially in microelectronics such as the semiconductor industry
3. Electrostatic discharge phenomena (ESD), especially in microelectronics such as the semiconductor industry
4. Resistance to cleaning and disinfection agents, especially in life science industries such as pharmaceutics
5. Surface interaction, especially in life science industries such as pharmaceutics, bio-engineering and medical technology
6. Cleanability, especially in life science industries such as pharmaceutics, bio-engineering and medical technology
7. Microbicidity, especially in life science industries such as pharmaceutics, bio-engineering and medical technology

== Contaminating factors ==
The following factors may be responsible for contamination:

- The cleanroom itself: Staff, although this is becoming less relevant as more and more staff are banned from working in critical areas
- The use of manufacturing equipment, which is increasing as more and more automated solutions are being implemented.
- Often in direct contact with the product, manufacturing equipment and the materials used in their construction form a further important contamination factor in a clean production environment.

== See also ==
- Cleanroom suit
