= UK Cleaning Products Industry Association =

- Abbreviation: UKCPI
- Legal status: Non-profit organization
- Purpose: Cleaning products in the UK
- Location: Century House, Old Mill Place, Tattenhall, Cheshire, CH3 9RJ
- Region served: UK
- Members: UK cleaning products companies
- Director General: Philip Malpass
- Main organ: UKCPI Council
- Affiliations: Cosmetic, Toiletry and Perfumery Association, British Association for Chemical Specialities, British Aerosol Manufacturers Association, Chemical Industries Association and International Association for Soaps, Detergents and Maintenance Products (AISE - the European Association for Soaps, Detergents, and Maintenance Products)
- Website: UKCPI

The UK Cleaning Products Industry Association is the leading trade association for companies representing UK producers of cleaning and hygiene products. This includes soaps, washing powders and liquids, household disinfectants, air care and polishes, as well as professional cleaning and hygiene products used in industrial and institutional applications.

UKCPI runs awareness campaigns relating to product safety and energy efficiency, and provides materials for schools to teach about effective hand washing.

== History ==
The inaugural meeting of the Society of British Soap Makers was held at 2.30pm on 7 July 1954, at the Queens Hotel in Leeds, and was chaired by Mr RE Huffam of Unilever Limited. Its first AGM was held at the same location, on 19 October 1955.

In 1963, the organisation became a member of European body AIS, which later merged with FIFE to become what is now AISE. In 1967 its name was changed to the Soap and Detergent Industry Association (SDIA).

In 1970 the SDIA merged with the Soap Makers Association and, that same year, appointed its first director general, Mr GV Richardson. In 2001, the merged organisation, which was still known as SDIA, changed its name to UK Cleaning Products Industry Association.

=== Chairs ===
- 1954 - 1958: RE Huffman (Unilever)
- 1958 - 1964: WH Gibbs (Unilever)
- 1964 - 1967: E Brough (Unilever)
- 1967 - 1970: AHC Hill (Lever Brothers Ltd)
- 1970 - 1971: AD Garrett (Procter & Gamble)
- 1971 - 1974: BM Harris (Cussons Group Ltd)
- 1974 - 1976: JC Tappan (P&G)
- 1976 - 1977: AD Garrett (P&G)
- 1976 - 1980: L Hardy
- 1980 - 1983: BJ Hintz (P&G)
- 1983: L Hardy
- 1983 - 1986: LG Dare (P&G)
- 1986 - 1988: RG Gray (Lever Brothers)
- 1988 - 1991: J O'Keeffe (P&G)
- 1991 - 1992: RD Brown (Lever Brothers)
- 1992 - 1993: A Seth (Lever Brothers)
- 1993 - 1995: M Clasper (P&G)
- 1995 - 1998: A Weijburg (Lever Brothers)
- 1998 - 2002: Chris de Lapuente (P&G)
- 2002 - 2004: Keith Weed (Lever Faberge)
- 2004 - 2007: Gianni Ciserani (P&G)
- 2007 - 2010: Irwin Lee (P&G)
- 2010 - 2012: Colin McIntyre (Robert McBride)
- 2012 - 2014: Brandon Pilling (ACDOCO)
- 2014 - 2017: Gemma Cleland (Unilever)
- 2017–present: Bruce Maxwell (DriPak)

=== Directors General ===
- 1970 - 1975: GV Richardson
- 1975 - 1988: AGM Burge
- 1988 - 1996: BK Chesterton
- 1996 - 2001: Jan Lewis
- 2001 - 2009: Dr Andy Williams
- 2009–present: Philip Malpass

The UK cleaning products industry is now worth an estimated £4.5 billion. £800 million of that is taken up by companies serving the industrial and institutional sector (food processing, beverage, hospitals and healthcare cleaning and disinfection, restaurants and hotels). The remainder of the total amount is taken up by household or homecare cleaning products such as laundry, bathroom and kitchen cleaning and disinfection, surface and air care products.

In September 2009, Philip Malpass replaced Dr Andy Williams as Director General.

== Function ==
UKCPI represents the UK-wide cleaning products industry, including companies which make and use products for hygiene, soap (detergents and conventional soaps), cleaning surfaces, and air fresheners. It is involved with marketing the industry as a whole (although the industry has some of the UK's notorious largest spenders on advertising) and regulation.

UKCPI represents its members’ interests directly with UK government departments and bodies on the formulation and application of government policy and regulation. As part of this remit, it is a member of the All Party Manufacturing Group.

It also works closely with the International Association for Soaps, Detergents and Maintenance Products (AISE), to represent its members' interests with the European Commission and European Parliament. UKCPI is also a member of the government's Chemicals Stakeholders Forum (CSF), the Alliance of Chemical Associations (ACA) and the Confederation of British Industry (CBI).

In terms of its members, UKCPI provides advice and guidance notes to members regarding forthcoming legislation and regulation, organises regional meetings to keep members up-to-date on technical and regulatory developments and issues. It also identifies non-competitive issues of common interest to its members and seeks their resolution through industry-wide consensus.

UKCPI maintains its own website and a members-only extranet.

== Members ==
It is based in Tattenhall in Cheshire West and Chester. Members include:

- PZ Cussons
- Procter & Gamble
- Reckitt Benckiser
- S. C. Johnson & Son
- Unilever - one of Britain's largest companies

== See also ==
- UK CPI - the UK's Consumer Price Index
- American Cleaning Institute
