= IEST-STD-CC1246 =

For United States Military Standards, IEST-STD-CC1246 is the latest revision of MIL-STD-1246. This all came about in 1997, the Army Missile Command commissioned the Institute of Environmental Sciences and Technology (IEST) to revise and adopt MIL-STD-1246 as an industry standard as its usefulness had expanded far beyond military applications, and U.S. policy was requiring agencies to convert government standards to nongovernmental standards where practical.

The updated standard was written because of a need to define quantitative cleanliness levels for products that included components and fluids. Levels were defined for both particulate and nonvolatile residue (NVR) molecular contaminants.
