= Journal of the IEST =

The Journal of the IEST is a peer-reviewed scientific journal and the official publication of the Institute of Environmental Sciences and Technology (IEST). It covers research on simulation, testing, modeling, control, and the teaching of the environmental sciences and technologies. The journal was established in 1958 as the Journal of Environmental Engineering. In October 1959, it was renamed Journal of Environmental Sciences and obtained its current title in 1998.
