= Specific-pathogen-free =

Term for laboratory animals known to be without pathogens

Specific-pathogen-free (SPF) is a term used for laboratory animals that are guaranteed free of particular pathogens. Use of SPF animals ensures that specified diseases do not interfere with an experiment. For example, absence of respiratory pathogens such as influenza is desirable when investigating a drug's effect on lung function.

== Practical ==
=== Completely germ-free ===
The animals can be born through a caesarian section then special care taken so the newborn does not acquire infections, such as use of sterile isolation units with a positive pressure differential to keep all outside air and pathogens from entering. Everything that needs to be inserted into the isolator, such as food, water and equipment needs to be completely sterilized and disinfected, and inserted through an airlock that can be disinfected before opening from the inside.

A disadvantage is that any contact with pathogens may be fatal. This is because the animals have no protective bacterial microbiota on the skin or in the intestine or respiratory tract, and because they have no natural immunity to common infections as they have never been exposed to them.

=== Specific-pathogen-free ===
To certify SPF, the population is checked for presence of (antibodies against) the specified pathogens.

For SPF eggs the specific pathogens are: Avian Adenovirus Group I, Avian Adenovirus Group II (HEV), Avian Adenovirus Group III (EDS), Avian Encephalomyelitis, Avian Influenza (Type A), Avian Nephritis Virus, Avian Paramyxovirus Type 2, Avian Reovirus S 1133, Avian Rhinotracheitis Virus; Avian Rotavirus; Avian Tuberculosis M. avium; Chicken Anemia Virus; Endogenous GS Antigen; Fowl Pox; Hemophilus paragallinarum Serovars A, B, C; Infectious Bronchitis - Ark; Infectious Bronchitis - Conn; Infectious Bronchitis - JMK; Infectious Bronchitis - Mass; Infectious Bursal Disease Type 1; Infectious Bursal Disease Type 2; Infectious Laryngotracheitis; Lymphoid Leukosis A, B; Avian Lymphoid Leukosis Virus; Lymphoid Leukosis Viruses A, B, C, D, E, J; Marek's Disease (Serotypes 1,2, 3); Mycoplasma gallisepticum; Mycoplasma synoviae; Newcastle Disease LaSota; Reticuloendotheliosis Virus; Salmonella pullorum-gallinarum; Salmonella species;

=== Minimal disease status ===
When by accident some infection does occur, the population is said to have minimal disease status.

=== Monitoring ===
The population is regularly checked to ensure the status still holds.

== Applications ==
SPF eggs can be used to make vaccines.

Mice raised under SPF conditions (no Helicobacter pylori) were shown to develop colitis rather than enterocolitis.

== See also ==
- Filtered Air Positive Pressure
- Gnotobiotic animal
