= Air shower (room) =

Cleanroom technology

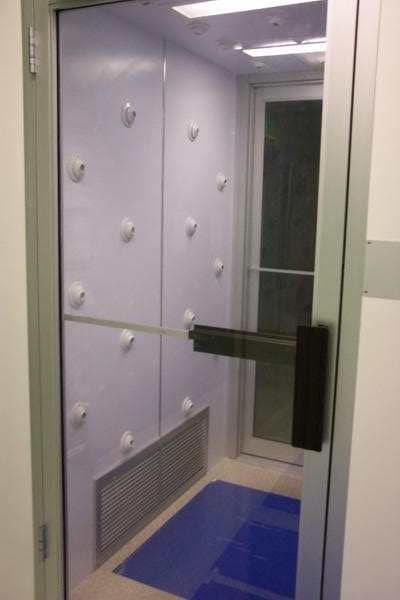
Cleanroom air shower with a blue sticky floor mat for shoe sole cleaning.

Air showers are specialized enclosed antechambers which are incorporated as entryways of cleanrooms and other controlled environments to reduce particle contamination. Air showers utilize high-pressure, HEPA- or ULPA-filtered air to remove dust, fibrous lint, and other contaminants from personnel or object surfaces. The forceful "cleansing" of surfaces before entering clean environments reduces the number of airborne particulates introduced.

When properly incorporated into cleanroom design, air showers provide an ISO-classified transition vestibule to ensure the cleanliness of the classified cleanroom. Air showers are typically placed between a gowning area and cleanroom; after workers don appropriate garb and personal protective equipment, they enter the shower so that the pressurized air nozzles remove any residual particles from coveralls. Once the program cycle is complete, users exit through a second door into the cleanroom. Air showers (or air tunnels) may also be placed between cleanrooms of different ISO ratings.

== Design and functionality ==
Air showers are generally constructed from cleanroom-compatible steel or plastic materials and feature electronically-powered blowers, filters and high-pressure jet nozzles, the latter being incorporated into the walls and ceiling of the chamber. Air, at velocities of 3,000 ft/min (15 m/s) to 7,000 ft/min (36 m/s), continuously streams from the jet nozzles for 30–45 seconds, effectively removing loose particulate matter. Personnel inside the enclosure will lift their arms and turn their bodies for uniform exposure to the air streams, a procedure usually specified in protocol. Air currents from the jets create shearing and flapping forces, which lift and remove contaminants from both flat surfaces and the creases of garments. HEPA filtration within the air shower is capable of removing 99.97% of particles greater than 0.3 μm diameter.

Air is channelled within the air shower using a closed-loop system, where it is continuously recirculated. Air is forced through a motorized filter/blower module into a large plenum, then into the shower through jet nozzles. Particle-laden, contaminated air is routed out of the shower compartment through floor vents and returned to the filtration unit. This process ensures that only decontaminated air is used to remove particulates from personnel and other equipment, such as supply carts.

Often, air showers are equipped with air ionizers to reduce static electricity, as large volumes of high-velocity air create electric charges. Since laboratory equipment, electronic measuring instruments, and many hi-tech manufactured goods can often be damaged by electrostatic discharge, ionizers are essential in rendering material surfaces electrically neutral before entering the cleanroom.

== Safety ==
Interlocking mechanisms are a common air shower feature to prevent both exits from being opened simultaneously, which would allow outside air to enter a tightly controlled environment. This requires occupants to stay inside until the decontamination cycle has been completed. For this reason, safety features such as emergency stops are required by most safety administrations. Alternatively, the air shower may consist of a long tunnel not equipped with doors. Personnel slowly walk through to reach the controlled area. Air handling equipment creates an isolated atmosphere using pressure differentials to create fluid boundaries between the inner and outer environments.
