= Fan filter unit =

Type of air filtering equipment

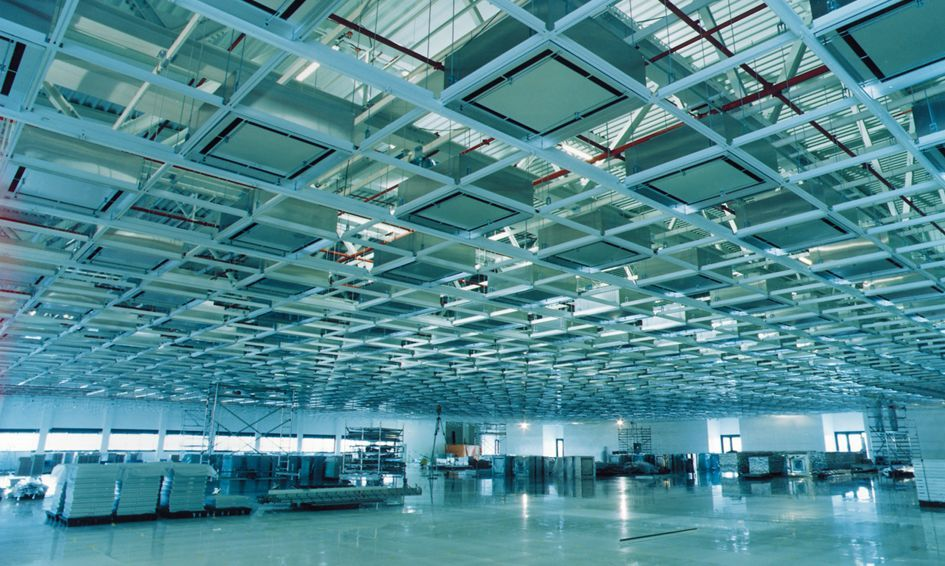
Filter ceiling grid of a cleanroom for microelectronic (semiconductor) manufacturing with filter fan units installed

A fan filter unit (FFU) is a type of motorized air filtering equipment. It is used to supply purified air to cleanrooms, laboratories, medical facilities or microenvironments by removing airborne particles from recirculating air. The units are installed within the system's ceiling or floor grid. Large cleanrooms require a proportionally large number of FFUs, which in some cases may range from several hundred to several thousand. Units often contain their own pre-filter, HEPA filter and internally controllable fan air distribution.

== Design ==
FFUs are typically manufactured in 4' x 2', 3' x 2', or 2' x 2' steel housings, which can be placed in ceiling grid bays of similar dimensions. Units often contain a pre-filter as well as a HEPA (high-efficiency particulate air), ULPA (ultra-low particulate air) or other MERV (minimum efficiency reporting value) filter. A motorized fan is used to pull air through the filters for distribution to rooms or enclosed work stations such as hoods. Fan speed is typically controlled via a step-wise or rheostat motor adjustment. Desired cleanliness levels determine the filter used: HEPA filters remove particles 0.3 μm or larger at 99.99% efficiency, while ULPA filters remove particles 0.12 μm or larger at 99.999% efficiency. FFUs are engineered for laminar air flow, as is required in critical environments. Controlled air flowing in a uniform direction and speed (carrying microparticles) is cleaner than turbulent air that flows in multiple directions or at inconsistent speeds. Eddies created by turbulent air cause contaminating microparticles to settle on clean surfaces.

== Uses ==
4' x 2' or 2' x 2' FFUs are designed to be placed in ceiling grid bays with similar dimensions. Ceiling grids with standard size bays that match FFU dimensions are used to construct cleanrooms. Depending on the cleanliness requirements of the controlled space, more fan filter units can be added to the grid in order to meet ISO standards for airflow velocity and air changes per hour.

FFUs can be used in place of a more conventional recirculating air unit such as a ducted or plenum air system. As FFUs require space above the ceiling grid (13" for the FFU module plus another 1–2 feet of "empty" air-filled space), plenums are commonly used for clean rooms with height restrictions; they are the only air systems that work in layouts with smaller internal floor dimensions. Additionally, when less than 20 filters are installed in a room, a fan- powered HEPA, FFU is generally considered to be less expensive than a more conventional ducted supply system.

When a microenvironment of clean air is required, FFUs can be used to construct enclosed work spaces, or laminar flow cabinets. Applying the same principle as the larger cleanroom grid, FFUs can be placed directly in a free- standing grid above the space that requires clean air. In fact, this approach is also used for silicon wafer etching in the semiconductor industry.
