= Pneumatic filter =

A pneumatic filter is a device which removes contaminants from a compressed air stream. This can be done using a number of different techniques and tools, such as a membrane that only allows air to pass through, or a "media" type that traps particulates but allows air to pass through to a Venturi tube.

== Usage ==
It is now common to have various stages of filtration employed in a filter-regulator-lubricator form factor, usually with the different filter housings connected. Air filtration applications are diverse and include end-user sectors such as cleanroom environments, biomedical, analytical instrumentation, food processing, marine and aviation, agriculture, manufacturing, food and beverage packaging and a host of other uses.

== Primary filters ==
Typical commercial pneumatic filters will remove particles as small as 5 micrometres from the air. The filters protect pneumatic devices from damage that would be caused by these contaminants. These contaminants include lubricant particles ejected by the compressor, dirt particles, small water droplets or aerosols.

== Secondary filters & membrane air dryers ==
Secondary filters are used for a variety of applications and can remove particles as small as 50 nanometres in size. These secondary filters can remove fumes, odors, vapor, mist, moisture, oil, and tiny particles from the air stream.

In addition, special "point-of-use" air drying devices (called membrane air dryers) may be used to depress the pressure dewpoint by selectively passing water vapor out of the compressed air stream as it passes through the inside hollows of a bundle of narrow, thinly-coated, membrane fibers. A small amount of "sweep air" must then be purged around the outside of the bundle of hollow fibers carrying the compressed air. Purge or "sweep" air is thus expanded (to atmospheric pressure) and subsequently vented to the atmosphere. The "dryer" purge air which is carried or swept along the outside of the hollow bundle of fibers creates a vapor pressure gradient between the "wet" compressed air on the inside the fibers and the "dryer" sweep air on the outside the bundle. This results in delivery of cleaner, dryer air before the compressed air is sent into any "moisture-sensitive" equipment(s).

Membrane air dryers, however, may be easily damaged through any contact with liquid droplets (water or oil) so they should be protected with a high-efficiency coalescing (nano) air filter, positioned either immediately upstream (or integrated within) the membrane air dryer housing. Membrane dryers are primarily used with equipment's that are especially sensitive to water vapor such as paint booths, two-part mixing equipment (polyurethane sealants), polyurethane dispensers, PUR-applicators (edge-banding equipment), laser-cutting machinery, CMM's, industrial ink-jet printers, or even for laboratory use.
