= Data clean room =

Secure exchange of first-party data

The data clean room (DCR) is a secure, intermediary, cloud service used among companies to mutually agree on sharing and collaborating on sensitive first-party data, which is data that is collected directly from customers and consumers. Otherwise, organizations would use anonymized and obfuscated data to help preserve sensitive first-party data, such as personal identifiable information (PII).

Organizations and groups that may use data include brands, publishers, advertisers, and groups within a company. Each group involved will create a contract that governs what each participant can and cannot do with the additional data. With organizations using other organizations' first-party data (third-party data) through DCRs, some say "third-party data has now become a first-class citizen in the information ecosystem".

Early data clean rooms started as data-sharing products within walled gardens, including Google's Ads Data Hub. And in 2018, this product was the only way to use Google ad data in Europe due to the General Data Protection Regulation (GDPR).

On July 5, 2023, IAB Tech Lab, a non-profit consortium that develops open technical standards for the ad-supported digital economy, released a set of common principles and operating recommendations on using DCRs.

== Motivations ==
The creation of DCRs was needed after the deprecation of third-party cookie data with Apple's AppTrackingTransparent (ATT) framework. In 2023, IAB Tech Lab released the Open Private Join and Activation (OPJA) specification to help with clean room interoperability among clean room providers.

The demand for data clean rooms has also increased because of the Europe's GDPR law, potential fears from data breaches such as the Facebook–Cambridge Analytica data scandal, and how some advertisers don't know the data they are purchasing.

== Examples ==
In 2019, The Hershey Company pitched the idea of a data clean room to retailers to help "get data needed to see whether its ads encourage people to buy its chocolate bars." The data clean room would allow retailers to store their loyalty card data along with ad exposure data. However, retailers resisted the idea, instead wanting the data to be in a closed platform.

In 2023, Pinterest announced that it will be using a data clean room solution from LiveRamp with Albertsons in their efforts to make Pinterest into an ecommerce platform.

Colt Technology Services has a travel platform that integrates with third party data so that employees are able to see emissions data and help them decide on choices for more sustainable travel.

In 2022, Acrisure bought the naming rights to the NFL stadium of the Pittsburgh Steelers. Hypothetically, if Acrisure wants to measure the sponsorship value of renaming the stadium, they could partner with Ticketmaster or Kraft Heinz to measure whether fans would support the name change.

== Benefits ==
Using DCRs allow organizations to collaborate with other organizations and their data in hopes to deliver "new business opportunities and enhanced customer experiences" and is possibly "changing the way organizations collaborate, analyse and derive insights from data, enabling them to unlock new opportunities for growth and success". This data collaboration is also done where participants in the exchange are unable to see each other's raw data.

== Challenges ==
Some key challenges for using data clean rooms include:

- Agreeing on the scope of data shared
- Governance and monitoring
- Finding partners to agree on a shared clean room
- Data clean rooms not completely solving privacy and data sharing issues
- Technical challenges of integrating the data exchange with the rest of an organization's software stack

== Privacy concerns ==
According to the Federal Trade Commission (FTC), DCRs do not necessarily mean these solutions are private and thus could lead to privacy washing. Privacy washing occurs when a company claims to prioritize data protections for its customers' data, but actually fails to implement best practices for securing the data. In other words, DCRs may facilitate the exchange of data between untrusted parties.

Corporations who operate clean rooms argue against these privacy concerns. Matt Karasick, VP of product at LiveRamp, claims that when DCRs are implemented properly, privacy policies are adhered to. He also emphasizes that when using DCR automated data protections, no consumer data is shared using clean rooms. Vlad Stesin, co-founder and chief strategy officer at a DCR company Optable, also comments that DCRs "need to be part of a broader approach to data collaboration" in order to both adhere to privacy needs and create business value.

More criticisms of DCRs include more accurately describing them as "secure" rather than "private" due to data clean rooms being owned by data companies that have their own identity graph data to connect to.

== Types of data clean rooms ==
Each owner of the data clean room has more influence on the governance of the data exchanged. Moreover, data clean rooms can be categorized into five categories:

1. Specialized data clean rooms (relatively small firms with a limited market)
2. Data warehouses and data lakes (e.g., Snowflake, Google, AWS, and Databricks)
3. Walled gardens and media companies (e.g., Google and Meta)
4. Data onboarding vendors (offer other services like identity resolution and data marketplaces)
5. Customer data platforms (e.g., Adobe and Blueconic)

== Companies ==
A list of some companies that operate and offer data clean room solutions include:

- Google's Ads Data Hub
- Amazon AWS' Amazon Marketing Cloud
- Roku, Inc.
- Paramount Pictures
- The Walt Disney Company
- NBCUniversal

With the rise of data clean rooms, there was a consolidation of companies offering data clean rooms. This consolidation meant eliminating friction of using multiple venders, valuing ease of use over flexible pricing, and questionable interoperability among service providers.

A list of data clean room acquisitions:

- Habu (acquired by LiveRamp in 2023)
- Samooha (acquired by Snowflake in 2023)

== See also ==
- Walled garden (technology)
- Confidential computing
- Privacy-enhancing technologies
- Differential privacy
- Information privacy
