= Restricted-access barrier system =

A restricted-access barrier system (RABS) is an installation which is used in many industries, such as pharmaceutical, medical, chemical, electrical engineering where a controlled atmosphere is needed. The RABS provides a physical barrier between workers and production areas.

== See also ==
- Clean room
