= Ultra-low particulate air =

Type of air filter

Ultra-low particulate air (ULPA) is a type of air filter. A ULPA filter can remove from the air at least 99.999% of dust, pollen, mold, bacteria and any airborne particles with a minimum particle penetration size of 120 nanometres (0.12 μm, ultrafine particles). A ULPA filter can remove—to a large extent but not 100%—oil smoke, tobacco smoke, rosin smoke, smog, and insecticide dust. It can also remove carbon black to some extent. Some fan filter units incorporate ULPA filters. The EN 1822 and ISO 29463 standards may be used to rate ULPA filters.

== Materials used in ULPA filters ==
Both high-efficiency particulate air (HEPA) and ULPA filter media have similar designs.

The filter media is like an enormous web of randomly arranged fibres. When air passes through this dense web, the solid particles get attached to the fibres and thus eliminated from the air.

Porosity is one of the key considerations of these fibres. Lower porosity, while decreasing the speed of filtration, increases the quality of filtered air. This parameter is measured in pores per linear inch.

== Method of functioning ==
Physically blocking particles with a filter, called sieving, cannot remove smaller-sized particles. The cleaning process, based on the particle size of the pollutant, is based on four techniques:

- Sieving
- Diffusion
- Inertial impaction
- Interception

A number of recommended practices have been written on testing these filters, including:

- IEST-RP-CC001: HEPA and ULPA Filters,
- IEST-RP-CC007: Testing ULPA Filters,
- IEST-RP-CC022: Testing HEPA and ULPA Filter Media, and
- IEST-RP-CC034: HEPA and ULPA Filter Leak Tests.

== Specifications ==
Efficiency	EN 1822	ISO 29463	Retention (averaged)	Retention (spot)
ULPA	U15	ISO 55 U ISO 60 U	≥ 99.9995% ≥ 99.9999%	≥ 99.9975% ≥ 99.9995%
ULPA	U16	ISO 65 U ISO 70 U	≥ 99.99995% ≥ 99.99999%	≥ 99.99975% ≥ 99.9999%
ULPA	U17	ISO 75 U	≥ 99.999995%	≥ 99.9999%

See also the different classes for air filters for comparison

== See also ==
- Minimum efficiency reporting value (MERV)
- High-efficiency particulate air (HEPA)
- Microparticle performance rating (MPR)
