= Filtered air positive pressure =

A filtered air positive pressure environment in laboratory animal science is a space that is under positive pressure with respect to the outside world. In this way, no germs that could affect the lab animals or that are a threat to the SPF status can enter the facility. To bring in new air, high efficiency particulate air filters (HEPA) are used.

In some facilities, the opposite is done: negative pressure inside prevents escape of germs to the outside world. This is done when the facility does research on dangerous germs like anthrax.

Next to these obvious things, these facilities can have other special hygiene control elements:

- air locks for personnel, feed, bedding, cages and materials (e.g. autoclave with two doors, one to the inside, one to the outside)
- showers for personnel
- emergency power generator or uninterruptible power supplies
