= American Cleaning Institute =

Organization representing producers of cleaning products

The American Cleaning Institute (ACI formerly The Soap and Detergent Association – SDA) is an organization representing producers of household, industrial, and institutional cleaning products, their ingredients and finished packaging; oleochemical producers; and chemical distributors to the cleaning product industry.

== History ==
Established in 1926, ACI's goal is to advance public understanding of the safety and benefits of cleaning products, and protect the ability of its members to formulate products that best meet consumer needs. ACI develops and shares information about industry products with the technical community, policy makers, childcare and health professionals, educators, media and consumers.

ACI includes over 100 manufacturers who make approximately 90% of all cleaning products produced in the United States, at the household, industrial, and institutional level. (The cleaning products industry is a $30 billion a year industry in the U.S.) In addition to companies that manufacture soaps and detergents directly, the association also includes producers of oleochemical products and other chemicals used in producing cleaning products, as well as companies that produce packaging and labeling for cleaning supplies.

== Activities ==
Like many trade associations, it acts as the industry's liaison with academia, the government, and the general public. In recent years, a good deal of the ACI's activities have focused on issues about which the government and the general public are concerned and the environmental impact of soaps and detergents. These concerns about human safety and environmental concerns lead the ACI to be in frequent contact with the Environmental Protection Agency, the Consumer Product Safety Commission, and the Food and Drug Administration.

In 2026, The New York Times reported that Douglas Troutman, head of government affairs at ACI, was joining the Environmental Protection Agency under the second Donald Trump administration.

== See also ==
- Cleanliness suitability
- Spotless Group Holdings
