= FED-STD-209E =

FED-STD-209 E Airborne Particulate Cleanliness Classes in Cleanrooms and Cleanzones was a federal standard concerning classification of air cleanliness, intended for use in environments like cleanrooms. The standard based its classifications on the measurement of airborne particles.

== Cancellation ==
The standard was canceled on November 29, 2001 by the United States General Services Administration (GSA). The document was superseded by standards written for the International Organization for Standardization (ISO).
