= Positive pressure enclosure =

Chamber in which fresh air is pumped in to help remove dangerous fumes

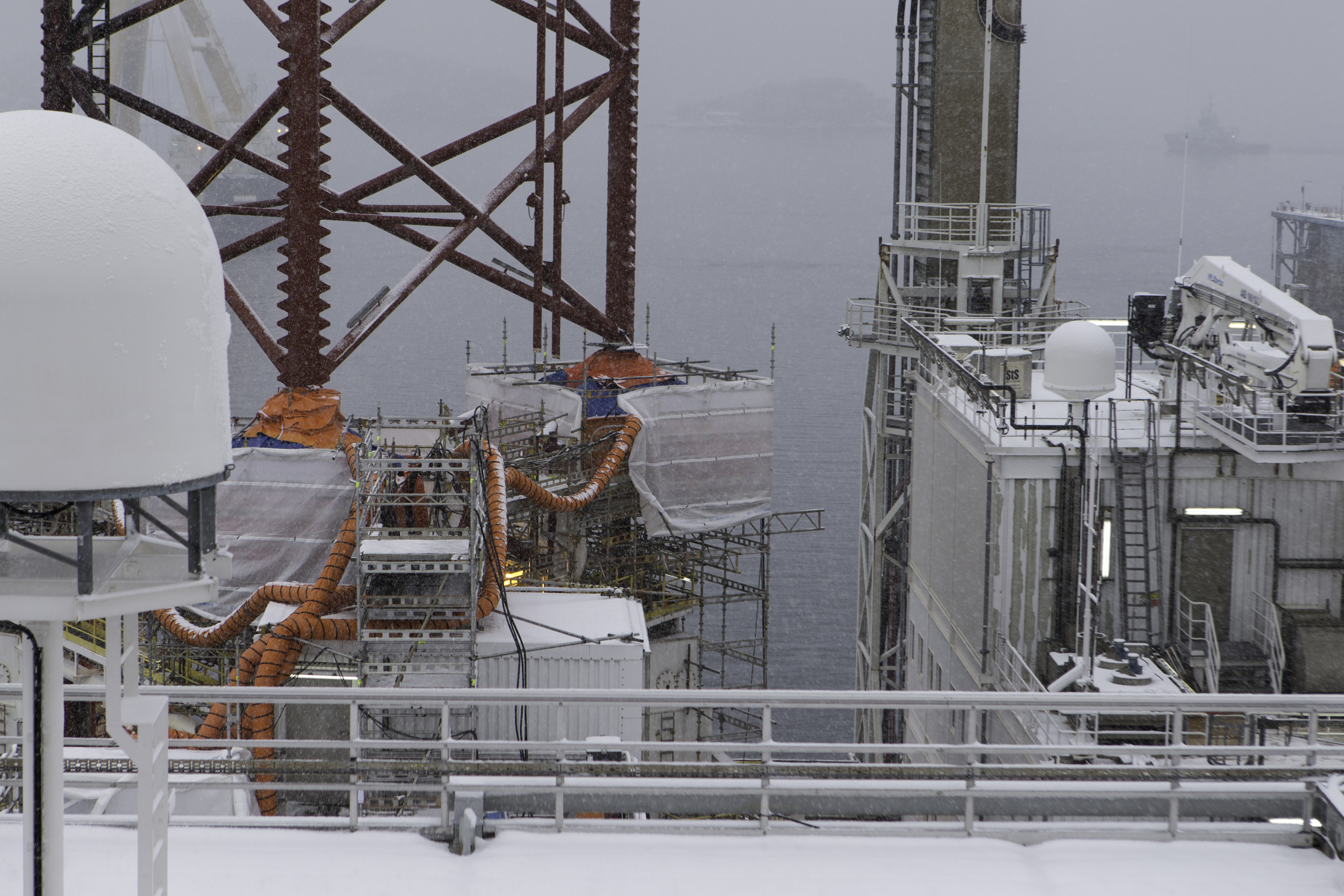
- Positive pressure enclosure in use on a North Sea drilling platform (click to expand)

A positive pressure enclosure, also known as a welding habitat or hot work habitat, is a chamber used to provide a safe working environment for performing hot work in the presence of explosive gases or vapors. They are commonly used in welding environments and are associated with the offshore oil industry.

A positive pressure enclosure works by providing a constant inflow of breathable air, which in turn causes a continuous outflow of gas from the chamber. This outflow of gas prevents the ingress of explosive gases or vapors that are often present in these work environments. This constant venting of gases from the chamber also serves to purge the air inside the chamber of unwanted gaseous byproducts of the welding process. Most commercial versions of positive pressure enclosures are referred to by their manufacturers as habitats.

== Safety measures ==
=== Air quality ===
According to Malaysia's Department of Occupational Safety and Health (DOSH) the ventilation is considered adequate when the number of air changes every hour is not less than 10 under normal conditions (defined as "processes which generate little or no heat, smoke or fume") and no less than twenty ("should there be processes which generate heat, smoke or fume").

The airflow inside the habitat should be arranged in a one-way flow with the inlet (at floor level) and outlet (at top level) on the farthest and opposite side. The habitat ventilation flow rate must be 2,000 cubic feet per minute from a clean source per welder to dilute the polluted air inside the habitat.

=== Heat stress ===
The United States Department of Labor OSHA claims that every type of job that raises workers deep core temperature (listed as higher than 100.4 degrees F (38°C)) raises the risk of heat stress, and provides a list of guidelines which might be used to manage work in these environments.

=== Positive pressure assurance ===
A minimum positive pressure of 0.1 inch of water or 0.00025 bar (equivalent to 25 Pascal or 0.00363 PSI) shall be maintained inside the Habitat enclosure to prevent ingestion of hydrocarbon in the event of leak occurred outside.

== Standards ==
=== IEC standard ===
Many countries are members of the International Electrotechnical Commission (IEC). Positive pressure enclosures, or "welding habitats" are working on the principle of overpressure. This protection principle is regulated by IEC Standard 60079-13.

=== ATEX directive ===
The ATEX certification is the national certification standard of the European Union, and mandatory to operate equipment in explosive atmosphere in Europe. ATEX certification is not based on the IECEx certification scheme, certification is bases on the ATEX directive 2014/34/EU – see main article. Under the ATEX 2014/34/EU Directive, all equipment requires a proper manufacturer's EU Declaration of Conformity. For Zone 1 welding habitats this EU Declaration of Conformity must be based on a Notified Body issued EU–Type Examination Certificate for transportable ventilated rooms EN 50381.

== Operating principles ==
=== Flammability limits ===
Flammable gases are not generally explosive under all conditions, . Additionally, oxygen must be present. The flammability limits of gases are expressed in proportions to the other gases present. For example, for methane, research by Akifumi Takahashi et al. shows limits between 4.4% for the lower explosive limit and the upper explosive limit at 16.3%. A positive pressure enclosure works by ensuring that the methane present in the work area never approaches the lower explosive limit.

=== Positive pressure ===
The operating pressure inside a typical isolation chamber is set only marginally above local pressure; typically only 0.05 kilopascals (about 0.007 pounds per square inch) above local atmospheric pressure. This is low enough to be undetectable to operators working inside the enclosure (a person sitting in a bathtub full of water is exposed to higher pressures), but due to the leakages, it needs to ensure that the volume of air inside the enclosure is constantly changing. Intake air is drawn into the enclosure by fan units.

== See also ==
- Air door – Device used to prevent air from moving from one open space to another
- Negative room pressure – Health care isolation technique wherein some air is forced in to prevent disease spread
