= Cleanroom suit =

Full-body garments worn to control contamination in cleanrooms

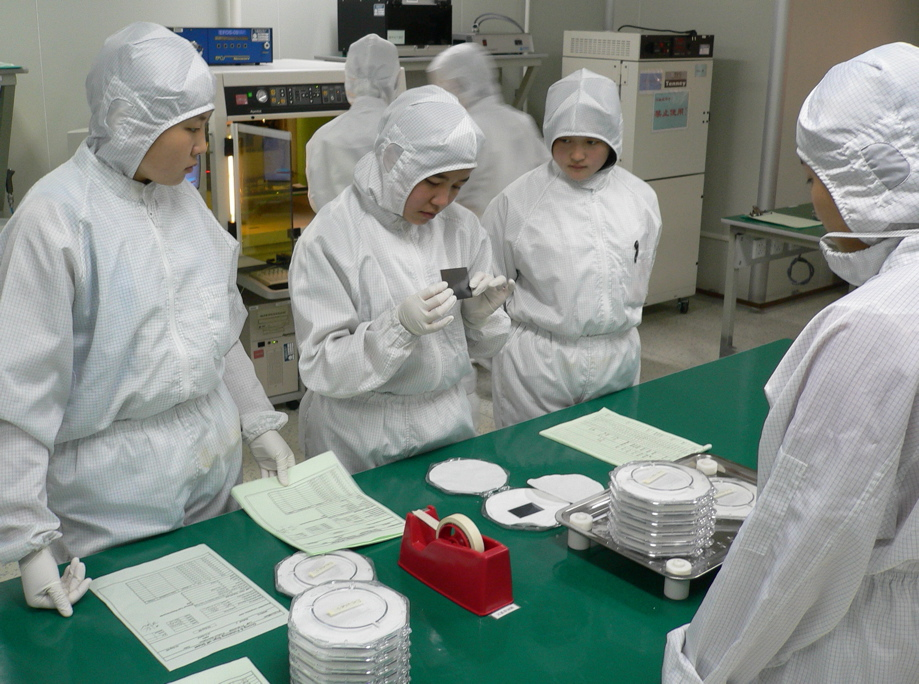
Technicians wearing clean room suits inspect a semiconductor wafer

A cleanroom suit, clean room suit, or bunny suit is an overall garment worn in a cleanroom, an environment with a controlled level of contamination. One common type is an all-in-one coverall worn by semiconductor and nanotechnology line production workers, technicians, and process / equipment engineers. Similar garments are worn by people in similar roles creating sterile products for the medical device, biopharmaceutical and optical instrument industries.

The suit covers the wearer to prevent skin and hair being shed into a clean room environment. The suit may be in one piece or consist of several separate garments worn tightly together. The suit incorporates both boots and hood, designed to be breathable and lightweight while protecting the wearer. Polypropylene with a polyethylene coating, or Tyvek polyethylene are standard. The materials found in cleanroom suits can also be found on personal protective equipment.

More advanced designs with face covers were introduced in the 1990s (like the Intel fab worker-style suits seen on the Pentium product advertisements).

Suits are usually deposited in a storage bin after being contaminated for dry cleaning, autoclaving and/or repair. Some clothing items, such as nitrile gloves and shoe covers, may be disposed of after every use.

The term "bunny suit" is also used for hazmat suits, worn by workers handling high-risk hazardous biological or chemical substances, as well as in the containment areas of nuclear power plants. These suits consist of the main garment, hood, thin cotton gloves, rubber gloves, plastic bags over normal work shoes, and rubber booties. The wrists and ankles are taped down with masking tape. Occasionally a plastic raincoat is also worn. Removal of the garments (into several barrels) is a complicated process which must be performed in an exact sequence. Often a health physicist is present in the work area to observe good anti-contamination practices.

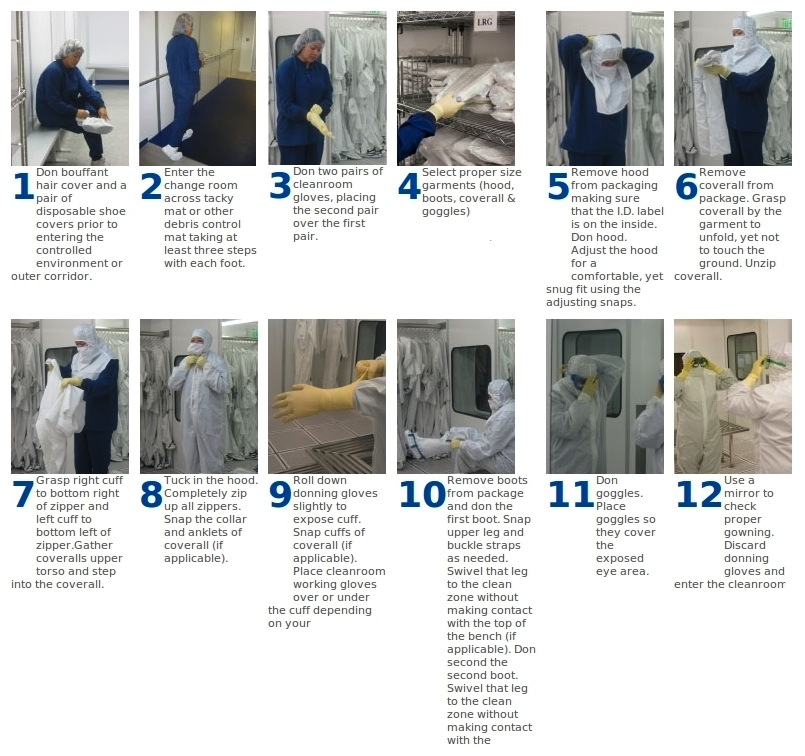
Pictorial demonstration of gowning

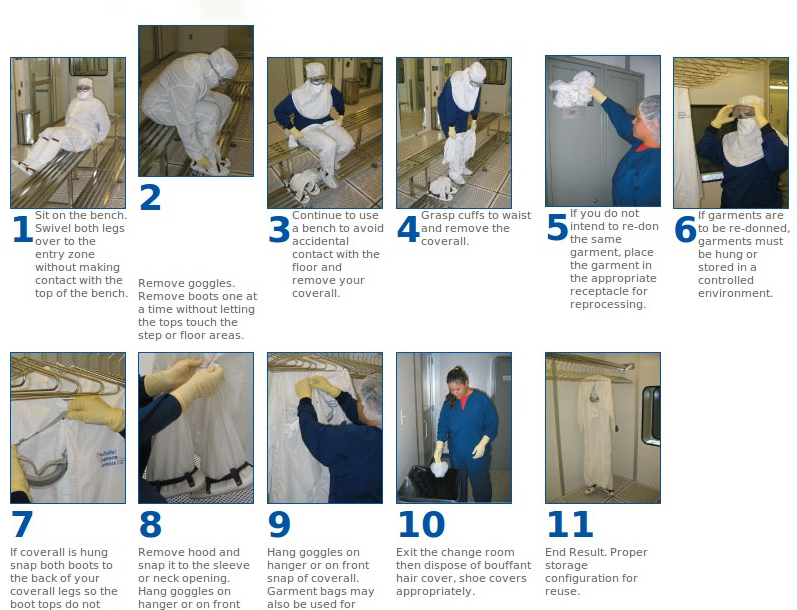
Pictorial demonstration of de-gowning
