= Cleanroom =

Dust-free room for research or production

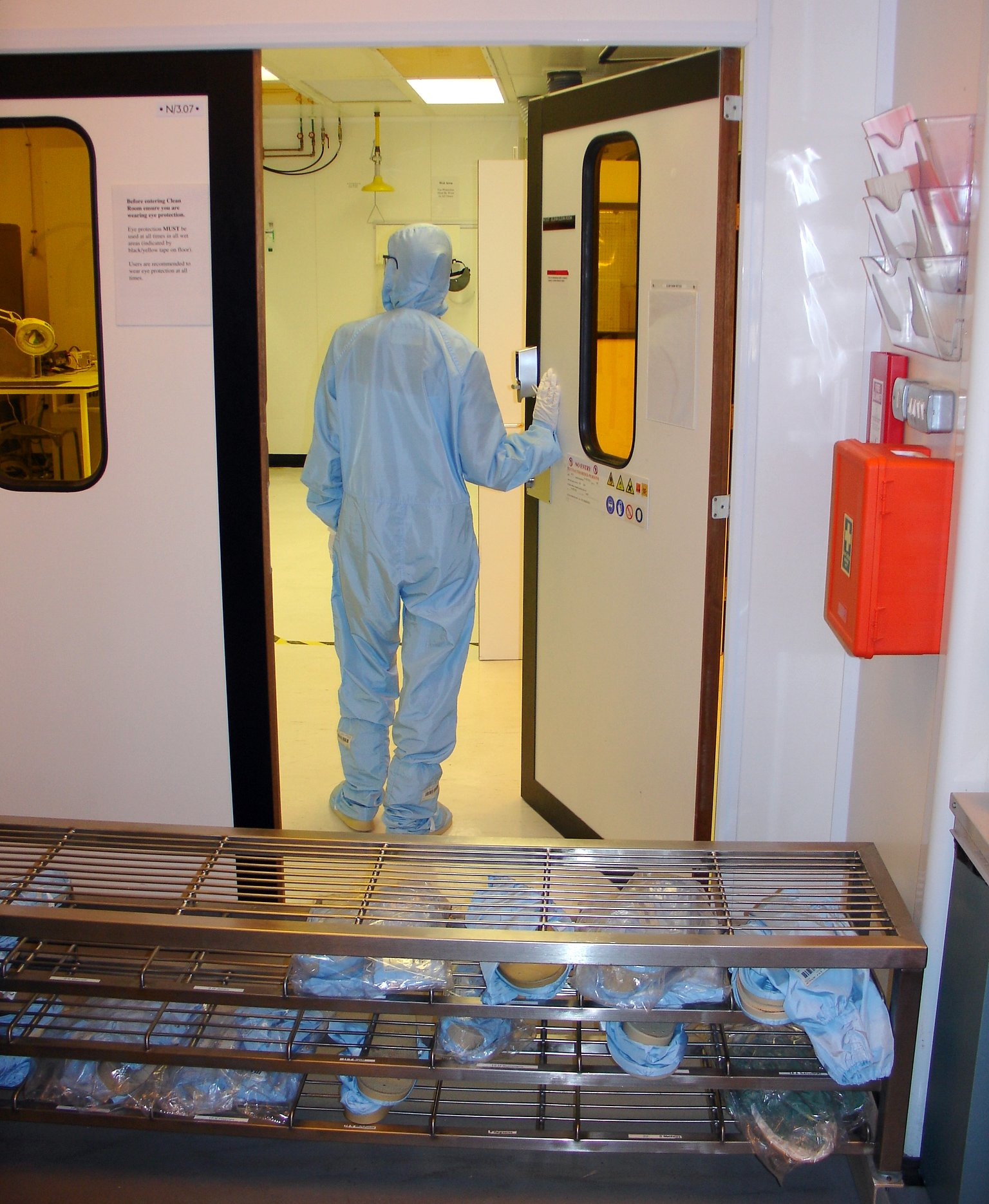
Entrance to a cleanroom with no air shower

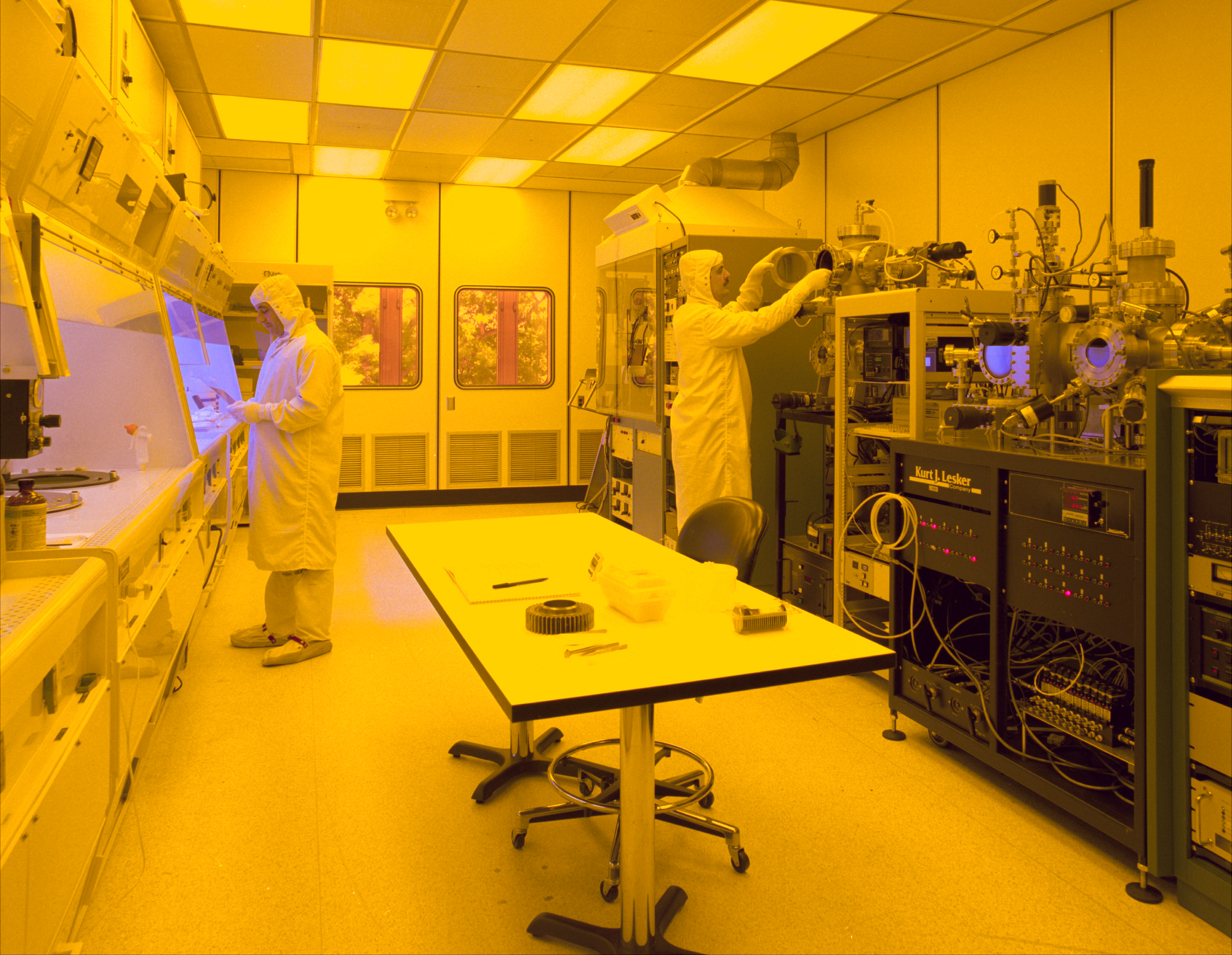
Cleanroom used for the production of microsystems. The yellow (red-green) lighting is necessary for photolithography, to prevent unwanted exposure of photoresist to light of shorter wavelengths.

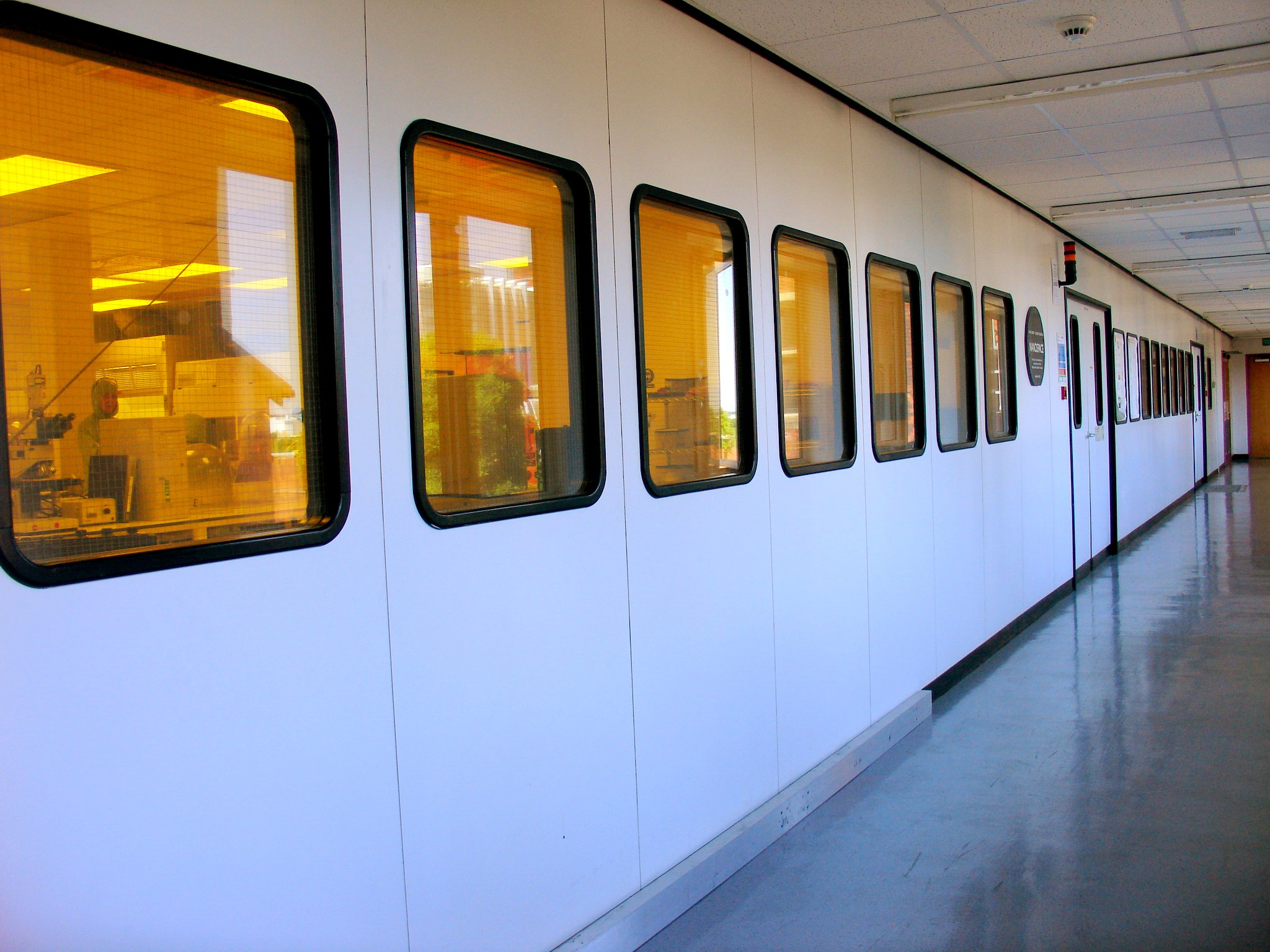
Cleanroom from outside

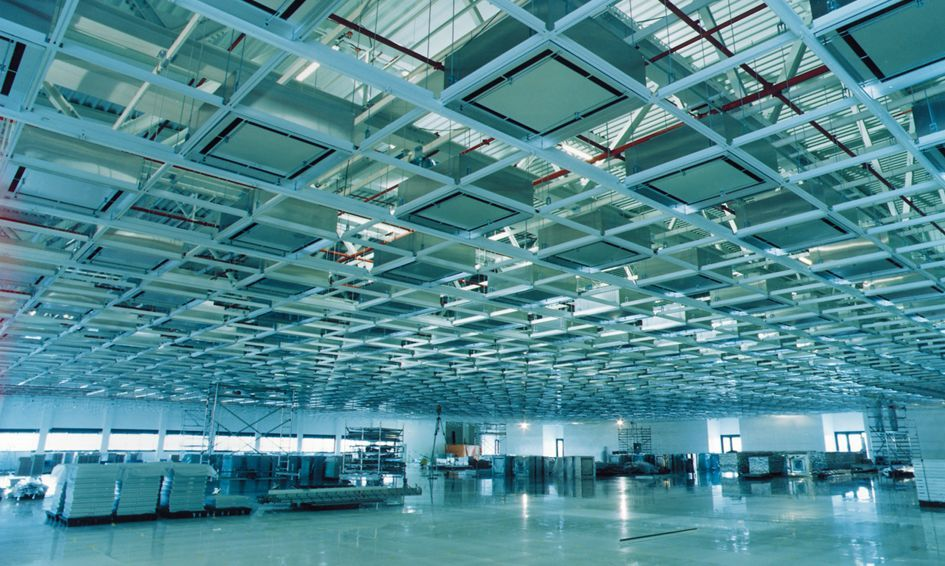
Cleanroom for microelectronics manufacturing with fan filter units installed in the ceiling grid

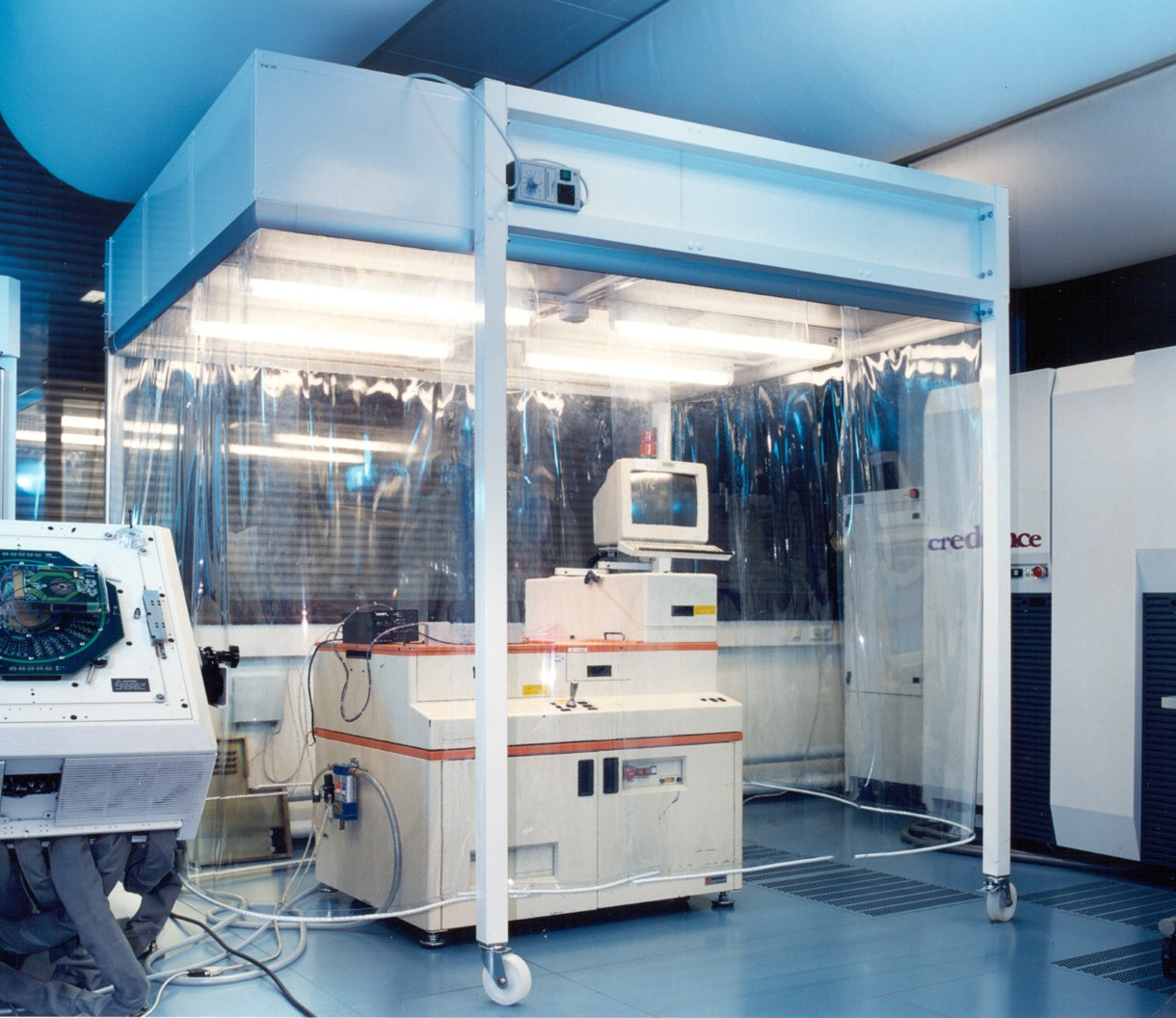
Cleanroom cabin for precision measuring tools

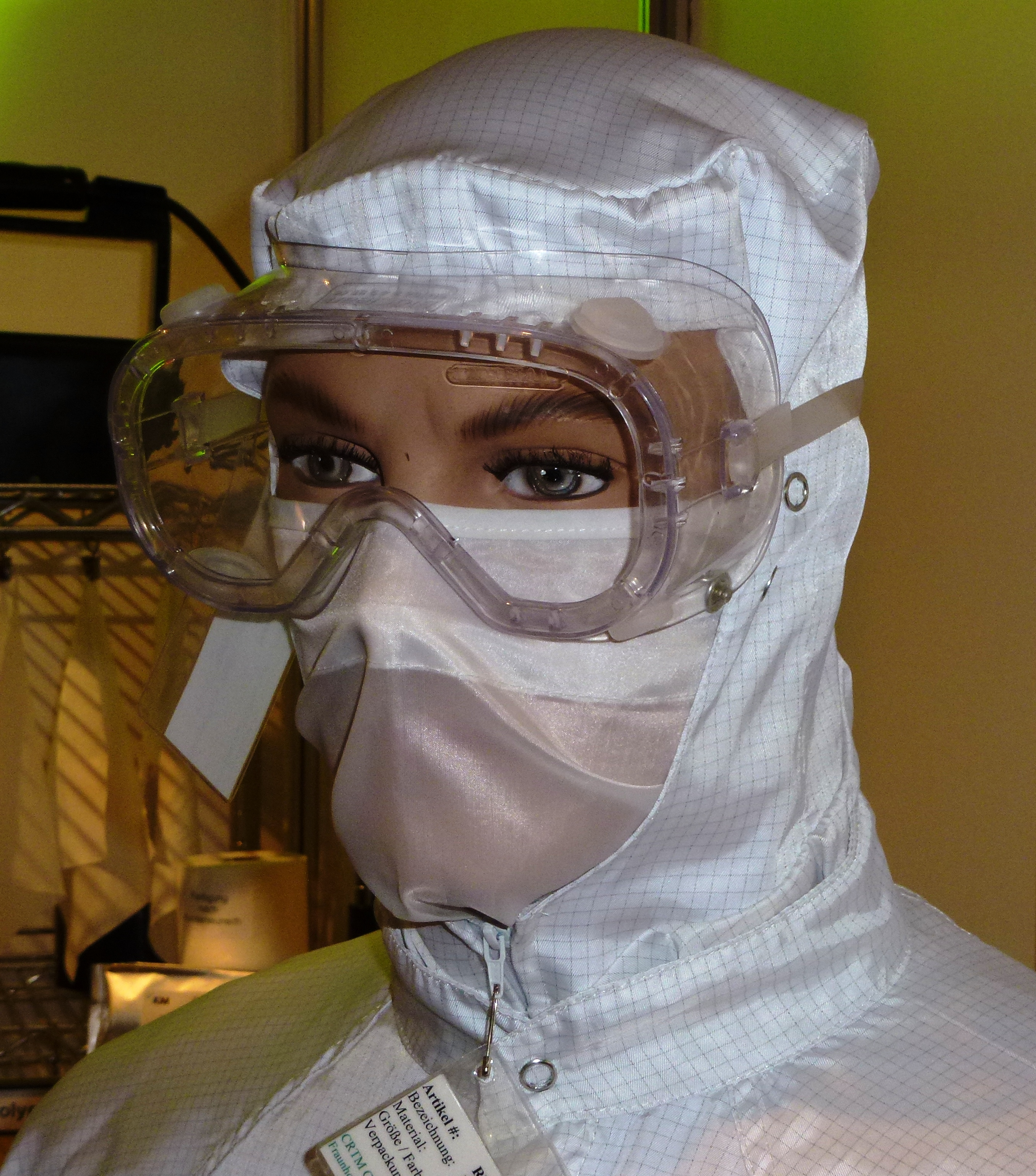
Typical cleanroom head garment

A cleanroom or clean room is an engineered space that maintains a very low concentration of airborne particulates. It is well-isolated, well-controlled from contamination, and actively cleansed. Such rooms are commonly needed for scientific research and in industrial production for all nanoscale processes, such as semiconductor device manufacturing. A cleanroom is designed to keep everything from dust to airborne organisms or vaporised particles away from it, and so from whatever material is being handled inside it.

A cleanroom can also prevent the escape of materials. This is often the primary aim in hazardous biology, nuclear work, pharmaceutics, and virology.

Cleanrooms typically come with a cleanliness level quantified by the number of particles per cubic meter at a predetermined molecule measure. The ambient outdoor air in a typical urban area contains 35,000,000 particles for each cubic meter in the size range 0.5 μm and bigger, equivalent to an ISO 9 certified cleanroom. By comparison, an ISO 14644-1 level 1 certified cleanroom permits no particles in that size range, and just 12 particles for each cubic meter of 0.3 μm and smaller. Semiconductor facilities often get by with level 7 or 5, while level 1 facilities are exceedingly rare.

== History ==
The modern cleanroom was invented by American physicist Willis Whitfield. As an employee of the Sandia National Laboratories, Whitfield created the initial plans for the cleanroom in 1960. Prior to Whitfield's invention, earlier cleanrooms often had problems with particles and unpredictable airflows. Whitfield designed his cleanroom with a constant, highly filtered airflow to flush out impurities. Within a few years of its invention in the 1960s, Whitfield's modern cleanroom had generated more than US$50 billion in sales worldwide (approximately $511 billion today).

By mid-1963, more than 200 U.S. industrial plants had such specially constructed facilities—then using the terminology "white rooms", "clean rooms", or "dust-free rooms"—including the Radio Corporation of America, McDonnell Aircraft, Hughes Aircraft, Sperry Rand, Sylvania Electric, Western Electric, Boeing, and North American Aviation. RCA began such a conversion of part of its Cambridge, Ohio facilities in February 1961. Totalling 70,000 square feet, it was used to prepare control equipment for the Minuteman ICBM missiles.

The majority of the integrated circuit manufacturing facilities in Silicon Valley were made by three companies: MicroAire, PureAire, and Key Plastics. These competitors made laminar flow units, glove boxes, cleanrooms and air showers, along with the chemical tanks and benches used in the "wet process" building of integrated circuits. These three companies were the pioneers of the use of Teflon for airguns, chemical pumps, scrubbers, water guns, and other devices needed for the production of integrated circuits. William (Bill) C. McElroy Jr. worked as an engineering manager, drafting room supervisor, QA/QC, and designer for all three companies, and his designs added 45 original patents to the technology of the time. McElroy also wrote a four-page article for MicroContamination Journal, wet processing training manuals, and equipment manuals for wet processing and cleanrooms.

== Overview ==
A cleanroom is a necessity in the manufacturing of semiconductors, rechargeable batteries, pharmaceutical products, and any other field that is highly sensitive to environmental contamination.

Cleanrooms can range from the very small to the very large. On the one hand, a single-user laboratory can be built to cleanroom standards within several square meters, and on the other, entire manufacturing facilities can be contained within a cleanroom with factory floors covering thousands of square meters. Between the large and the small, there are also modular cleanrooms. They have been argued to lower costs of scaling the technology, and to be less susceptible to catastrophic failure.

With such a wide area of application, not every cleanroom is the same. For example, the rooms utilized in semiconductor manufacturing need not be sterile (i.e., free of uncontrolled microbes), while the ones used in biotechnology usually must be. Vice versa, operating rooms need not be absolutely pure of nanoscale inorganic salts, such as rust, while nanotechnology absolutely requires it. What is common to all cleanrooms is strict control of airborne particulates, possibly with secondary decontamination of air, surfaces, workers entering the room, implements, chemicals, and machinery.

Sometimes particulates exiting the compartment are also of concern, such as in research into dangerous viruses, or where radioactive materials are being handled.

== Basic construction ==
First, outside air entering a cleanroom is filtered and cooled by several outdoor air handlers using progressively finer filters to exclude dust.

Within, air is constantly recirculated through fans serving high-efficiency particulate absorbing filters (HEPA), and/or ultra-low particulate air (ULPA) filters to remove internally generated contaminants. Special lighting fixtures, walls, equipment and other materials are used to minimize the generation of airborne particles.

Air temperature and humidity levels inside a cleanroom may be tightly controlled, because they affect the process and personnel as well as the generation and retention of particles. If a particular room experiences humidity low enough to make static electricity a concern, it too may be controlled by, e.g., introducing controlled amounts of charged ions into the air using a corona discharge. Static discharge is of particular concern in the electronics industry, where it can instantly destroy components and circuitry.

Equipment inside any cleanroom is designed to generate minimal air contamination. The selection of material for the construction of a cleanroom should not generate any particulates; hence, monolithic epoxy or polyurethane floor coating or welded sheet goods are preferred. Finished stainless steel or powder-coated mild steel sandwich partition panels and ceiling panel are used instead of iron alloys prone to rusting and then flaking. Corners like the wall to wall, wall to floor, wall to ceiling are avoided by providing coved surface, and all joints need to be sealed with epoxy sealant to avoid any deposition or generation of particles at the joints, by vibration and friction. Many cleanrooms have a "tunnel" design in which there are spaces called "service chases" that serve as air plenums carrying the air from the bottom of the room to the top so that it can be recirculated and filtered at the top of the cleanroom.

=== Airflow principles ===
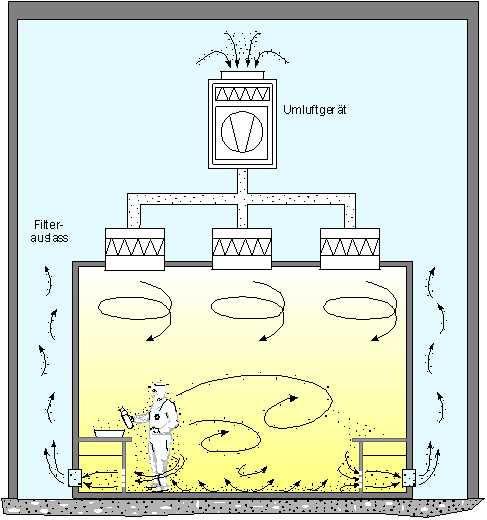
Airflow pattern for "Turbulent Cleanroom"

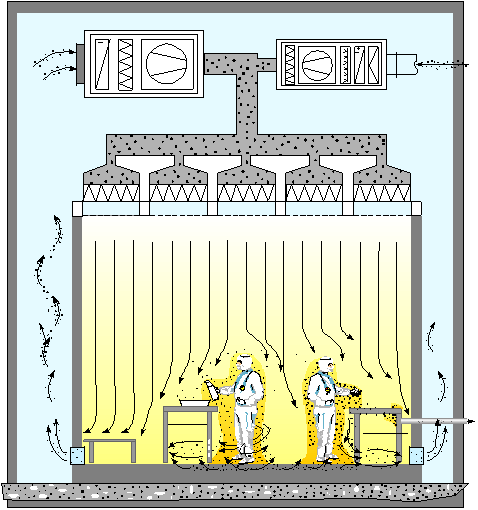
Airflow pattern for "Laminar Flow Cleanroom"

Cleanrooms maintain particulate-free air through the use of either HEPA or ULPA filters employing laminar or turbulent airflow principles. Laminar, or unidirectional, airflow systems direct filtered air downward or in horizontal direction in a constant stream towards filters located on walls near the cleanroom floor or through raised perforated floor panels to be recirculated. Laminar airflow systems are typically employed across 80% of a cleanroom ceiling to maintain constant air processing. Stainless steel or other non shedding materials are used to construct laminar airflow filters and hoods to prevent excess particles entering the air. Turbulent, or non-unidirectional, airflow uses both laminar airflow hoods and nonspecific velocity filters to keep air in a cleanroom in constant motion, although not all in the same direction. The rough air seeks to trap particles that may be in the air and drive them towards the floor, where they enter filters and leave the cleanroom environment. US FDA and EU have laid down stringent guidelines and limits to ensure freedom from microbial contamination in pharmaceutical products. Plenums between air handlers and fan filter units, along with sticky mats, may also be used.

In addition to air filters, cleanrooms can also use ultraviolet light to disinfect the air. UV devices can be fitted into ceiling light fixtures and irradiate air, killing potentially infectious particulates, including 99.99 percent of airborne microbial and fungal contaminants. UV light has previously been used to clean surface contaminants in sterile environments such as hospital operating rooms. Their use in other cleanrooms may increase as equipment becomes more affordable. Potential advantages of UV-based decontamination includes a reduced reliance on chemical disinfectants and the extension of HVAC filter life.

=== Cleanrooms of different kinds ===
Some cleanrooms are kept at a positive pressure so if any leaks occur, air leaks out of the chamber instead of unfiltered air coming in. This is most typically the case in semiconductor manufacturing, where even minute amounts of particulates leaking in could contaminate the whole process, while anything leaking out would not be harmful to the surrounding community. The opposite is done, e.g., in the case of high-level bio-laboratories that handle dangerous bacteria or viruses; those are always held at negative pressure, with the exhaust being passed through high-efficiency filters, and further sterilizing procedures. Both are still cleanrooms because the particulate level inside is maintained within very low limits.

Some cleanroom HVAC systems control the humidity to such low levels that extra equipment like air ionizers are required to prevent electrostatic discharge problems. This is a particular concern within the semiconductor business, because static discharge can easily damage modern circuit designs. On the other hand, active ions in the air can harm exposed components as well. Because of this, most workers in high electronics and semiconductor facilities have to wear conductive boots while working. Low-level cleanrooms may only require special shoes, with completely smooth soles that do not track in dust or dirt. However, for safety reasons, shoe soles must not create slipping hazards. Access to a cleanroom is usually restricted to those wearing a cleanroom suit, including the necessary machinery.

In cleanrooms in which the standards of air contamination are less rigorous, the entrance to the cleanroom may not have an air shower. An anteroom (known as a "gray room") is used to put on cleanroom clothing. This practice is common in many nuclear power plants, which operate as low-grade inverse pressure cleanrooms, as a whole.

Recirculating vs. one pass cleanrooms

Recirculating cleanrooms return air to the negative pressure plenum via low wall air returns. The air then is pulled by HEPA fan filter units back into the cleanroom. The air is constantly recirculating and by continuously passing through HEPA filtration removing particles from the air each time. Another advantage of this design is that air conditioning can be incorporated.

One pass cleanrooms draw air from outside and pass it through HEPA fan filter units into the cleanroom. The air then leaves through exhaust grills. The advantage of this approach is the lower cost. The disadvantages are comparatively shorter HEPA fan filter life, worse particle counts than a recirculating cleanroom, and that it cannot accommodate air conditioning.

== Aseptic Practices/Processing ==
Aseptic practices are critical in environments where contamination control is paramount, particularly in the pharmaceutical, biotechnology, and medical device industries. Aseptic processing involves maintaining a sterile environment to prevent the introduction of contaminants during the manufacturing of products, such as sterile injectable medications and sterile medical equipment. This requires stringent control over personnel behavior, equipment sterilization, and the cleanroom environment.

There are different classifications for aseptic or sterile processing cleanrooms. The Pharmaceutical Inspection Co-operation Scheme (PIC/S) classifies cleanrooms into four grades (A, B, C, and D) based on their cleanliness level, particularly the concentration of airborne particles and viable microorganisms.

== Operating procedure ==
In order to minimize the carrying of particulate by a person moving into the cleanroom, staff enter and leave through airlocks (sometimes including an air shower stage) and wear protective clothing such as hoods, face masks, gloves, boots, and coveralls.

Common materials such as paper, pencils, and fabrics made from natural fibers are often excluded because they shed particulates in use.

Particle levels are usually tested using a particle counter and microorganisms are detected and counted through environmental monitoring methods such as active air sampling, passive air sampling, and surface sampling, or using rapid microbial methods like PCR. Polymer tools used in cleanrooms must be carefully determined to be chemically compatible with cleanroom processing fluids as well as ensured to generate a low level of particle generation.

When cleaning, only special mops and buckets are used. Cleaning chemicals used tend to involve sticky elements to trap dust, and may need a second step with light molecular weight solvents to clear. Cleanroom furniture is designed to produce a minimum of particles and is easy to clean.

A cleanroom is defined not only by its physical space but also by the controlled processes and disciplined practices required to maintain it.

=== Personnel contamination of cleanrooms ===
The greatest threat to cleanroom contamination comes from the users themselves. In the healthcare and pharmaceutical sectors, control of microorganisms is important, especially microorganisms likely to be deposited into the air stream from skin shedding. Studying cleanroom microflora is of importance for microbiologists and quality control personnel to assess changes in trends. Shifts in the types of microflora may indicate deviations from the "norm" such as resistant strains or problems with cleaning practices.

In assessing cleanroom microorganisms, the typical flora are primarily those associated with human skin (Gram-positive cocci), although microorganisms from other sources such as the environment (Gram-positive rods) and water (Gram-negative rods) are also detected, although in lower number. Common bacterial genera include Micrococcus, Staphylococcus, Corynebacterium, and Bacillus, and fungal genera include Aspergillus and Penicillium.

== Cleanroom classification and standardization ==
Cleanrooms are classified according to the number and size of particles permitted per volume of air. Large numbers like "class 100" or "class 1000" refer to FED-STD-209E, and denote the number of particles of size 0.5 μm or larger permitted per cubic foot of air. The standard also allows interpolation; for example SNOLAB is maintained as a class 2000 cleanroom. Federal Standard 209E was superseded by ANSI/IEST

A discrete, light-scattering airborne particle counter is used to determine the concentration of airborne particles, equal to and larger than the specified sizes, at designated sampling locations.

Small numbers refer to ISO 14644-1 standards, which specify the decimal logarithm of the number of particles 0.1 μm or larger permitted per m^{3} of air. So, for example, an ISO class 5 cleanroom has at most 10^{5} particles/m^{3}.

Both FS 209E and ISO 14644-1 assume log-log relationships between particle size and particle concentration. For that reason, zero particle concentration does not exist. Some classes do not require testing some particle sizes, because the concentration is too low or too high to be practical to test for, but such blanks should not be read as zero.

Because 1 m^{3} is about 35 ft^{3}, the two standards are mostly equivalent when measuring 0.5 μm particles, although the testing standards differ. Ordinary room air is around class 1,000,000 or ISO 9.

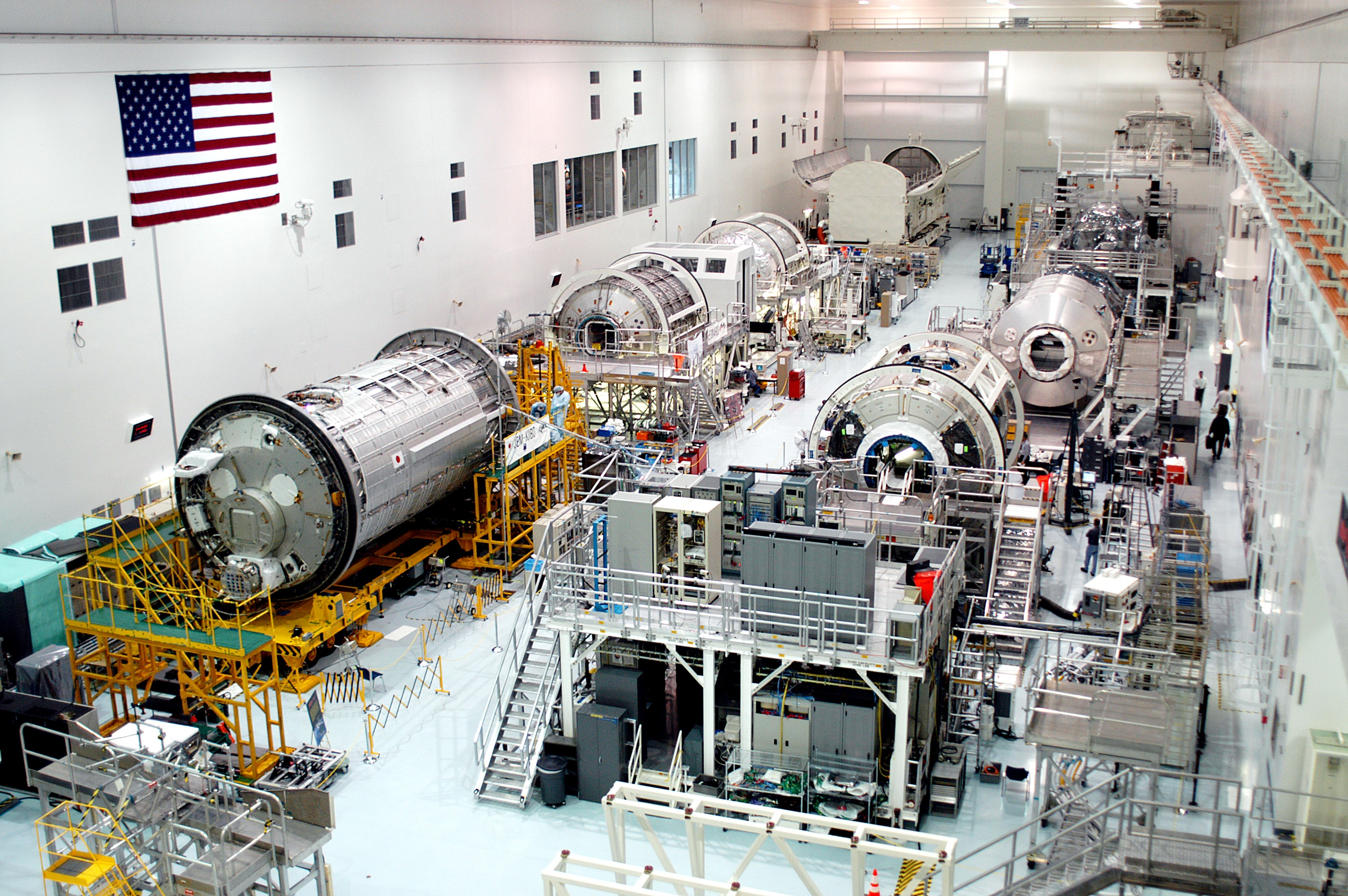
The cleanroom processing bay of the KSC Space Station Processing Facility. NASA maintains a standard of 100,000 class in the SSPF.

=== ISO 14644-1 and ISO 14698 ===
ISO 14644-1 and ISO 14698 are non-governmental standards developed by the International Organization for Standardization (ISO). The former applies to cleanrooms in general (see table below), the latter to cleanrooms where biocontamination may be an issue. Since the strictest standards have been achieved only for space applications, it is sometimes difficult to know whether they were achieved in vacuum or standard conditions.

ISO 14644-1 defines the maximum concentration of particles per class and per particle size with the following formula

$\text{C}_\text{N} = 10^{\text{N}} \left(\frac{0.1}{\text{D}}\right)^{2.08}$

Where $\text{C}_\text{N}$ is the maximum concentration of particles in a volume of 1m$^3$ of airborne particles that are equal to, or larger, than the considered particle size which is rounded to the nearest whole number, using no more than three significant figures, $\text{N}$ is the ISO class number, $\text{D}$ is the size of the particle in $\mu$m and 0.1 is a constant expressed in $\mu$m. The result for standard particle sizes is expressed in the following table.

Class	Maximum particles/m^{3 a}						FED STD 209E equivalent
Class	≥0.1 μm	≥0.2 μm	≥0.3 μm	≥0.5 μm	≥1 μm	≥5 μm	FED STD 209E equivalent
ISO 1	10^{b}	^{d}	^{d}	^{d}	^{d}	^{e}	
ISO 2	100	24^{b}	10^{b}	^{d}	^{d}	^{e}	
ISO 3	1,000	237	102	35^{b}	^{d}	^{e}	Class 1
ISO 4	10,000	2,370	1,020	352	83^{b}	^{e}	Class 10
ISO 5	100,000	23,700	10,200	3,520	832	^{d,e,f}	Class 100
ISO 6	1,000,000	237,000	102,000	35,200	8,320	293	Class 1,000
ISO 7	^{c}	^{c}	^{c}	352,000	83,200	2,930	Class 10,000
ISO 8	^{c}	^{c}	^{c}	3,520,000	832,000	29,300	Class 100,000
ISO 9	^{c}	^{c}	^{c}	35,200,000	8,320,000	293,000	Room air
^{a} All concentrations in the table are cumulative, e.g. for ISO Class 5, the 10 200 particles shown at 0,3 μm include all particles equal to and greater than this size.^{b} These concentrations will lead to large air sample volumes for classification. Sequential sampling procedure may be applied; see Annex D.^{c} Concentration limits are not applicable in this region of the table due to very high particle concentration.^{d} Sampling and statistical limitations for particles in low concentrations make classification inappropriate.^{e} Sample collection limitations for both particles in low concentrations and sizes greater than 1 μm make classification at this particle size inappropriate due to potential particle losses in the sampling system.^{f} In order to specify this particle size in association with ISO Class 5, the macroparticle descriptor M may be adapted and used in conjunction with at least one other particle size. (See C.7.)

=== US FED STD 209E ===
US FED-STD-209E was a United States federal standard. It was officially cancelled by the General Services Administration on November 29, 2001, but is still widely used.

Class	Maximum particles/ft^{3}					ISO equivalent
Class	≥0.1 μm	≥0.2 μm	≥0.3 μm	≥0.5 μm	≥5 μm	ISO equivalent
1	35	7.5	3	1	0.007	ISO 3
10	350	75	30	10	0.07	ISO 4
100	3,500	750	300	100	0.7	ISO 5
1,000	35,000	7,500	3000	1,000	7	ISO 6
10,000	350,000	75,000	30,000	10,000	70	ISO 7
100,000	3.5×10^{6}	750,000	300,000	100,000	830	ISO 8

Current regulating bodies include ISO, USP 800, US FED STD 209E (previous standard, still used).

- Drug Quality and Security Act (DQSA) created in Nov. 2013 in response to drug compounding deaths and serious adverse events.
- The Federal Food, Drug, and Cosmetic Act (FD&C Act) created specific guidelines and policies for human compounding.
  - 503A addresses compounding by state or federally licensed facility by licensed personnel (pharmacist/ physicians)
  - 503B pertaining to outsourcing facilities need direct supervision from a licensed pharmacist and do not need to be a licensed pharmacy. Facility is licensed through the Food and Drug Administration (FDA)

=== EU GMP classification ===
EU GMP guidelines are more stringent than others, requiring cleanrooms to meet particle counts at operation (during manufacturing process) and at rest (when manufacturing process is not carried out, but room AHU is on).

Class	Maximum particles/m^{3}			
Class	At Rest		In Operation	
Class	0.5 μm	5.0 μm	0.5 μm	5.0 μm
Grade A	3,520	Optional	3,520	Optional
Grade B	3,520	Optional	352,000	2,900
Grade C	352,000	2,900	3,520,000	29,000
Grade D	3,520,000	29,000	User Defined	User Defined

=== BS 5295 ===
BS 5295 is a British Standard.

Class	Maximum particles/m^{3}				
Class	≥0.5 μm	≥1 μm	≥5 μm	≥10 μm	≥25 μm
Class 1	3,000		0	0	0
Class 2	300,000		2,000	30	
Class 3		1,000,000	20,000	4,000	300
Class 4			200,000	40,000	4,000

BS 5295 Class 1 also requires that the greatest particle present in any sample can not exceed 5 μm. BS 5295 has been superseded, withdrawn since the year 2007 and replaced with "BS EN ISO 14644-6:2007".

=== USP <800> standards ===
USP 800 is a United States standard developed by the United States Pharmacopeial Convention (USP) with an effective date of December 1, 2019.

== Ramifications and further applications ==
In hospitals, theatres are similar to cleanrooms for surgical patients' operations with incisions to prevent any infections for the patient.

In another case, severely immunocompromised patients sometimes have to be held in prolonged isolation from their surroundings, for fear of infection. At the extreme, this necessitates a cleanroom environment. The same is the case for patients carrying airborne infectious diseases, only they are handled at negative, not positive pressure.

Since larger cleanrooms are very sensitive controlled environments upon which multibillion-dollar industries depend, sometimes they are even fitted with numerous seismic base isolation systems to prevent costly equipment malfunction.

== See also ==
- Air quality index
- Contamination control
- Data recovery lab
- Indoor air quality
- Microfiltration
- Pressure room (disambiguation)
- Pneumatic filter
- Secure environment
