= N95 respirator =

Particulate respirator meeting the N95 standard

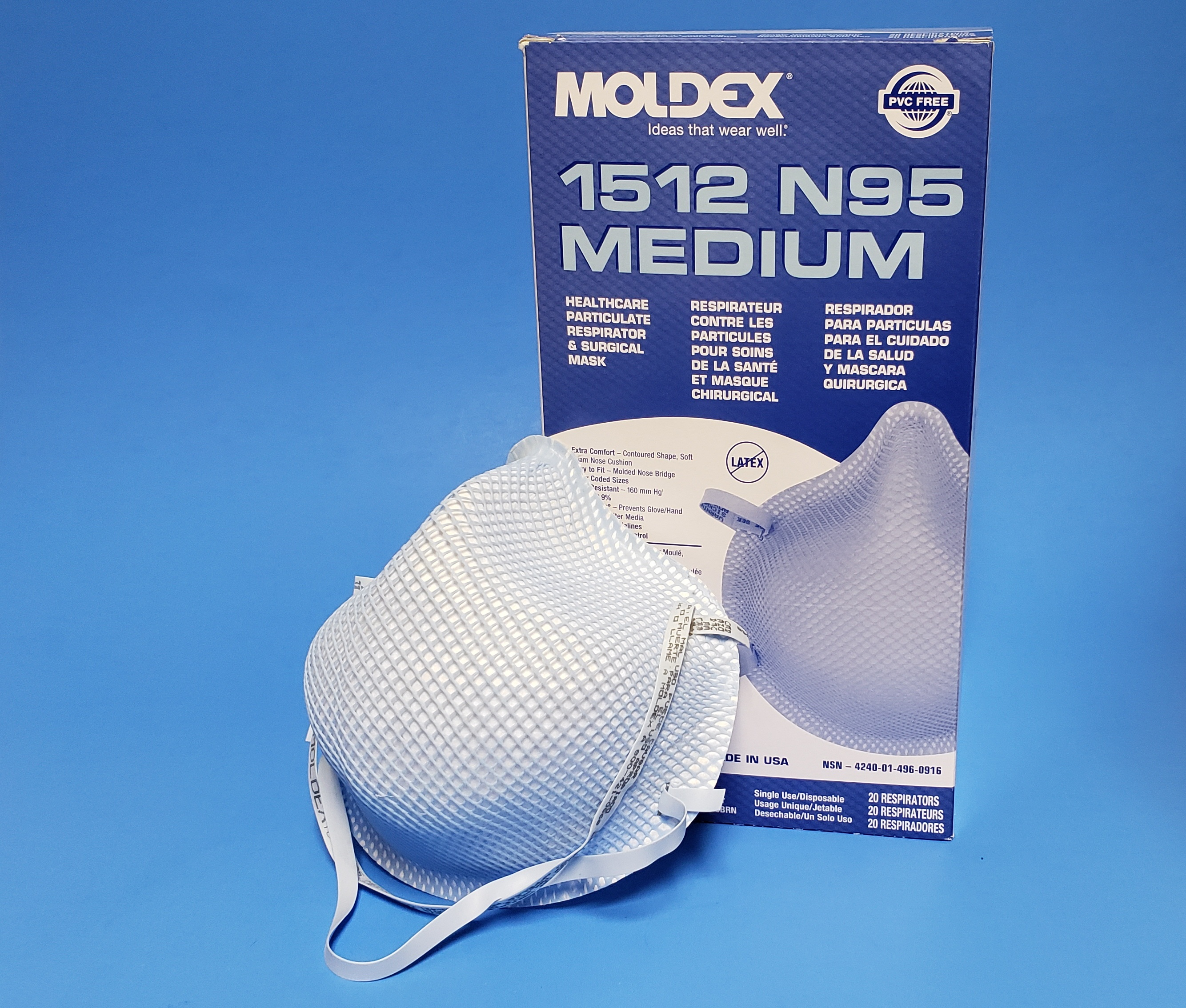
- Other name(s): N95, N95 mask
- Regulated by: National Institute for Occupational Safety and Health, United States Food and Drug Administration
- Regulation: 42 CFR 84, 21 CFR 878.4040
- NIOSH schedule: TC-84A
- [edit on Wikidata]

An N95 respirator is a disposable filtering facepiece respirator or reusable elastomeric respirator filter that meets the U.S. National Institute for Occupational Safety and Health (NIOSH) N95 standard of air filtration, filtering at least 95% of airborne particles that have a mass median aerodynamic diameter of 0.3 micrometers under 42 CFR 84, effective July 1995. (Note: N95/P100 respirator cautions and limitations:^{[N2]} A—Not for use in atmospheres containing less than 19.5% oxygen. B—Not for use in atmospheres immediately dangerous to life or health. N95 respirators are not SCBA respirators, which are sometimes designed for IDLH situations. Voluntary respirator users are advised by OSHA to read Appendix D of 1910.134 before using their respirator.)

A surgical N95 is also rated against fluids, and is regulated by the US Food and Drug Administration under 21 CFR 878.4040, in addition to NIOSH 42 CFR 84. The federal standard which created the N95 standard (42 CFR 84) was created to address shortcomings in the prior United States Bureau of Mines respirator testing standards, as well as in reaction to tuberculosis outbreaks in the 1980s-1990s resulting from the United States AIDS crisis. Since then, the N95 respirator has continued to be used as a source control measure in various pandemics that have been experienced in the United States and Canada, including the 2009 swine flu and the COVID-19 pandemic, and has been recommended by the EPA for protection against wildfire smoke.

The N95 respirator is commonly made of a fine mesh of synthetic polymer fibers, specifically a nonwoven polypropylene fabric. It is produced by melt blowing and forms the inner filtration layer that filters out hazardous particles. The N95 standard does not preclude alternative means of filtration, so long as the respirator meets N95 standards and is approved by NIOSH.

"N95" is a trademark of the United States Department of Health and Human Services. It is illegal in the United States to use the term "N95" without the approval of NIOSH. The "N" in the "N95" namesake indicates that it is non-resistant to oil, while the "95" refers to the mask being able to filter out 95% of particulates.

== Regulation ==
The N95 standard does not require that the respirator be resistant to oil; two other standards, R95 and P95, add that requirement.^{[N2]} The N95 type is the most common filtering facepiece respirator. Current filters are an example of a mechanical filter respirator, which provides protection against particulates but not against gases or vapors.

An authentic N95 respirator is marked with the text "NIOSH" or the NIOSH logo, the filter class ("N95"), and, for most filtering facepiece respirators (respirators with non-replaceable filters), a "TC" approval number of the form 84A-####, the approval number. All N95 respirators, regardless of type, must be listed on the NIOSH Certified Equipment List (CEL) or the NIOSH Trusted-Source page, and it must have headbands instead of ear loops.

N95 respirators are considered similar to other respirators regulated under non-U.S. jurisdictions, but slightly different criteria are used to certify their performance, such as the filter efficiency, test agent and flow rate, and permissible pressure drop. For example, FFP2 respirators of the European Union are required to meet at least 94% filtration, and KN95 respirators of China are expected to meet at least 95% filtration. NIOSH found that some products labeled "KN95" failed to meet these standards, some of them filtering out as little as one percent. Both the U.S. Food and Drug Administration and Health Canada require such KN95 products failing to meet the filtration standards to be re-labeled as "face masks" instead of "respirators", when being sold in the U.S. and Canada.

Canadian labor law normally requires NIOSH-approved respirators, like the N95.^{[S3]} In 2021, to reduce respirator shortages in Canada, the CSA Group released standard CSA Z94.4.1, allowing for the manufacture of CA-N95 respirators, which are not approved or cleared for use in the United States.

Examples of N95 respirators
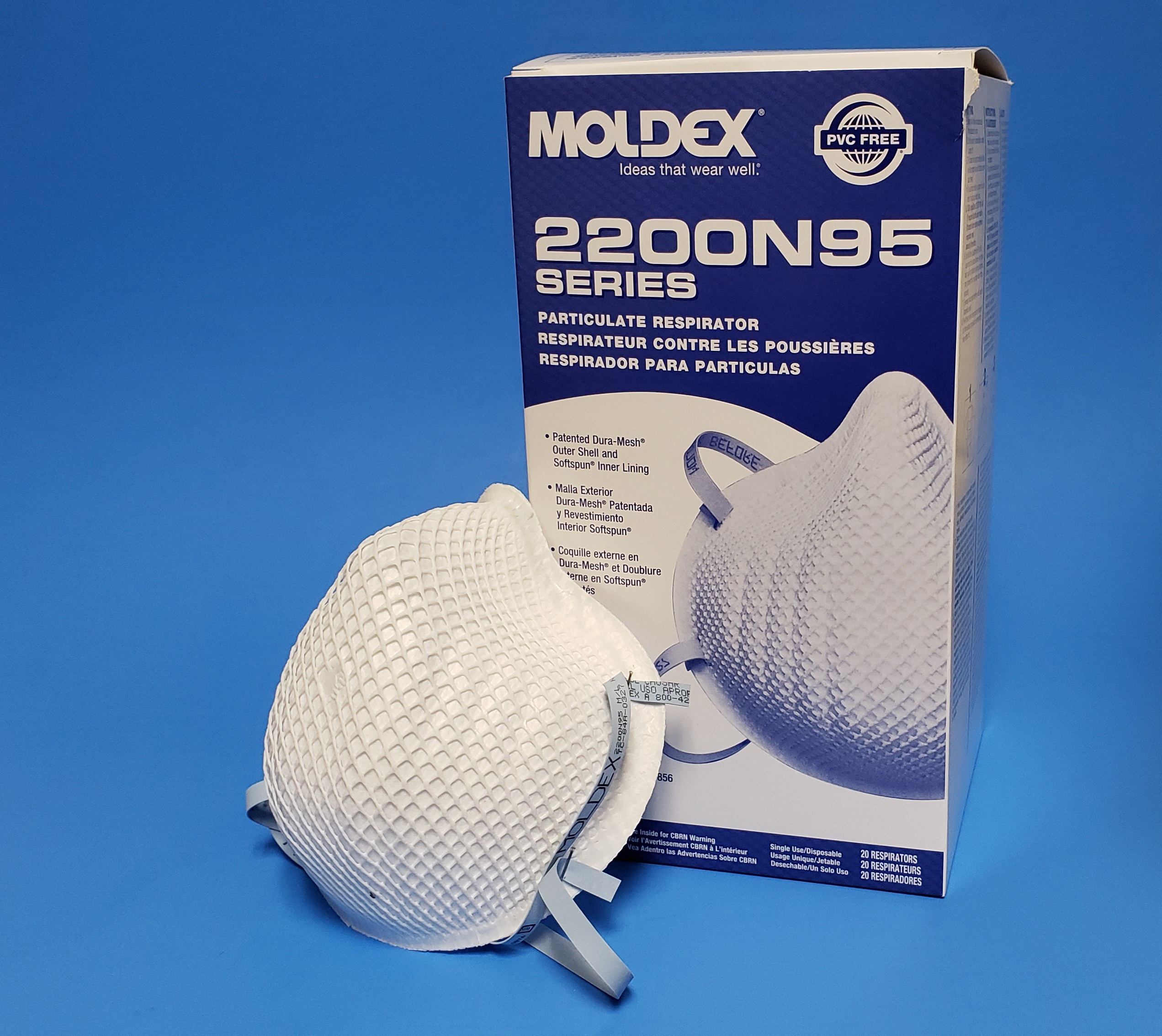
A Moldex 2200N95 disposable filtering facepiece respirator, with TC approval number on the strap, TC-84A-0327

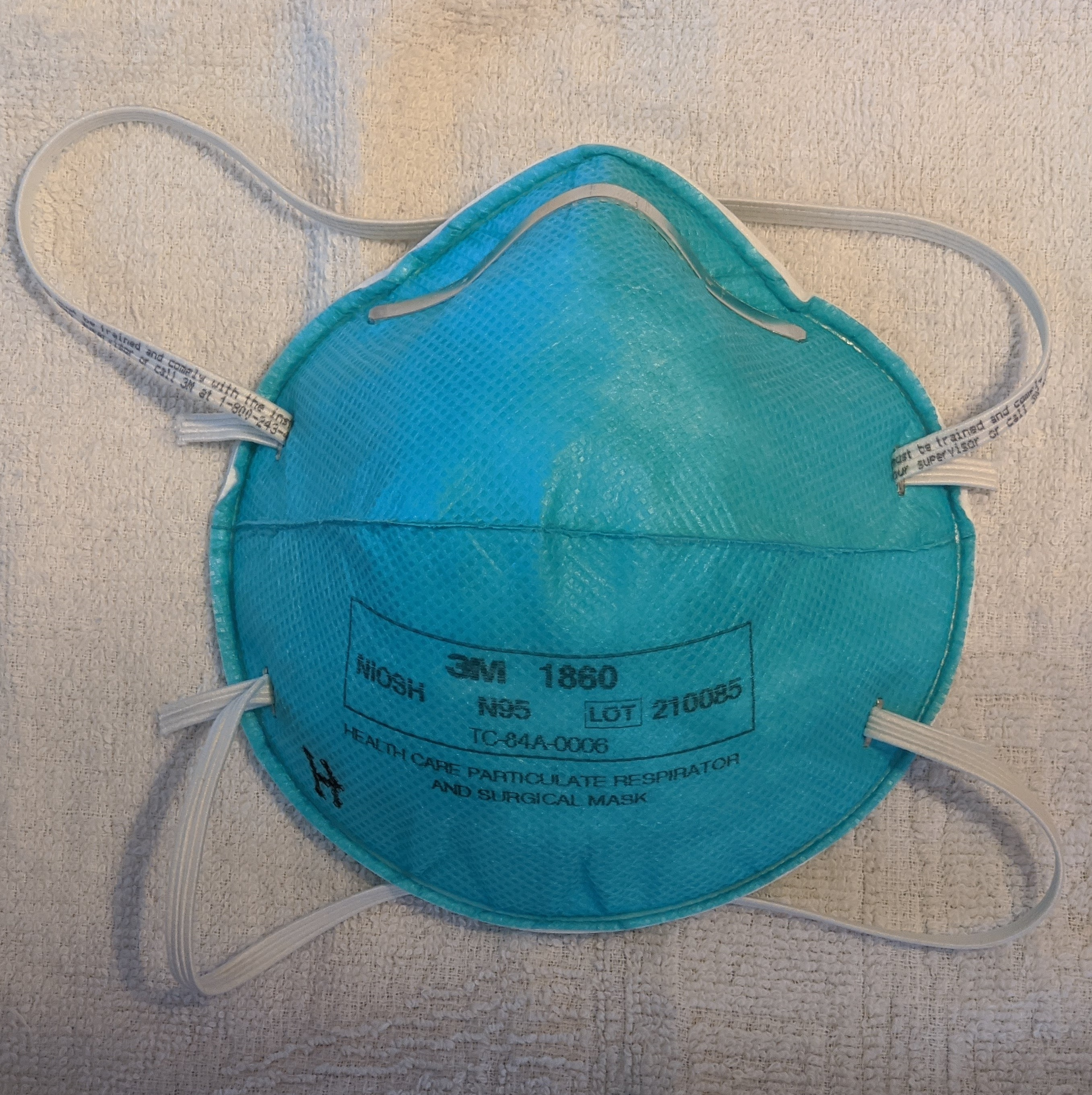
Surgical N95 respirators for use in health care are both approved by NIOSH (as a respirator) and cleared by FDA (as a fluid resistant surgical mask), TC-84A-0006

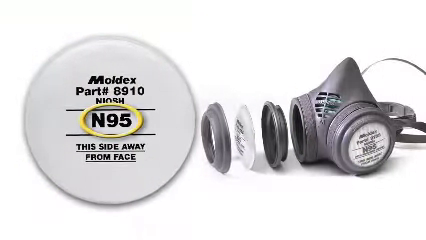
An elastomeric respirator with N95 filters installed. Note the lack of a TC number; according to OSHA, TC numbers may be located in the respirator manual or on respirator packaging.
Thoroughly check the NIOSH Certified Equipment List, and compare the look and feel to known good respirators
to verify that a suspect respirator is a NIOSH-approved N95.

== History ==
=== Early US respirator standards ===
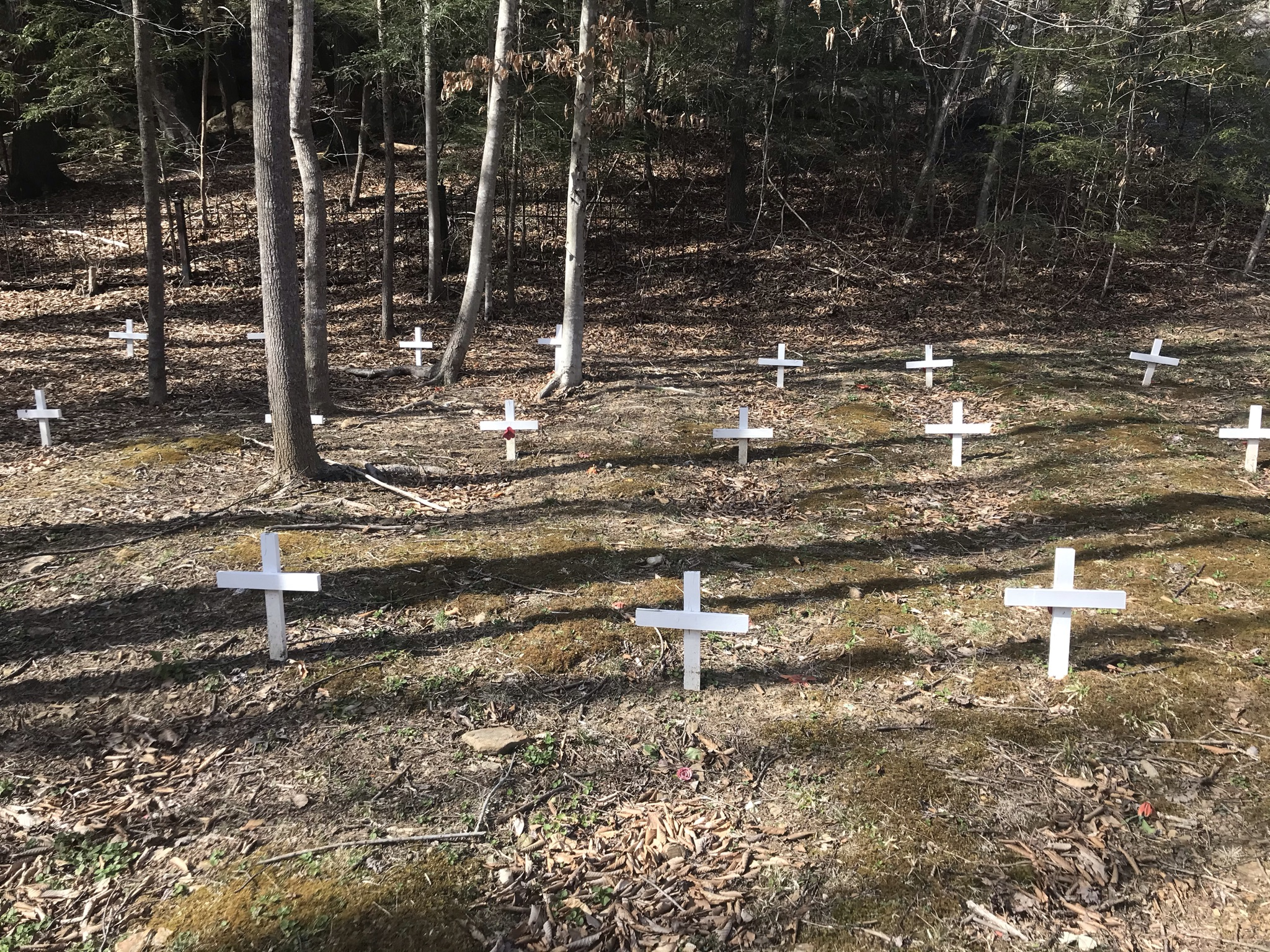
The Hawks Nest Tunnel disaster memorial grave site

Prior to the 1970s, respirator standards were under the purview of the US Bureau of Mines (USBM). An example of an early respirator standard, Type A, established in 1926, was intended to protect against mechanically generated dusts produced in mines. These standards were intended to obviate miner deaths, noted to have reached 3,243 by 1907. Prior to the Hawks Nest Tunnel disaster, these standards were merely advisory, as the USBM had no enforcement power at the time. After the disaster, an explicit approval program was established in 1934, along with the introduction of combination Type A/B/C respirator ratings, corresponding to Dusts/Fumes/Mists respectively, with Type D blocking all three, under 30 CFR 14 Schedule 21.

The Federal Coal Mine Health and Safety Act establishing MESA (later MSHA), the Occupational Safety and Health Act of 1970, establishing NIOSH, as well as other regulations established around the time, reshuffled regulatory authority for respirators, and moved regulations from Part 14 to Part 11 by 1972,^{[N2]} but nonetheless continued the use of USBM-era regulations.

=== 42 CFR 84 ===
Historically, respirators in the US had generally been approved by MESA/MSHA/NIOSH under federal regulation 30 CFR 11.^{[S1]} Plans for overhauling Part 11 regulations had been discussed since the late 1980s,^{[C1]} with the first proposed rule being published in the Federal Register in August 1987. From the start, respirator regulations were planned to be moved from Title 30 to Title 42, Part 84 in the Code of Federal Regulations, along with the elimination of joint-approval between NIOSH and MSHA. Respirator assigned protection factors were also to be updated, along with chemical cartridge requirements.

==== TB outbreak during the HIV epidemic ====
In 1992, the multidrug-resistant tuberculosis task force within the CDC was tasked with reducing the incidences of hospital acquired TB infections. TB infections had traditionally occurred mainly in underserved groups and areas, as well as the very young and elderly, and usually had around a 10% chance of turning into an active TB infection in a given person's lifetime. (Note: This refers to the MSHA's definition of 'HEPA' under 30 CFR Part 11 for respirators, which is 99.97% filtration of 0.3 micron DOP, not the EN 1822 or ISO 29463 definition of HEPA.)^{[C3]}

HIV/AIDS (as the outbreak in the US was in full force at the time) was noted to be one of the strongest factors for TB activation, since most TB outbreaks and mortalities reported at the time involved healthcare workers and patients infected with HIV. Respiratory protection and the performance of respirators were emphasized in the 1994 guidelines to controlling TB, which, at the time, were limited to respirators equipped with HEPA filters.^{[C3]}

To quickly address the HEPA-only respirator requirement for TB controls, stemming from the lack of biological protection in the existing 30 CFR 11 standards (which were mainly designed for miners), NIOSH aimed to have the proposed 42 CFR rule changes finished by the end of 1994. The proposal at the time would drop the HEPA classification for non-powered respirators, and add three respirator types, at the time called Type A, B and C, with filtration efficiencies of greater than or equal to 99.97%, 99%, and 95% respectively,^{[C1]} with Type C corresponding to the current N95 standard.

According to NIOSH, all the new respirator types proposed in 42 CFR 84, including Type C (later N95), would meet the CDC's requirement for protection against TB, and would provide avenues for cheaper NIOSH-approved respirators without the need for HEPA or NIOSH class-100 filters.^{[C1]}

After the passage of 42 CFR 84, a 1999 NIOSH guide for health care administrators noted that respirators selected for TB prevention under 42 CFR would likely be N95 respirators.

==== Approval of Part 84 and replacement of 30 CFR 11 ====
In July 1995, in response to respirators exhibiting "low initial efficiency levels", new 42 CFR 84 standards, including the N95 standard, were enforced under a three-year transition period,^{[C4]} ending in July 1998.^{[N2]} The standard for N95 respirators includes, but is not limited to, a filtration of at least 95% under a 0.3 micrometer^{[C4]} 200 milligram test load of sodium chloride. Standards and specifications are also subject to change.^{[N2]}

Once 42 CFR 84 was in effect, MSHA, under a proposed rule change to 30 CFR 11, 70, and 71, would withdraw from the approval process of rated respirators (outside of respirators used for mining).^{[C1]}

Respirator guidelines for TB were created by NIOSH as a result of the HIV/AIDS-induced outbreak in US hospitals
(Read on Wikisource)

N95 standard development is documented in the Federal Register, and the Code of Federal Regulations

NIOSH video on TB respirator usage, from the year 2000

== Use ==
=== Voluntary respirator use ===
When in an environment where no designated hazards are present, OSHA mandated respirator requirements are limited to Appendix D of 1910.134. Voluntary respirator users under Appendix D are only obligated to follow manufacturer instructions for maintenance, use, and warnings, and to keep track of the respirator. OSHA encourages the use of respirators, even if only voluntarily.^{[C5]}

OSHA advises voluntary respirator users receive a copy of 1910.134 Appendix D, as well as verify that the respirator used, be it powered-air purifying, self-contained, or facepiece-filtering, is not a potential health hazard.

=== During wildfires ===
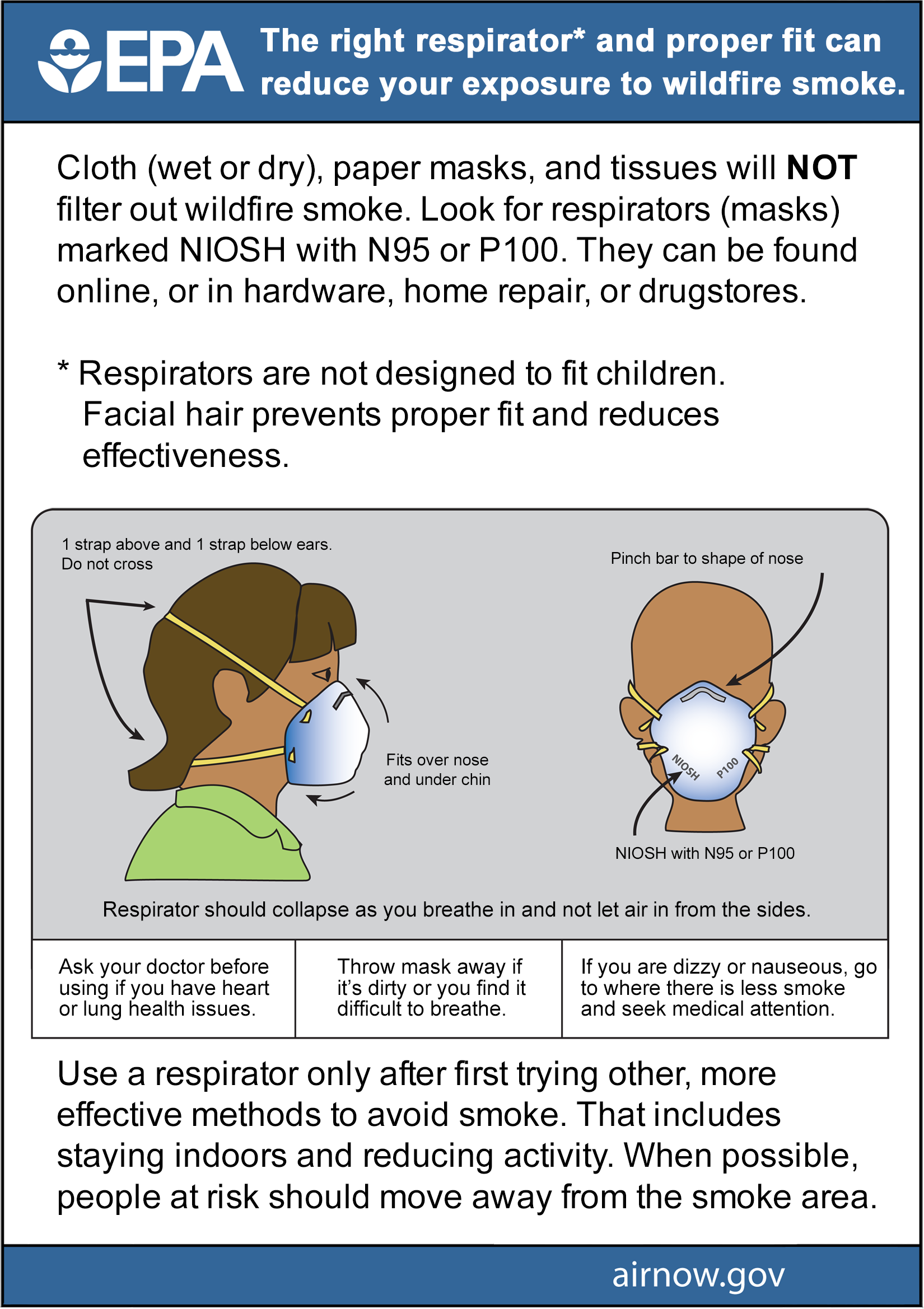
An EPA guide to respirator use during wildfires

The EPA recommends wearing a N95 or P100 respirator during a wildfire for protection against smoke. Masks to avoid are those with a single strap (also known as a dust mask) or a mask with earloops.

In addition to recommending NIOSH-approved respirators, the EPA also recommends building air purifiers to improve indoor air quality when commercial air purifiers are unavailable or unaffordable.

As of October 2024, NIOSH is in the process of developing a hazard review on smoke exposure among outdoor workers. The current draft, as of August 23, 2024, advises the use of N95 respirators, as well as engineering and administrative controls.

=== When mandated by employers ===
An infographic on three key factors required for a respirator to be effective

For men, certain beards can worsen fit.

Fit testing is a critical component to a respiratory protection program whenever workers use tight-fitting respirators in a hazardous environment. OSHA (US) requires an initial respirator fit test to identify the right model, style, and size respirator for each worker; as well, as annual fit tests. Additionally, tight-fitting respirators, including the N95, require a user seal check each time one is put on. Facial hair at the sealing area of the respirator will cause it to leak.

When use of a respirator is mandated by an employer, OSHA regulations require a medical evaluation. In the United States medical evaluation is required once, prior to initial fit testing and use, although it may need to be repeated if any adverse signs or symptoms are observed. Correct use of the respirator decreases the chances of airborne contamination by viruses.

For persons who are medically disqualified from negative-pressure respirators, or who cannot pass a fit test due to facial hair or other reasons, a powered air-purifying respirator is a possible alternative.

The rules on wearing respirators are similar in Canada. As of December 2024, SOR 86-304 dictates that, when employees are expected to do work in a hazardous environment, they must wear respirators approved by NIOSH, and must follow the procedures in CSA Z94.4 when fitting respirators.^{[S3]}

=== In industry ===
N95 respirators are also designed for industrial use in sectors such as mining and construction. They have also been shown to be effective as protection against engineered nanoparticles.

According to the NIOSH Respirator Selection Logic, respirators with filters in the N, R, and P series are recommended for concentrations of hazardous particulates that are greater than the relevant occupational exposure limit but less than the immediately dangerous to life or health level and the manufacturer's maximum use concentration, subject to the respirator having a sufficient assigned protection factor.

N series respirators, including the N95 respirator, are only effective in the absence of oil particles, such as lubricants, cutting fluids, or glycerine. For substances hazardous to the eyes, a respirator equipped with a full facepiece, helmet, or hood is recommended. They are not effective during firefighting, in oxygen-deficient atmosphere, or in an unknown atmosphere; in these situations a self-contained breathing apparatus is recommended instead. They are not effective against hazardous gases or vapors, for which a cartridge respirator is recommended.

In industrial settings where infectious disease exposure is not a concern, users can wear and reuse a filtering facepiece respirator until it is damaged, soiled, or causing noticeably increased breathing resistance, unless there is a manufacturer-specified duration of use. However, in laboratories at biosafety level 2 and higher, respirators are recommended to be discarded as hazardous waste after a single use.

Some industrial N95 series respirators have an exhaust valve to improve comfort, making exhalation easier, reducing leakage on exhalation and steaming-up of glasses. Research has indicated that wearing a valved N95 respirator does provide some source control to prevent the spread of diseases like COVID-19 when worn by asymptomatic infected users, at a level similar to that of a surgical or cloth facemask, although it is not equivalent to the performance of unvalved respirators. The same study found that "modifications [such as the use of an electrocardiogram pad or surgical tape secured over the valve from the inside of the FFR] can further reduce particle emissions".

=== In healthcare ===
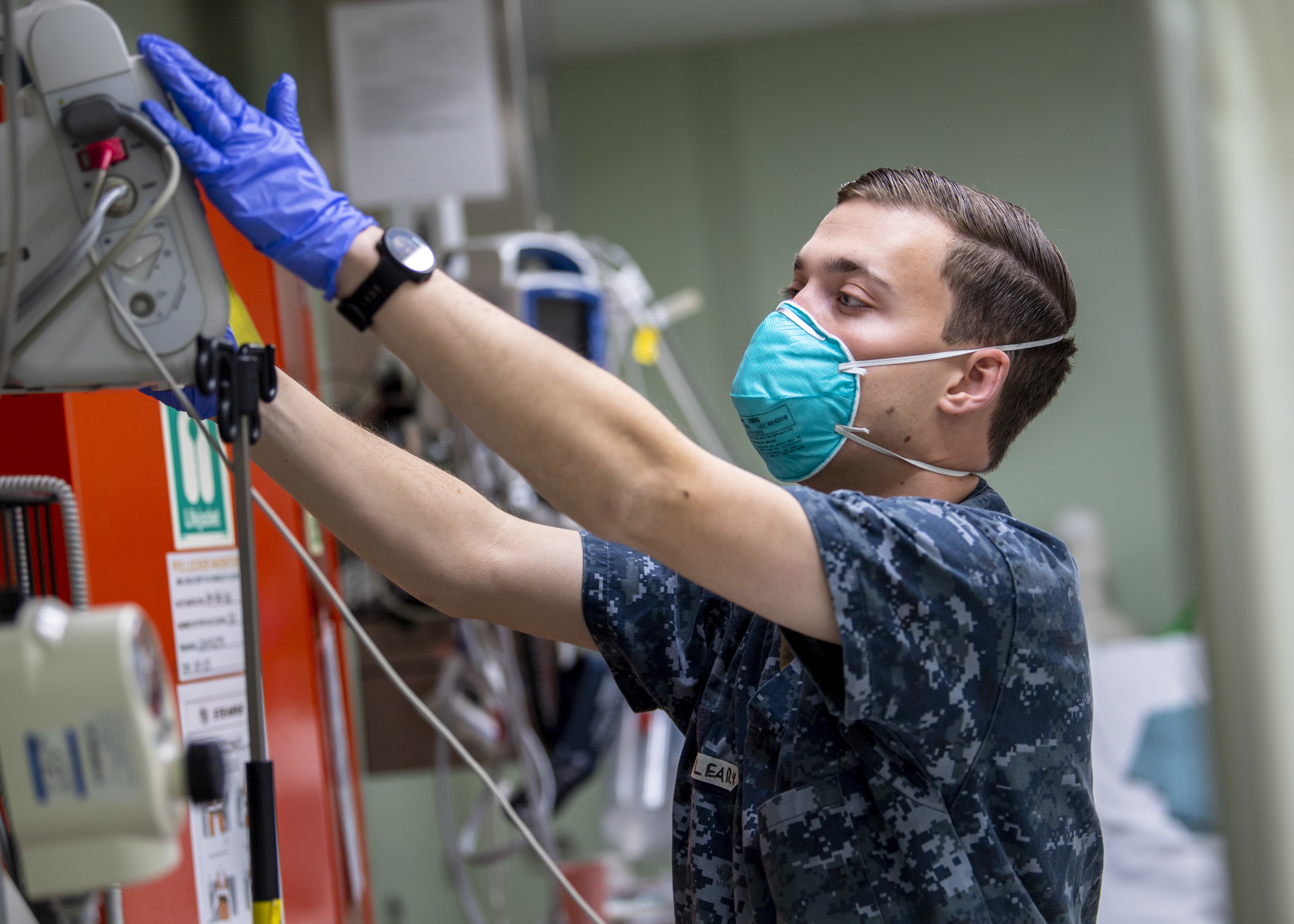
A U.S. Navy sailor wearing a surgical N95 respirator

Respirators used in healthcare are traditionally a specific variant called a surgical respirator, which is both approved by NIOSH as a respirator and cleared by the Food and Drug Administration as a medical device similar to a surgical mask. These may also be labeled "Surgical N95", "medical respirators", or "healthcare respirators". The difference lies in the extra fluid-resistant layer outside, typically colored blue. In addition to 42 CFR 84, surgical N95s are regulated under FDA regulation 21 CFR 878.4040.

In the United States, the Occupational Safety and Health Administration (OSHA) requires healthcare workers who are expected to perform patient activities with those suspected or confirmed to be infected with COVID-19 to wear respiratory protection, such as an N95 respirator. The CDC recommends the use of respirators with at least N95 certification to protect the wearer from inhalation of infectious particles including Mycobacterium tuberculosis, avian influenza, severe acute respiratory syndrome (SARS), pandemic influenza, and Ebola.

Unlike a respirator, a surgical mask is designed to provide barrier protection against droplets and does not have an air-tight seal and thus does not protect its wearer against airborne particles such as virus material to the same extent.

==== Use during shortages ====
During crisis situations where there is a shortage of N95 respirators, such as the COVID-19 pandemic, the U.S. Centers for Disease Control and Prevention (CDC) has recommended strategies for optimizing their use in healthcare settings. N95 respirators can be used beyond their manufacturer-designated shelf life, although components such as the straps and nose bridge material may degrade, making it particularly important that the wearer perform the expected seal check.

N95 respirators can be reused a limited number of times after being removed, as long as they have not been used during aerosol-generating procedures and are not contaminated with patients' bodily fluids, because this increases the risk of surface contamination with pathogens. The respirator manufacturer may recommend a maximum number of donnings or uses; if no manufacturer guidance is available, preliminary data suggests limiting to five uses per device. Respirators approved under standards used in other countries and are similar to NIOSH-approved N95 respirators—including FFP2 and FFP3 respirators regulated by the European Union—can be used.

According to NIOSH, respirators may still be used in crisis situations if standard respirator fit testing is not available, as a respirator will still provide better protection than a surgical mask or no mask. In this case, best practices for getting a good face seal include trying different models or sizes, using a mirror or asking a colleague to check that the respirator is touching the face, and doing multiple user seal checks.

Given that the global supply of personal protective equipment (PPE) may be insufficient during a pandemic, in 2020, the World Health Organization recommended minimizing the need for PPE through telemedicine; physical barriers such as clear windows; allowing only those involved in direct care to enter a room with a COVID-19 patient; using only the PPE necessary for the specific task; continuing use of the same respirator without removing it while caring for multiple patients with the same diagnosis; monitoring and coordinating the PPE supply chain; and discouraging the use of masks for asymptomatic individuals.

When it is no longer possible for all healthcare workers to wear N95 respirators when caring for a COVID-19 patient, the CDC recommends that respirators be prioritized for workers performing aerosol-generating procedures on symptomatic persons, and those within three feet of an unmasked symptomatic person. Under these conditions, masking of symptomatic patients with at least a surgical mask and maintaining distance from the patient are particularly important to reduce the risk of transmission. When no respirators are left, workers who are at higher risk for severe illness may be excluded from caring for patients, and workers who have clinically recovered from COVID-19 may be preferred to care for patients.

Portable fans with HEPA filters may also be used to increase ventilation in isolation rooms when surgical masks are being used in place of respirators. If neither respirators nor surgical masks are available, as a last resort, it may be necessary for healthcare workers to use masks that have never been evaluated or approved by NIOSH or homemade masks, such as cloth face masks, although caution should be exercised when considering this option.

==== Decontamination ====
Disposable filtering facepiece respirators such as N95 respirators are not approved for routine decontamination and reuse as standard of care. However, their decontamination and reuse may need to be considered as a crisis capacity strategy to ensure continued availability.

There have been efforts to evaluate cleaning methods for respirators in emergency shortages, although there is concern that this may reduce filter performance, or affect mask fit by deforming the mask. Duke University researchers have published a method for cleaning N95 respirators without damaging them using vaporized hydrogen peroxide to allow reuse for a limited number of times. Battelle received an Emergency Use Authorization from the U.S. Food and Drug Administration for its technology used to sterilize N95 respirators.

OSHA does not currently have any standards for disinfecting N95 respirators. NIOSH recommends that during shortages N95 respirators may be used up to five times without cleaning them, as long as aerosol-generating procedures are not performed, and respirators are not contaminated with patients' bodily fluids. Contamination can be reduced by wearing a cleanable face shield over an N95 respirator, as well as using clean gloves when donning and seal-checking a used N95 respirator and discarding the gloves immediately after. According to CDC, ultraviolet germicidal irradiation, vaporous hydrogen peroxide and moist heat showed the most promise as potential methods to decontaminate N95 respirators and other filtering facepiece respirators.

==== Contrast with surgical mask ====
An infographic on the difference between surgical masks and N95 respirators

A surgical mask is a loosely-placed, unsealed barrier, meant to stop droplets, and other liquid-borne particles from the mouth and nose that may contain pathogens.

A surgical mask may not block all particles, due to the lack of fit between the surface of the face mask and the face. The filtration efficiency of a surgical mask ranges between 10% and 90% for any given manufacturer, when measured using tests required for NIOSH certification. A study found that 80–100% of subjects failed an OSHA-accepted qualitative fit test, and a quantitative test showed between 12 and 25% leakage.

A CDC study found that in public indoor settings, consistently wearing a respirator was linked to an 83% lower risk of testing positive for COVID-19, as compared to a 66% reduction when using surgical masks, and 56% for cloth.

== Later history ==
=== HIV/AIDS and TB epidemic ===
Under a rule proposed by OSHA in 1997, this sign would be paired with the words "No Admittance Without Wearing a Type N95 or More Protective Respirator" near where tuberculosis was present

While NIOSH was busy finishing 42 CFR 84 respirator regulations (including the N95), other agencies and groups (such as the SEIU) were advocating for new standards for the prevention of TB. In 1992, the Labor Coalition to Fight TB in the Workplace started lobbying OSHA to create advisories and formal rules to protect workers from TB. The group was especially concerned about the rise of multidrug-resistant tuberculosis, which would require more rigorous standards to mitigate, especially since they felt that the 1990 CDC guidelines for TB were not being properly followed. The CDC eventually revised and released new TB guidelines in 1994, and in 1995 and 1996, meetings started to be held between OSHA and various stakeholders for a new TB standard, borrowing heavily from the CDC's work.

In 1997, OSHA proposed new rule changes for industries affected by the spread of tuberculosis, like hospitals, where many patients infected with TB were also infected with HIV. The proposed rule would require signage that includes a STOP sign, with red background, white symbols, and a set of words warning people to wear "N95 or more protective" respirators (under 42 CFR 84) near isolation rooms where TB infection is likely. Additional notices could be added at the discretion of an employer, so long as it did not contradict the required wording.

OSHA withdrew the proposal in 2003, owing to commenters and reviewers pointing to a likely overstating of risk, declining rates of TB in the years following the proposal, as well as compliance without a rule by OSHA.^{[C7]}

=== Shortages from expanding asbestos litigation ===
NIOSH certifies B Readers, people qualified to testify or provide evidence in mesothelioma personal injury lawsuits, in addition to regulating respirators. However, since 2000, the increasing scope of claims related to mesothelioma started to include respirator manufacturers to the tune of 325,000 cases, despite the primary use of respirators being to prevent asbestos and silica-related diseases. Most of these cases were not successful, or reached settlements of around $1000 per litigant, well below the cost of mesothelioma treatment.

One reason is due to the fact that respirator manufacturers are not allowed to modify a respirator once it is certified by NIOSH. In one case, a jury ruled against 3M for a respirator that was initially approved for asbestos, but was quickly disapproved once OSHA permissible exposure limits for asbestos changed. Combined with testimony that the plaintiff rarely wore a respirator around asbestos, the lack of evidence, and the limitation of liability from static NIOSH approval, the case was overturned.

Nonetheless, the costs of litigation reduced the margins for respirators, which was blamed for supply shortages for N95 respirators for anticipated pandemics, like avian influenza, during the 2000s.

=== SARS pandemic ===
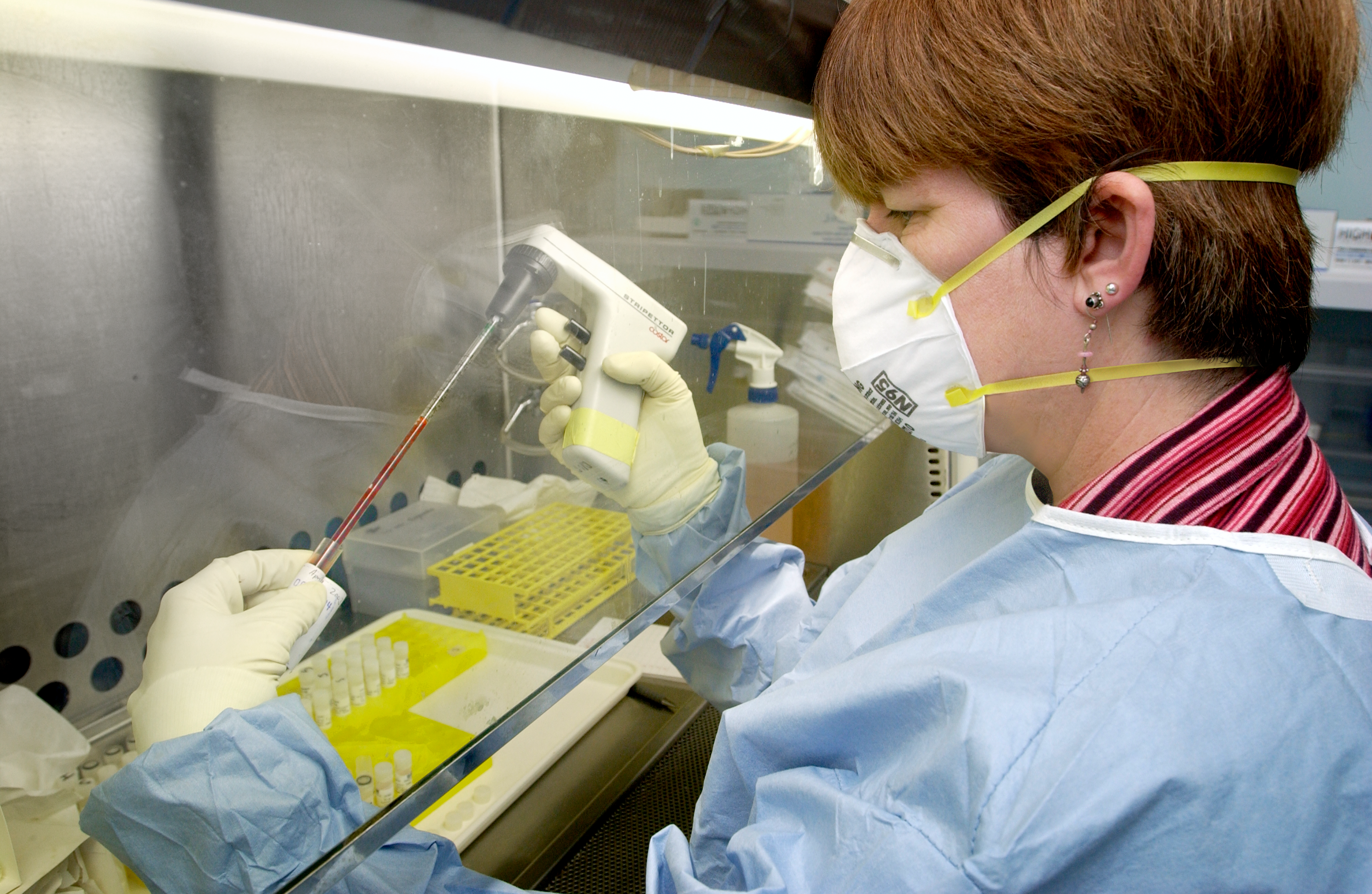
A lab worker wearing an N95 respirator during the SARS outbreak

In 2003, in response to the SARS outbreak, the United States CDC advised healthcare workers to wear N95 respirators. Despite this advice, a patient who had traveled from Ontario exposed six healthcare workers in Pennsylvania following contact tracing by the CDC, though fitted N95 respirators were worn at a hospital upon suspicion of SARS.

Following the SARS outbreak in the US, US Senate hearings started to be held proposing the Strategic National Stockpile start stocking PPE and N95 respirators in the event of another SARS outbreak. It was noted at the time that there were few N95 respirator manufacturers, potentially exacerbating a shortage in a crisis.

Meanwhile, in Canada, discussions with Ontario EMS and New York Department of Health in 2004 noted that infected emergency medical personnel failed to properly use N95 respirators. According to Ontario SARS commission final report, this was likely due to confusion over infectious disease control, confusion over respirator procedures, and the insinuation by various infection control practitioners that N95 respirators were not necessary. However, the report concludes, from laws preceding SARS, healthcare workers were obligated to wear N95 respirators throughout the outbreak, despite suggestions to the contrary. A paper published in the New England Journal of Medicine concluded that universal use of N95 respirators, as well as additional infection control measures, ended the SARS outbreak in Ontario.

=== 2007 CDC/HICPAC infection control guidelines ===
In 2007, the CDC HICPAC published a set of guidelines, called the 2007 Guideline for Isolation Precautions: Preventing Transmission of Infectious Agents in Healthcare Settings, suggesting that use of "barrier precautions", defined as "masks, gowns, [and] gloves", would not be required, so long as it was limited to "routine entry", patients were not confirmed to be infected, and no aerosol-generating procedures were being done. "Standard precautions" requiring the use of masks, face shields, and/or eye protection, would be needed if there was potential for the spraying of bodily fluids, like during intubation.

The guidelines are the same regardless of the type of pathogen, but the guidelines also note that, based on the experience of SARS-CoV in Toronto, that "N95 or higher respirators may offer additional protection to those exposed to aerosol-generating procedures and high risk activities".

Separate from "barrier precautions" and "standard precautions" are "airborne precautions", a protocol for "infectious agents transmitted by the airborne route", like with SARS-CoV and tuberculosis, requiring 12 air changes per hour for new facilities, and use of fitted N95 respirators. These measures are used whenever someone is suspected of harboring an "infectious agent".

=== H1N1 swine flu pandemic ===
In May 2009, in response to the H1N1 swine flu outbreak, the CDC authorized the release of N95 respirators from the Strategic National Stockpile, and the waiving of certain quality controls on certain models of newly manufactured N95 respirators, provided they were documented "for use during the swine flu emergency". Initially, the CDC's interim guide for H1N1 recommended N95 respirators for the prevention of H1N1, but stopped short of recommending respirators for groups not deemed "at increased risk of severe illness from influenza", except for occupational use in healthcare. NIOSH also emphasized the differences in fit between an N95 respirator and a surgical mask for prevention against the flu.

For those in the general public wishing to wear N95 respirators, properly wearing a N95 was noted to be difficult, but the tendency for people to distance themselves from those wearing masks was said to complement the six-foot social distancing rules at the time.

==== H1N1 respirator/mask randomized control trials ====
Around the time of the H1N1 pandemic, randomized control trial studies of masks started being done, comparing surgical masks and N95 respirators with the tendency for medical staff to be infected by the flu. One paper concluded that N95s were better than surgical masks, but its results were later called into question. Another paper claimed that protection provided by an N95 respirator compared similarly to a surgical mask, but the study did not control health care personnel potentially being exposed outside, without respirators, via the community. (Note: A later preprint study by the same lead author (Loeb) claiming the same thing was found to be fraudulent in multiple ways, including use of unregistered study sites, repeated alteration of mathematical analysis methods to obscure the evidence in the data, as well as concealment of conflicts of interest; the actual data in that study showed that N95s were superior.)

After the 2009 H1N1 flu season, the CDC issued guidelines recommending surgical masks instead, after complaints were leveled by various groups on the effectiveness of surgical masks compared to N95 respirators, along with complaints about comfort. The new recommendations were met with approval by groups like the Society for Healthcare Epidemiology of America.

=== COVID-19 pandemic ===
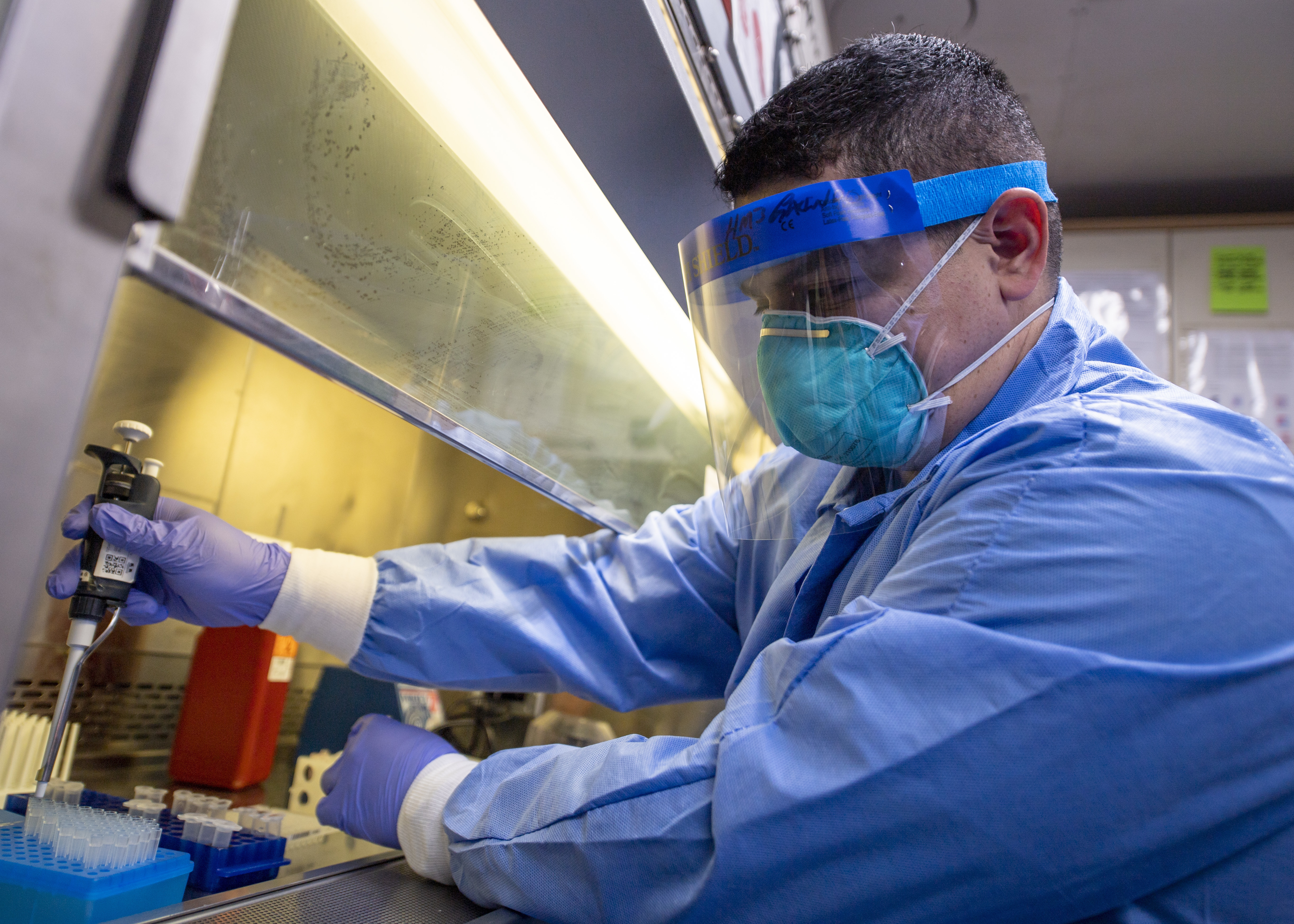
A Hospital Corpsman wearing a Surgical N95 during the initial months of the COVID-19 pandemic

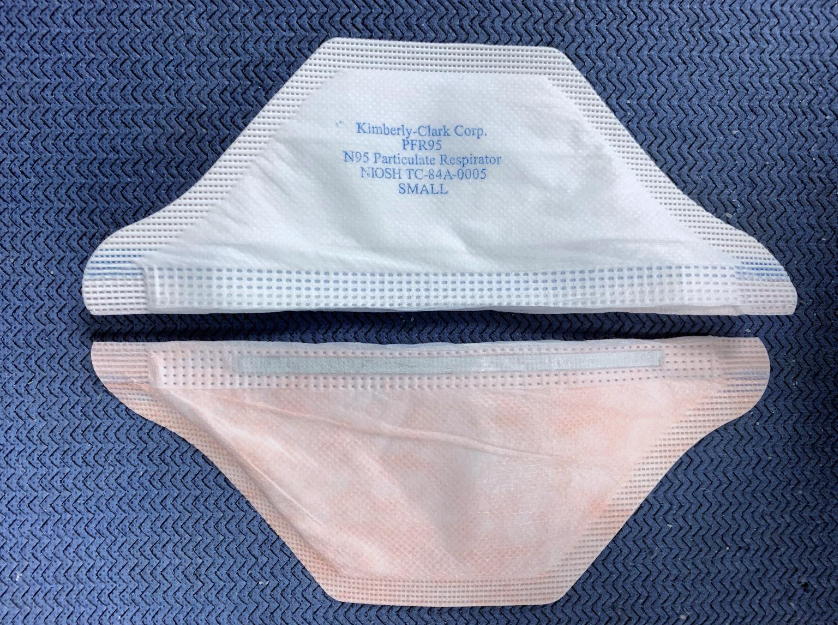
Two 'Duckbill' style respirators

During the COVID-19 pandemic, the mask and respirator market rapidly grew, along with counterfeit respirators. NIOSH, on behalf of the Department of Health and Human Services, filed a trademark application on June 17, 2020, for various 42 CFR 84 trademarks, including the N95, allowing NIOSH to enforce rules on counterfeit masks outside of rules defined in 42 CFR 84. The trademarks were registered in 2022.

==== Global shortages during the COVID-19 pandemic ====
The Strategic National Stockpile had not been refilled following the H1N1 pandemic, and by April 2020, Department of Homeland Security officials reported that the supply of respirators and other PPE in the stockpile was nearly gone. Respirators came to be in short supply and high demand during the COVID-19 pandemic, causing price gouging and hoarding, often leading to confiscation of masks. Production of N95 respirators was limited due to constraints on the supply of nonwoven polypropylene fabric as well as the cessation of exports from China.

Also in early April 2020, the United States federal government, invoking the Defense Production Act of 1950, ordered 3M to stop exporting N95 respirators to customers in Canada and Latin America, and to keep them within the U.S. instead. However, 3M refused, saying: "Ceasing all export of respirators produced in the United States would likely cause other countries to retaliate and do the same, as some have already done. If that were to occur, the net number of respirators being made available to the United States would actually decrease. That is the opposite of what we and the administration, on behalf of the American people, both seek."

==== Dropping of mask mandates in hospitals ====
By 2023, The New York Times noted that the CDC had dropped mandates for masks in hospitals during COVID, limiting the COVID policies to an advisory role. Use of masks for source control is still recommended in times of high viral activity, but the CDC did not provide numbers for benchmarks. The new policies are thought, according to The New York Times, based on various citations to medical literature, to increase mortality among vulnerable patients, especially those with cancer.

The New York Times article cites a paper published in 2023, that suggests the high mortality of cancer patients following the Omicron wave may have been due to relaxing of policies preventing COVID-19 transmission (like source control policies). The 2023 paper also cites a research letter published in 2022, that suggests that the surge of COVID-19 cases in hospitals may have been due to the high contagiousness of Omicron, an article which suggested a high secondary attack rate relative to Delta, and papers finding increased mortality of cancer patients due to higher rates of breakthrough infections.

Also in 2023, new draft guidelines were proposed by the CDC HICPAC, to update the pre-COVID 2007 Guideline for Isolation Precautions: Preventing Transmission of Infectious Agents in Healthcare Settings. (Note: See Source control (respiratory disease)#Pre-COVID) The proposed updates were met with disapproval by the National Nurses United union, as they felt the changes did not go far enough. Changes included clarifying by adding "source control" as a qualification for the use of "barrier precautions".

==== Criticism of N95 RCTs and other controversial studies ====
Following previous H1N1 randomized control trials comparing N95s and surgical masks, new RCTs were published. Major flaws were noted, including contraction of virus outside hospital, the lack of controls over time in hospital, and assumptions made about transmission via droplets instead of aerosols.

In 2024, a paper published in the American Society for Microbiology Clinical Microbiology Reviews stated there were harms in continued undue weight being placed on RCTs and flawed mask studies in a social and political context, as retracted papers continue to be circulated to justify certain masking behaviors and beliefs. One retracted JAMA paper garnered a million views, while another retracted paper in Frontiers Public Health continues to circulate across social media.

=== Avian influenza outbreak ===
==== Among dairy workers ====
The CDC recommends farm workers wear PPE, including N95 or better respirators, when working with farm animals potentially infected with H5N1. However, outbreaks of H5N1 have continued among dairy workers, likely due to workers' fear of retaliation by their employers, and reluctance by employers and state officials to allow CDC investigators into dairy farms.

== See also ==
- Air purifier
  - Corsi–Rosenthal Box
- Division of Industrial Hygiene
- Health belief model
- NIOSH
- Respirator assigned protection factors
  - Permissible exposure limit
- Source control (respiratory disease)
- Toxic tort
- Face masks during the COVID-19 pandemic
  - Face masks during the COVID-19 pandemic in the United States
  - Impact of the COVID-19 pandemic on neurological, psychological and other mental health outcomes
- Workplace hazard controls for COVID-19

== Explanatory notes ==
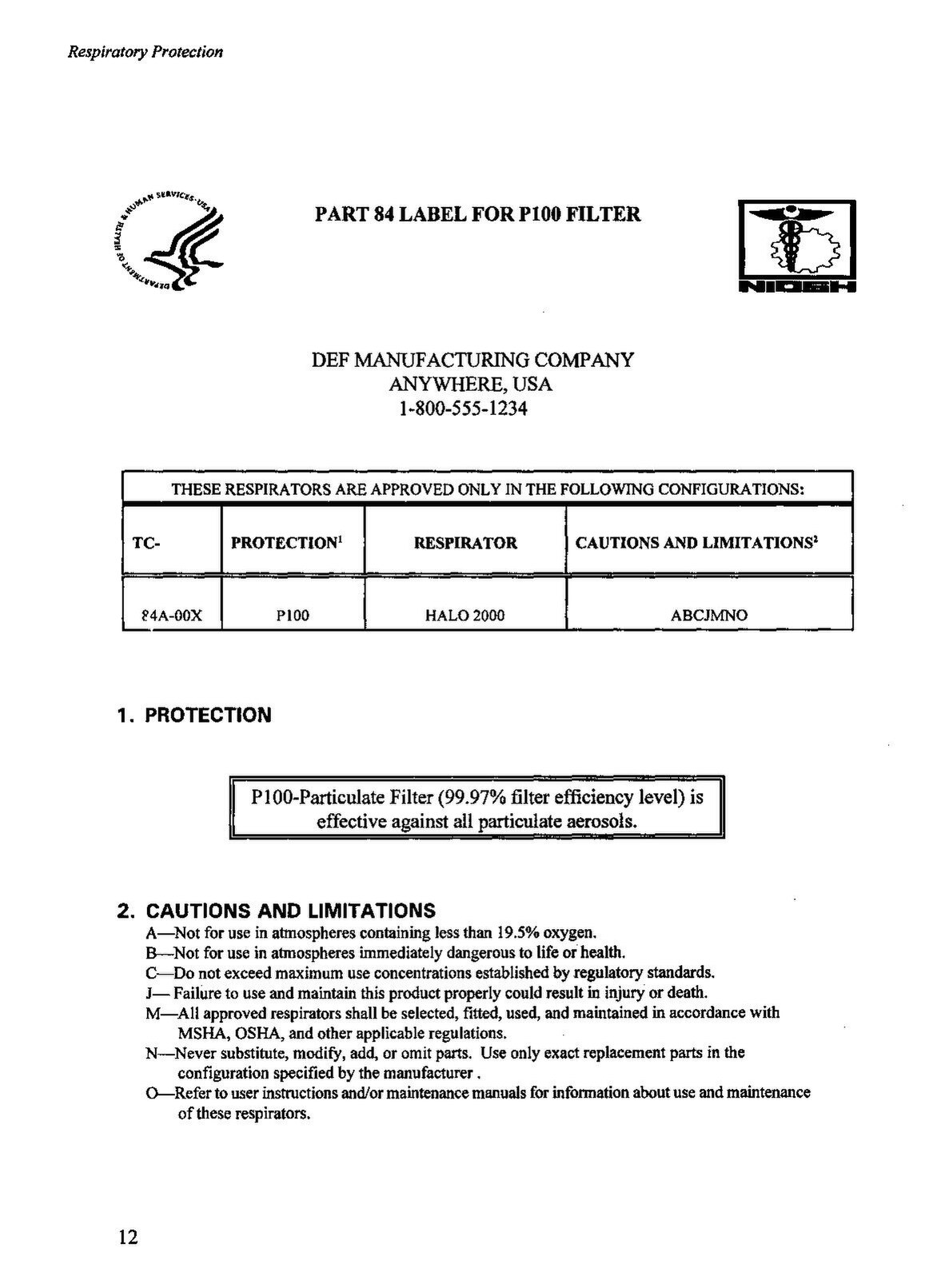
NIOSH-provided example of P100 respirator limitations
