= Workplace hazard controls for COVID-19 =

Prevention measures for COVID-19

External videos
- COVID-19 and the Hierarchy of Controls

Hazard controls for COVID-19 in workplaces are the application of occupational safety and health methodologies for hazard controls to the prevention of COVID-19. Multiple layers of controls are recommended, including measures such as remote work and flextime, personal protective equipment (PPE) and face coverings, social distancing, and enhanced cleaning programs. Recently, engineering controls have been emphasized, particularly stressing the importance of HVAC systems meeting a minimum of 5 air changes per hour with ventilation or MERV-13 filters, as well as the installation of UVGI systems in public areas.

== Hazard controls ==
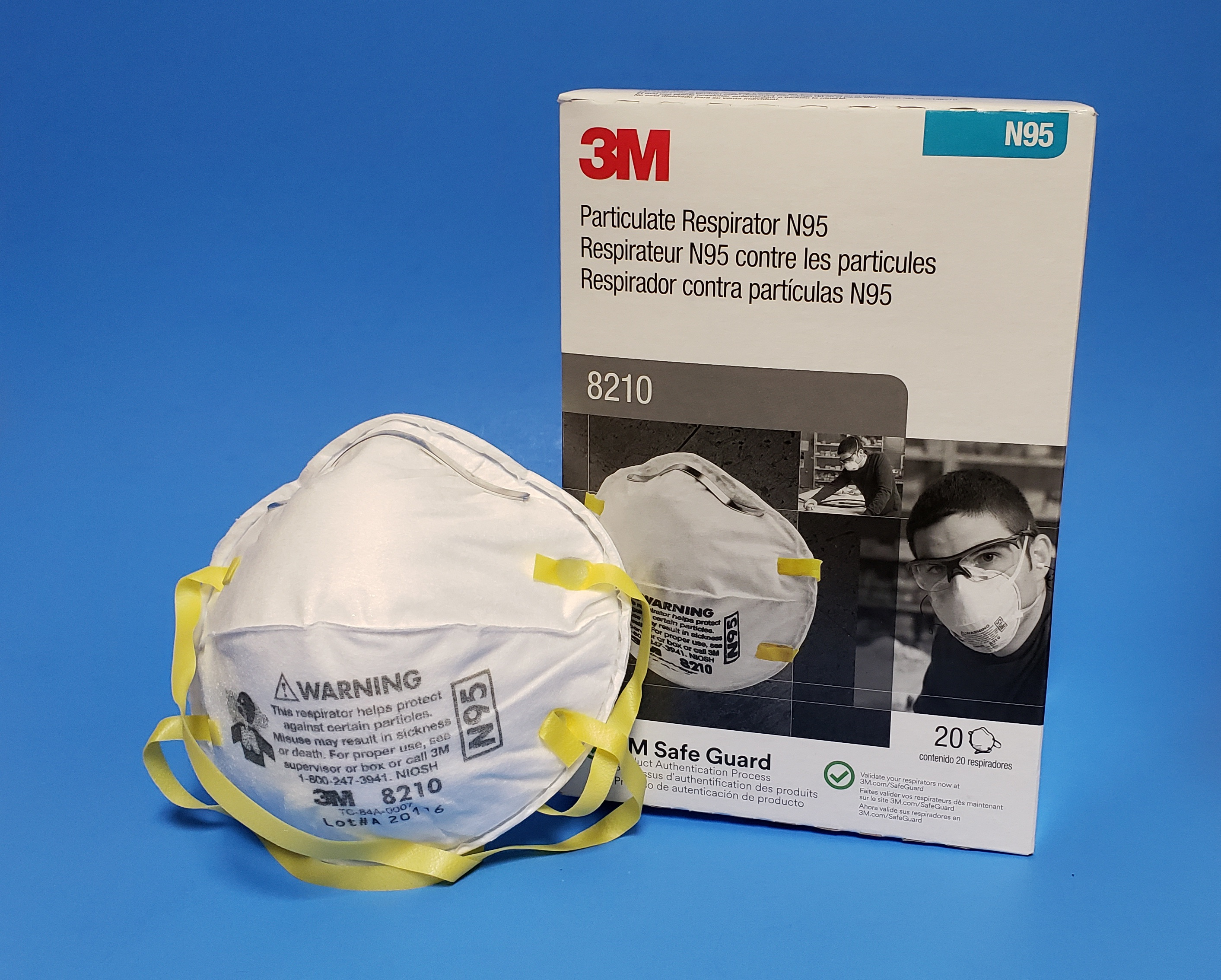
An N95 mask.

The U.S. Occupational Safety and Health Administration (OSHA) recommends implementing multiple layers of controls, including measures such as remote work and flextime, engineering controls (especially increased ventilation), administrative controls such as vaccination policies, personal protective equipment (PPE), face coverings, social distancing, and enhanced cleaning programs with a focus on high-touch surfaces.

Preliminary evidence suggests that fully vaccinated people can become infectious and can spread the virus to others. The U.S. Centers for Disease Control and Prevention (CDC) recommends that fully vaccinated people can reduce their risk of becoming infected and potentially spreading it to others by:

- wearing a mask in public indoor settings in areas of substantial or high transmission;
- choosing to wear a mask regardless of level of transmission, particularly if individuals are at risk or have someone in their household who is at increased risk of severe disease or not fully vaccinated; and
- getting tested 3–5 days following a known exposure to someone with suspected or confirmed COVID-19 and wearing a mask in public indoor settings for 14 days after exposure or until a negative test result.

Along with vaccination, key controls to help protect unvaccinated and other at-risk workers include removing from the workplace all infected people, all people experiencing COVID symptoms, and any people who are not fully vaccinated who have had close contact with someone with COVID-19 and have not tested negative for COVID-19 immediately if symptoms develop and again at least 5 days after the contact (in which case they may return 7 days after contact). Fully vaccinated people who have had close contact should get tested for COVID-19 3–5 days after exposure and be required to wear face coverings for 14 days after their contact unless they test negative for COVID-19.

Additional fundamental controls that protect unvaccinated and other at-risk workers include maintaining ventilation systems, implementing physical distancing, and properly using face coverings, and proper cleaning. Fully vaccinated people in areas of substantial or high transmission should be required to wear face coverings inside as well. Employees may request reasonable accommodations, absent an undue hardship, if they are unable to comply with safety requirements due to a disability.

There is low quality evidence that supports making improvements or modifications to personal protective equipment in order to help decrease contamination. Examples of modifications include adding tabs to masks or gloves to ease removal and designing protective gowns so that gloves are removed at the same time. In addition, there is weak evidence that the following PPE approaches or techniques may lead to reduced contamination and improved compliance with PPE protocols: Wearing double gloves, following specific doffing (removal) procedures such as those from the CDC, and providing people with spoken instructions while removing PPE.

== Workers' rights ==
In the United States, under the General Duty Clause of the Occupational Safety and Health Act of 1970, employers are responsible for providing a safe and healthy workplace free from recognized hazards likely to cause death or serious physical harm, which includes COVID-19. In addition, OSHA's Emergency Temporary Standard applies required measures to most settings where any employee provides healthcare services or healthcare support services. Section 11(c) of the OSH prohibits employers from retaliating against workers for raising concerns about safety and health conditions, and OSHA encourages workers who suffer such retaliation to submit a complaint to OSHA's Whistleblower Protection Program within the legal time limits.

On July 15, 2020, Virginia adopted binding safety regulations on COVID-19, the first such regulations in the United States. The regulations includes mandates about control measures and prohibits retaliation against workers for expressing concern about infection risk, and provides for fines of up to US$130,000 for companies found in violation. As of July 2020, Oregon adopted a timeline that targets the establishment of COVID-19 regulations for September 1.

== Historical guidance before availability of COVID-19 vaccines ==
COVID-19 outbreaks have been responsible for several effects within the workplace. Workers may be absent from work due to becoming sick, needing to care for others, or from fear of possible exposure. Patterns of commerce may change, both in terms of what goods are demanded, and the means of acquiring these goods (such as shopping at off-peak hours or through delivery or drive-through services). Lastly, shipments of items from geographic areas severely affected by COVID-19 may be interrupted.

An infectious disease preparedness and response plan can be used to guide protective actions. Such plans address the levels of risk associated with various worksites and job tasks, including sources of exposure, risk factors arising from home and community settings, and risk factors of individual workers such as old age or chronic medical conditions. They also outline controls necessary to address those risks, and contingency plans for situations that may arise as a result of outbreaks. Infectious disease preparedness and response plans may be subject to national or subnational recommendations. Objectives for response to an outbreak include reducing transmission among staff, protecting people who are at higher risk for adverse health complications, maintaining business operations, and minimizing adverse effects on other entities in their supply chains. The disease severity in the community where the business is located affects the responses taken.

=== All workplaces ===
In many workplaces, groups share many hours of the day indoors. These conditions can facilitate the transmission of disease, but also control it through workplace practices and policies. Identifying industries or particular jobs that have the highest potential exposure to a specific risk can help in the development of interventions to control or prevent the spread of diseases such as COVID-19.

According to the U.S. Occupational Safety and Health Administration (OSHA), lower exposure risk jobs have minimal occupational contact with the public and other coworkers. Basic infection prevention measures recommended for all workplaces include frequent and thorough hand washing, encouraging workers to use sick leave if they are sick, respiratory etiquette including covering coughs and sneezes, providing tissues and trash receptacles, preparing for remote work or shift work if needed, discouraging workers from using others' tools and equipment, and maintaining routine cleaning and disinfecting of the work environment. Prompt identification and isolation of potentially infectious individuals is a critical step in protecting workers, customers, visitors, and others at a worksite. The U.S. Centers for Disease Control and Prevention (CDC) recommends that employees who have symptoms of acute respiratory illness are to stay home until they are free of fever, signs of a fever, and any other symptoms, and that sick leave policies are flexible, permit employees to stay home to care for a sick family member, and that employees are aware of these policies.

There are also psychosocial hazards arising from anxiety or stress from worries about contracting COVID-19, the illness or death of a relative or friend, changes in work patterns, and financial or interpersonal difficulties arising from the pandemic. Social distancing measures may prevent typical coping mechanisms such as personal space or sharing problems with others. Controls for these hazards include managers checking on workers to ask how they are, facilitating worker interactions, and formal services for employee assistance, coaching, or occupational health.

=== Medium-risk workplaces ===
According to OSHA, medium exposure risk jobs include those that require frequent or close contact within six feet (1.8 m) of people who are not known or suspected COVID-19 patients, but may be infected with SARS-CoV-2 due to ongoing community transmission around the business location, or because the individual has recent international travel to a location with widespread COVID-19 transmission. These include workers who have contact with the general public such as in schools, high-population-density work environments, and some high-volume retail settings.

Engineering controls for this and higher risk groups include installing high-efficiency air filters, increasing ventilation rates, installing physical barriers such as clear plastic sneeze guards, and installing a drive-through window for customer service.

Administrative controls for this and higher risk groups include encouraging sick workers to stay at home, replacing face-to-face meetings with virtual communications, establishing staggered shifts, discontinuing nonessential travel to locations with ongoing COVID-19 outbreaks, developing emergency communications plans including a forum for answering workers' concerns, providing workers with up-to-date education and training on COVID-19 risk factors and protective behaviors, training workers who need to use protecting clothing and equipment how to use it, providing resources and a work environment that promotes personal hygiene, requiring regular hand washing, limiting customers' and the public's access to the worksite, and posting signage about hand washing and other COVID-19 protective measures.

Depending on the work task, workers with at least medium exposure risk may need to wear personal protective equipment including some combination of gloves, a gown, a face shield or face mask, or goggles. Workers in this risk group rarely require use of respirators.

For retail workers in food and grocery businesses, CDC and OSHA recommend encouraging touchless payment options and minimizing handling of cash and credit cards, placing cash on the counter rather than passing it directly by hand, and routinely disinfecting frequently touched surfaces such as workstations, cash registers, payment terminals, door handles, tables, and countertops. Employers may place sneeze guards with a pass-through opening at the bottom of the barrier in checkout and customer service locations, use every other check-out lane, move the electronic payment terminal farther from the cashier, place visual cues such as floor decals to indicate where customers should stand during check out, provide remote shopping alternatives, and limit the maximum customer capacity at the door.

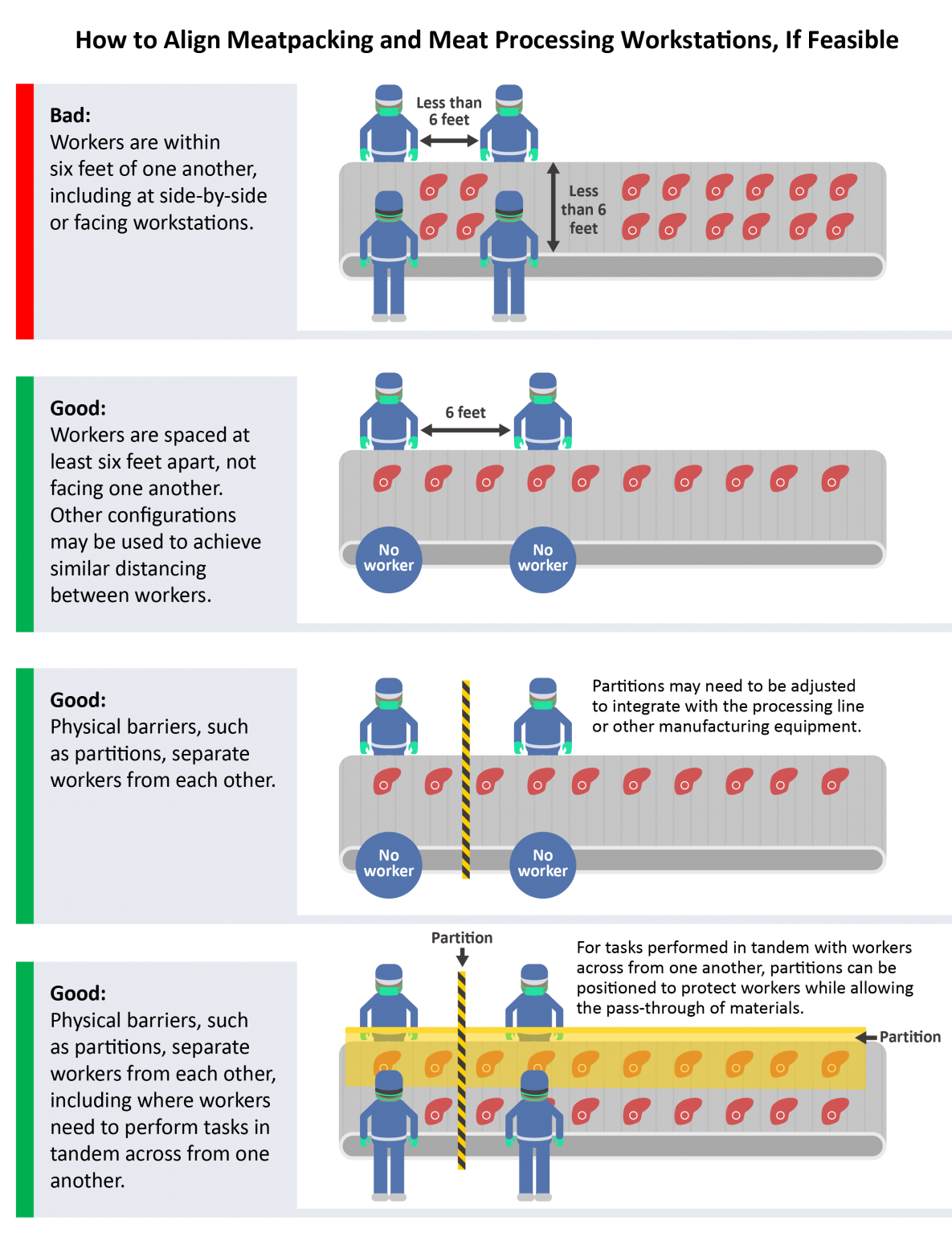
An infographic on ways to control COVID-19 hazards in meat processing facilities

Meat and poultry processing facilities have work environments that may contribute substantially to their potential exposures, as they often work close to one another on assembly lines during prolonged work shifts. For engineering controls, CDC and OSHA recommend configuring communal work environments so that workers are spaced at least six feet apart including along processing lines, using physical barriers such as strip curtains or plexiglass to separate workers from each other, and ensuring adequate ventilation that minimizes air from fans blowing from one worker directly at another worker. For administrative controls, they recommend staggering workers' arrival, break, and departure times, cohorting workers so they are always assigned to the same shifts with the same coworkers, encouraging single-file movement through the facility, avoiding carpooling to and from work, and considering a program of screening workers before entry into the workplace and setting criteria for return to work of recovered workers and for exclusion of sick workers. For personal protective equipment, they recommend face shields and considering allowing voluntary use of filtering facepiece respirators such as N95 masks. They also recommend wearing cloth face masks that should be replaced if they become wet, soiled, or otherwise visibly contaminated during the work shift, although cloth face masks are not considered to be personal protective equipment.

If a person becomes sick on an airplane, proper controls to protect workers and other passengers include separating the sick person from others by a distance of 6 feet, designating one crew member to serve the sick person, and offering a face mask to the sick person or asking the sick person to cover their mouth and nose with tissues when coughing or sneezing. Cabin crew should wear disposable medical gloves when tending to a sick traveler or touching body fluids or potentially contaminated surfaces, and possibly additional personal protective equipment if the sick traveler has fever, persistent cough, or difficulty breathing. Gloves and other disposable items should be disposed of in a biohazard bag, and contaminated surfaces should be cleaned and disinfected afterwards.

For commercial shipping, including cruise ships and other passenger vessels, hazard controls include postponing travel when sick, and self-isolating and informing the onboard medical center immediately if one develops a fever or other symptoms while on board. Ideally, medical follow-up should occur in the isolated person's cabin.

For schools and childcare facilities, CDC recommends short-term closure to clean or disinfect if an infected person has been in a school building regardless of community spread. When there is minimal to moderate community transmission, social distancing strategies can be implemented such as canceling field trips, assemblies, and other large gatherings such as physical education or choir classes or meals in a cafeteria, increasing the space between desks, staggering arrival and dismissal times, limiting nonessential visitors, and using a separate health office location for children with flu-like symptoms. When there is substantial transmission in the local community, in addition to social distancing strategies, extended school dismissals may be considered.

For law enforcement personnel performing daily routine activities, the immediate health risk is considered low by CDC. Law enforcement officials who must make contact with individuals confirmed or suspected to have COVID-19 are recommended to follow the same guidelines as emergency medical technicians, including proper personal protective equipment. If close contact occurs during apprehension, workers should clean and disinfect their duty belt and gear prior to reuse using a household cleaning spray or wipe, and follow standard operating procedures for the containment and disposal of used PPE and for containing and laundering clothes.

=== High-risk healthcare and mortuary workplaces ===
An infographic on the difference between surgical masks and N95 respirators

OSHA considers certain healthcare and mortuary workers to be at high or very high categories of exposure risk. High exposure risk jobs include healthcare delivery, support, laboratory, and medical transport workers who are exposed to known or suspected COVID-19 patients. These become very high exposure risk if workers perform aerosol-generating procedures on, or collect or handle specimens from, known or suspected COVID-19 patients. Aerosol-generating procedures include intubation, cough induction procedures, bronchoscopies, some dental procedures and exams, or invasive specimen collection. High exposure risk mortuary jobs include workers involved in preparing the bodies of people who had known or suspected cases of COVID-19 at the time of their death; these become very high exposure risk if they perform an autopsy.

Additional engineering controls for these risk groups include isolation rooms for patients with known or suspected COVID-19, including when aerosol-generating procedures are performed. Specialized negative pressure ventilation may be appropriate in some healthcare and mortuary settings. Specimens should be handled with Biosafety level 3 precautions. The World Health Organization (WHO) recommends that incoming patients be separated into distinct waiting areas depending on whether they are a suspected COVID-19 case.

In addition to other PPE, OSHA recommends respirators for those who work within 6 feet of patients known to be, or suspected of being, infected with SARS-CoV-2, and those performing aerosol-generating procedures. In the United States, NIOSH-approved N95 filtering facepiece respirators or better must be used in the context of a comprehensive, written respiratory protection program that includes fit-testing, training, and medical exams. Other types of respirators can provide greater protection and improve worker comfort.

The WHO does not recommend coveralls, as COVID-19 is a respiratory disease rather than being transmitted through bodily fluids. WHO recommends only a surgical mask for point-of-entry screening personnel. For those who are collecting respiratory specimens from, caring for, or transporting COVID-19 patients without any aerosol-generating procedures, WHO recommends a surgical mask, goggles, or face shield, gown, and gloves. If an aerosol-generating procedure is performed, the surgical mask is replaced with an N95 or FFP2 respirator.

== Guidance after the availability of COVID-19 vaccines ==
=== Noncompliance with guidelines ===
Guidelines, including masking, published after the 2002-2004 SARS outbreak

By 2023, The New York Times noted that the CDC had dropped mandates for masks in hospitals during COVID, limiting the COVID policies to an advisory role. Use of masks for source control is still recommended in times of high viral activity, but the CDC did not provide numbers for benchmarks. The new policies are thought, according to The New York Times, based on various citations to medical literature, to increase mortality among vulnerable patients, especially those with cancer.

The New York Times article cites a paper published in 2023, that suggests the high mortality of cancer patients following the Omicron wave may have been due to relaxing of policies preventing COVID-19 transmission (like source control policies). The 2023 paper also cites a research letter published in 2022, that suggests that the surge of COVID-19 cases in hospitals may have been due to the high contagiousness of Omicron, an article which suggested a high secondary attack rate relative to Delta, and papers finding increased mortality of cancer patients due to higher rates of breakthrough infections.

This runs counter to guidelines published in the wake of the 2002–2004 SARS outbreak.

In 2007, the CDC HICPAC published a set of guidelines, called the 2007 Guideline for Isolation Precautions: Preventing Transmission of Infectious Agents in Healthcare Settings, suggesting that use of "barrier precautions", defined as "masks, gowns, [and] gloves", would not be required, so long as it was limited to "routine entry", patients were not confirmed to be infected, and no aerosol-generating procedures were being done. "Standard precautions" requiring the use of masks, face shields, and/or eye protection, would be needed if there was potential for the spraying of bodily fluids, like during intubation.

The guidelines are the same regardless of the type of pathogen, but the guidelines also note that, based on the experience of SARS-CoV in Toronto, that "N95 or higher respirators may offer additional protection to those exposed to aerosol-generating procedures and high risk activities".

Separate from "barrier precautions" and "standard precautions" are "airborne precautions", a protocol for "infectious agents transmitted by the airborne route", like with SARS-CoV and tuberculosis, requiring 12 air changes per hour for new facilities, and use of fitted N95 respirators. These measures are used whenever someone is suspected of harboring an "infectious agent".

=== General workplace guidelines ===
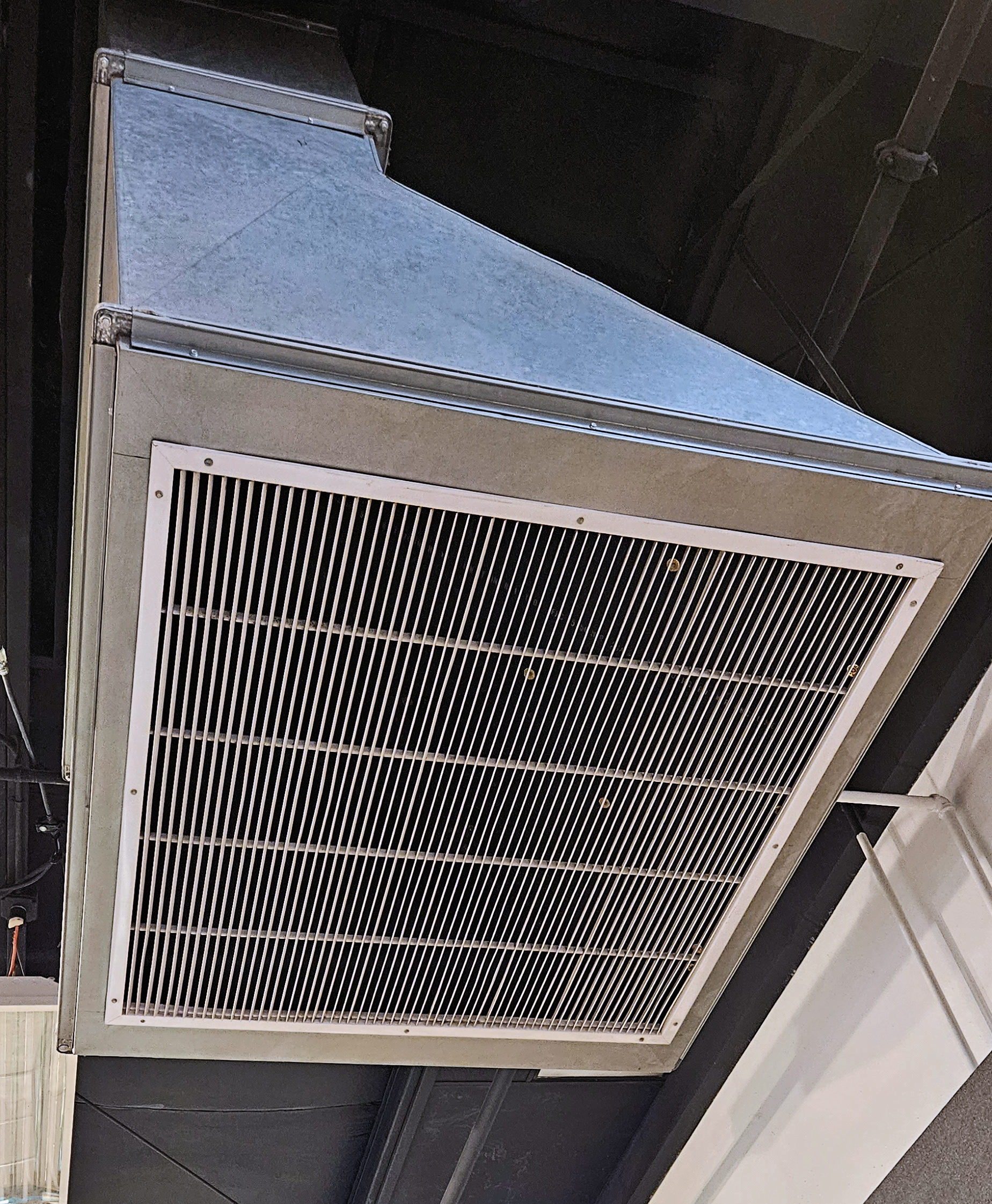
HVAC air changes per hour should be measured to at least 5 for the general public, and 12 in hospitals to comply with CDC guidelines

The CDC suggests that, in non-healthcare settings, building ventilation should be brought up to 5 air changes per hour, along with the use of MERV-13 filters, the use of air purifiers (air cleaners), and upper-room Ultraviolet germicidal irradiation (UVGI) to reduce the odds of infection and people coming down with COVID-19. The UVGI systems are said to be similar to the UVGI systems used against tuberculosis in the past in healthcare facilities. As for ventilation, a survey conducted under 1989 ASHRAE standards showed that, of the buildings constructed in prior years and surveyed, all but one did not meet the recommended 5 ACH.

Corsi–Rosenthal Boxes have been suggested as a viable temporary air cleaner. When tested by NIOSH, the boxes were found to reduce aerosols up to 73%, but most did not operate below noise standards.

== Proposed controls ==
These fixtures have been suggested as forms of "engineering controls" in the Hierarchy of hazard controls:

- Instead of the use of UVGI, use of far-UVC lighting to inactivate the virus causing COVID-19.
- Use of ceiling fans to aid in the removal of viral aerosols in the air, and support other engineering control measures, particularly ventilation. One paper found that by using ceiling fans to mix the air, the particles involved in short-range transmission could drop significantly, at the cost of a small increase in the amount of particles involved in long-range transmission. However, for ceiling fans to be effective, the authors noted that occupancy in a given ventilated room should generally stay within ASHRAE 241 recommendations, at around 36-154 m^{3} ventilated air/hr/person.

== See also ==
- Biological hazard
- Hierarchy of hazard controls
- Non-pharmaceutical intervention (epidemiology)
- Pandemic
