= Source control (respiratory disease) =

Strategy for reducing disease transmission

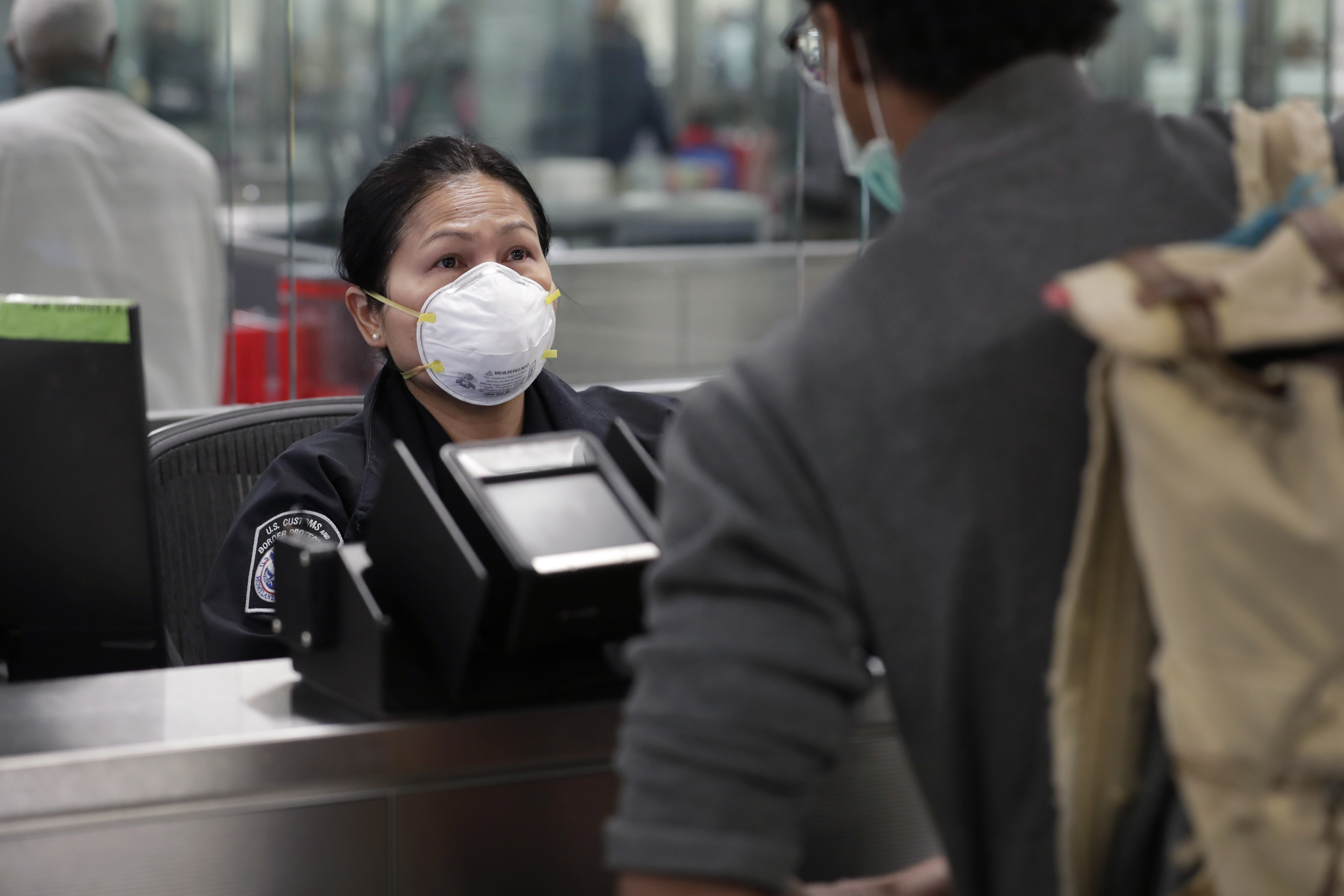
Certified respirators, without exhalation valves, are the recommended form of source control.

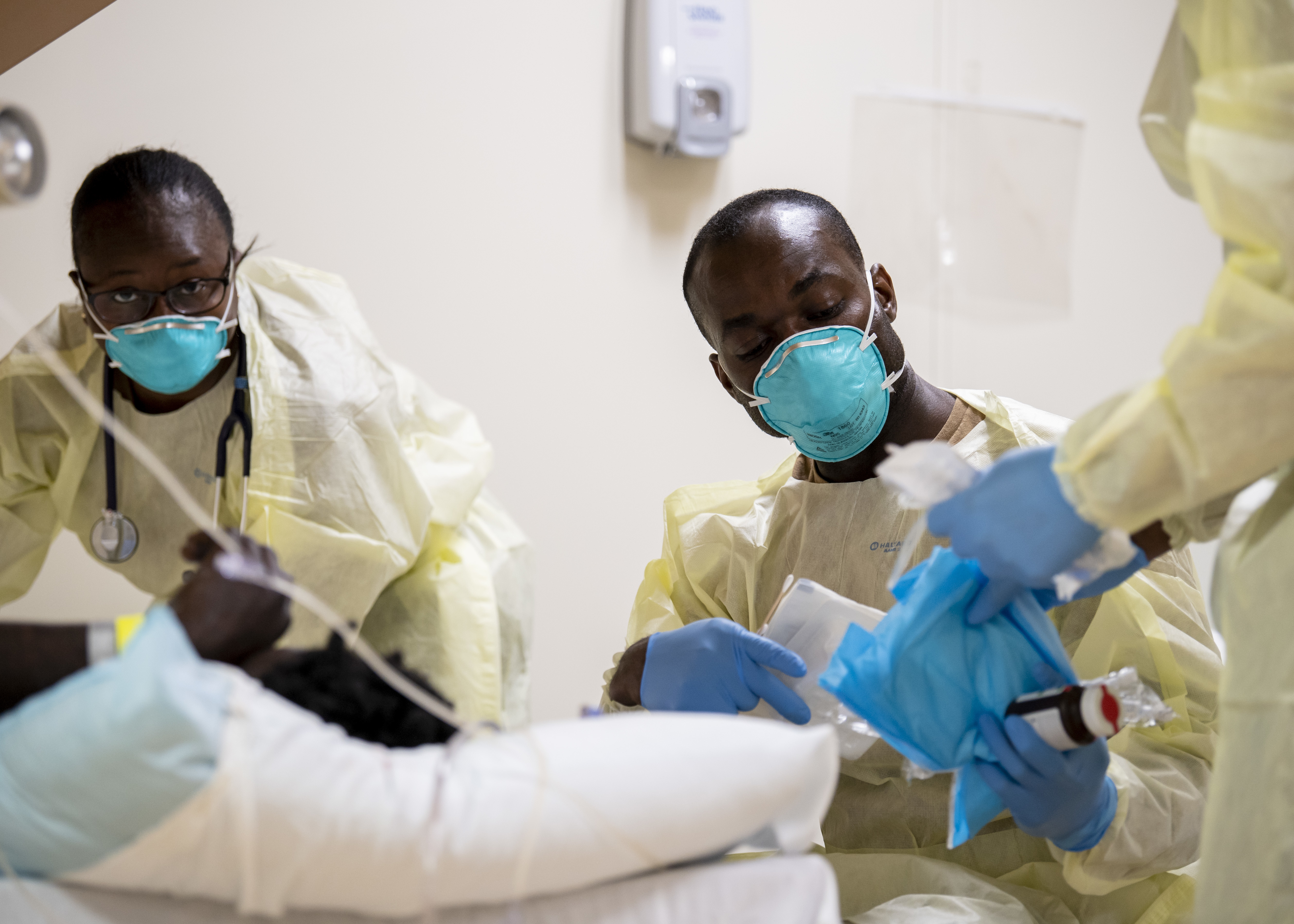
In hospitals, proper source control protocols are essential.

Source control is a strategy for reducing disease transmission by blocking respiratory secretions produced through breathing, speaking, coughing, sneezing or singing. Multiple source control techniques can be used in hospitals, but for the general public wearing personal protective equipment during epidemics or pandemics, respirators provide the greatest source control, followed by surgical masks, with cloth face masks recommended for use by the public only when there are shortages of both respirators and surgical masks.

== Mechanisms ==
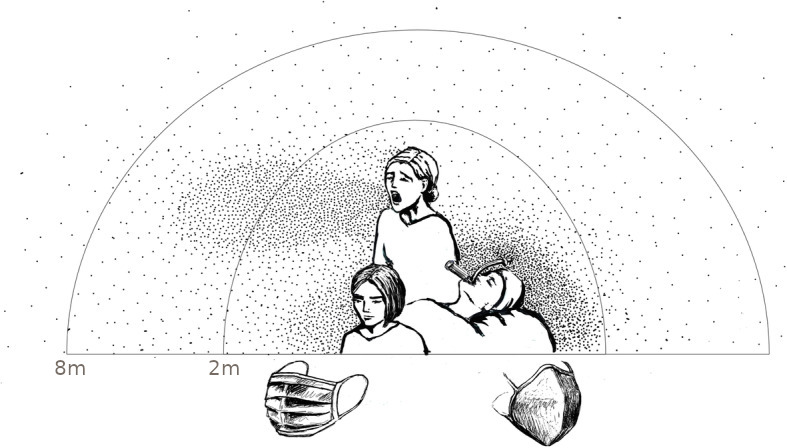
Droplet spread without source control: up to ~8 meters (26 ft) for sneezes and coughs, up to ~2 meters (6.6 ft) for talking. Aerosol spread is much further than this.

Infections in general may spread by direct contact (for example, shaking hands or kissing), by inhaling infectious droplets in the air (droplet transmission), by inhaling long-lasting aerosols with tiny particles (airborne transmission), and by touching objects with infectious material on their surfaces (fomites). Different diseases spread in different ways; some spread by only some of these routes. For instance, fomite transmission of COVID-19 is thought to be rare while aerosol, droplet and contact transmission appear to be the primary transmission modes, as of April 2021.

Coughs and sneezes can spread airborne droplets up to ~8 meters (26 ft). Speaking can spread droplets up to ~2 meters (6.6 ft).

Masking any person who may be a source of infectious droplets (or aerosols) thus reduces the unsafe range of physical distances. If a person can be infectious before they are symptomatic and diagnosed, then people who do not yet know if they are infectious may also be a source of infection.

For pathogens transmitted through the air, strategies to block cough air jets and to capture aerosols, e.g. the "Shield & Sink" approach, can be highly effective in minimizing exposure to respiratory secretions.

Outside of respiratory source control, handwashing helps to protect people against contact transmission, and against indirect droplet transmission. Handwashing removes infectious droplets that their mask caught (from either side) and which transferred to their hands when they touched their mask.

=== Potentially ineffective methods of source control ===
In the past, suggestions have been made that covering the mouth and nose, like with an elbow, tissue, or hand, would be a viable measure towards reducing the transmissions of airborne diseases. This method of source control was suggested, but not empirically tested, in the "Control of Airborne Infection" section of a 1974 publication of Riley's Airborne Infection. NIOSH also noted that the use of a tissue as source control, in their guidelines for TB, had not been tested as of 1992.

In 2013, Gustavo et al. looked into the effectiveness of various methods of source control, including via the arm, via a tissue, via bare hands, and via a surgical mask. They concluded that simply covering a cough was not an effective method of stopping transmission, and a surgical mask was not effective at reducing the amount of displaced droplets detected compared to the other rudimentary forms of source control. Another paper noted that the fit of a face mask matters in its source control performance. (However, note that OSHA 29 CFR 1910.134 does not cover the fit of face masks other than NIOSH-approved respirators.)

== Contrast with personal protective equipment ==
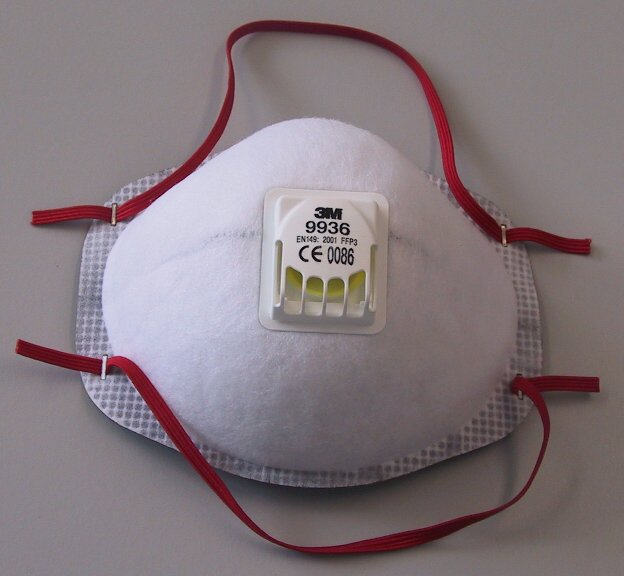
Masks with exhalation valves are not very effective for source control. However, some respirators with exhalation valves performed as well as a surgical mask in source control. Respirators without exhalation valves should be preferred.

While source control protects others from transmission arising from the wearer, personal protective equipment protects the wearer themselves. Cloth face masks can be used for source control (as a last resort) but are not considered personal protective equipment as they have low filter efficiency (generally varying between 2–60%), although they are easy to obtain and reusable after washing. There are no standards or regulation for self-made cloth face masks, and source control on a well-fitted cloth mask is worse than a surgical mask.

Surgical masks are designed to protect against splashes and sprays, but do not provide complete respiratory protection from germs and other contaminants because of the loose fit between the surface of the face mask and the face. Surgical masks are regulated by various national standards to have high bacterial filtration efficiency (BFE). N95/N99/N100 masks and other filtering facepiece respirators can provide source control in addition to respiratory protection, but respirators with an unfiltered exhalation valve may not provide source control and require additional measures to filter exhalation air when source control is required.

=== Exhalation source control with respirators ===
Video by NIOSH detailing the use of various types of respirators for the prevention of TB (Script on Wikisource)

Some masks have exhalation valve that let the exhaled air go out unfiltered. The certification grade of the mask (such as N95) is about the mask itself and it does not warrant any safety about the air that is expelled by the wearer through the valve. A mask with valve mainly increases the comfort of the wearer.

Unfiltered exhalation of air is found on both filtering facepiece and elastomeric respirators with exhalation valves. Unfiltered air is also found on powered air-purifying respirators, which cannot ever filter exhaled air. During the COVID-19 pandemic, masks with unfiltered-exhalation valves ran counter to the requirements of some mandatory mask orders. Despite the aforementioned belief, a 2020 research by the NIOSH and CDC shows that an uncovered exhalation valve already provides source control on a level similar to, or even better than, surgical masks.

It is possible to seal some unfiltered exhalation valves or to cover it with an additional surgical mask; this might be done where mask shortages make it necessary. However, so long as there are no shortages, respirators without exhalation valves should still be preferred in situations where source control is necessary.

Comparison of face masks by function
Type	Source control	Inhaled air filtration	Ref
Cloth face mask	Worse than surgical	Bad	
Surgical mask or procedure mask	Avoid if possible	Bad	
Respirator without exhalation valve	Good	Good	
Respirator with unfiltered exhalation valve	Depends on respirator	Good	
Respirator with filtered exhalation valve	Good	Good	

== Source Control during TB Outbreaks ==
=== US HIV/AIDS epidemic ===
1997 proposed OSHA administrative rule: No Admittance Without Wearing a Type N95 or More Protective Respirator

Similar to NIOSH's Hierarchy of Hazard Controls, multiple controls are used for source control of TB

NIOSH guidelines for TB, with focus on respirators under the old 30 CFR 11, replaced in 1995 (On Wikisource)

HIV was a noted co-infection in around 35% of those affected by TB in some regions of the US, despite extended close contact being a requisite factor for infection. Respirable particles are noted to be created by handling TB-infected tissue, or by coughing by those actively infected. Once in the air, droplet nuclei can persist in unventilated spaces. Most people infected with TB are asymptomatic, unless the immune system is weakened by some other factor, like HIV/AIDS, which can turn an infected person's latent TB into active TB source.

1994 CDC guidelines brought three methods of source control for the prevention of TB: administrative controls, engineering controls, and personal protective equipment, particularly with the use of fit-checked respirators.

Administrative controls mainly involve people and areas in hospital responsible for TB controls, including training, skin-testing, and regulatory compliance, as well as those responsible for quantifying the amount of TB present in the hospital's community and in-hospital, like staff. To assist with this, OSHA proposed TB guidelines in 1997, but withdrew them in 2003 following the decline of TB.

Engineering controls mainly involve ventilation and planning isolation rooms, but can also involve environmental controls, like negative pressure, ultraviolet germicidal radiation, and the use of HEPA filters.

The use of personal protective equipment, in this system of TB controls, requires the use of respirators whenever personnel are in contact with someone suspected of having TB, including during transport. This includes anyone near the infected person, all of whom must be provided with some sort of personal protective equipment, to avoid contracting TB. If PPE cannot be provided in time, the infected patient should be delayed from being moved through an area not controlled by PPE until the controls are in place, unless the care of the infected patient is compromised by an administrative delay.

During TB outbreaks in the 1990s, multiple hospitals upgraded their controls and policies to attenuate the spread of TB.

== COVID-19 pandemic ==
=== United States ===
HICPAC 2007 Guideline for Isolation Precautions. A more general guideline for hospital PPE procedures. (PDF, 225 pages)

==== Pre-COVID ====
In 2007, the CDC HICPAC published a set of guidelines, called the 2007 Guideline for Isolation Precautions: Preventing Transmission of Infectious Agents in Healthcare Settings, suggesting that use of "barrier precautions", defined as "masks, gowns, [and] gloves", would not be required, so long as it was limited to "routine entry", patients were not confirmed to be infected, and no aerosol-generating procedures were being done. "Standard precautions" requiring the use of masks, face shields, and/or eye protection, would be needed if there was potential for the spraying of bodily fluids, like during intubation.

The guidelines are the same regardless of the type of pathogen, but the guidelines also note that, based on the experience of SARS-CoV in Toronto, that "N95 or higher respirators may offer additional protection to those exposed to aerosol-generating procedures and high risk activities".

Separate from "barrier precautions" and "standard precautions" are "airborne precautions", a protocol for "infectious agents transmitted by the airborne route", like with SARS-CoV and tuberculosis, requiring 12 air changes per hour for new facilities, and use of fitted N95 respirators. These measures are used whenever someone is suspected of harboring an "infectious agent".

==== Early measures ====
During the COVID-19 pandemic, cloth face masks for source control had been recommended by the U.S. Centers for Disease Control and Prevention (CDC) for members of the public who left their homes, and health care facilities were recommended to consider requiring face masks for all people who enter a facility. Health care personnel and patients with COVID-19 symptoms were recommended to use surgical masks if available, as they are more protective. Masking patients reduces the personal protective equipment recommended by CDC for health care personnel under crisis shortage conditions.

==== Post-2023 ====
By 2023, The New York Times noted that the CDC had dropped mandates for masks in hospitals during COVID, limiting the COVID policies to an advisory role. Use of masks for source control is still recommended in times of high viral activity, but the CDC did not provide numbers for benchmarks. The new policies are thought, according to The New York Times, based on various citations to medical literature, to increase mortality among vulnerable patients, especially those with cancer.

The New York Times article cites a paper published in 2023, that suggests the high mortality of cancer patients following the Omicron wave may have been due to relaxing of policies preventing COVID-19 transmission (like source control policies). The 2023 paper also cites a research letter published in 2022, that suggests that the surge of COVID-19 cases in hospitals may have been due to the high contagiousness of Omicron, an article which suggested a high secondary attack rate relative to Delta, and papers finding increased mortality of cancer patients due to higher rates of breakthrough infections.

Also in 2023, new draft guidelines were proposed by the CDC HICPAC, to update the pre-COVID 2007 Guideline for Isolation Precautions: Preventing Transmission of Infectious Agents in Healthcare Settings. (Note: See Source control (respiratory disease)#Pre-COVID) The proposed updates were met with disapproval by the National Nurses United union, as they felt the changes did not go far enough. Changes included clarifying by adding "source control" as a qualification for the use of "barrier precautions".

=== United Kingdom ===
A paper in the Journal of Hospital Infection, published in 2024, focusing on hospitals in the UK, found that the removal of mandates, based around surgical masks, in hospitals was not associated with an increase in SARS-CoV-2 infections from weeks between December 4, 2021, to December 10, 2022. However, the authors noted that the end of mask mandates also coincided with an increase in Omicron infections, and that more data would be needed despite evidence for removal of mask mandates from 2022 to 2023.

== See also ==
- Face masks during the COVID-19 pandemic
- N95 respirator
- Respirator assigned protection factors
  - Permissible exposure limit
- Workplace hazard controls for COVID-19
