= Source control (disambiguation) =

Source control may refer to:

- Version control in computing
- Source control (respiratory disease), techniques to reduce spread of respiratory diseases such as COVID-19
- A treatment for sepsis involving physical intervention at the source of an infection
- Source control action, a procedure used for Superfund sites
