= Sneeze guard =

Transparent screen designed to protect people or food from respiratory droplets

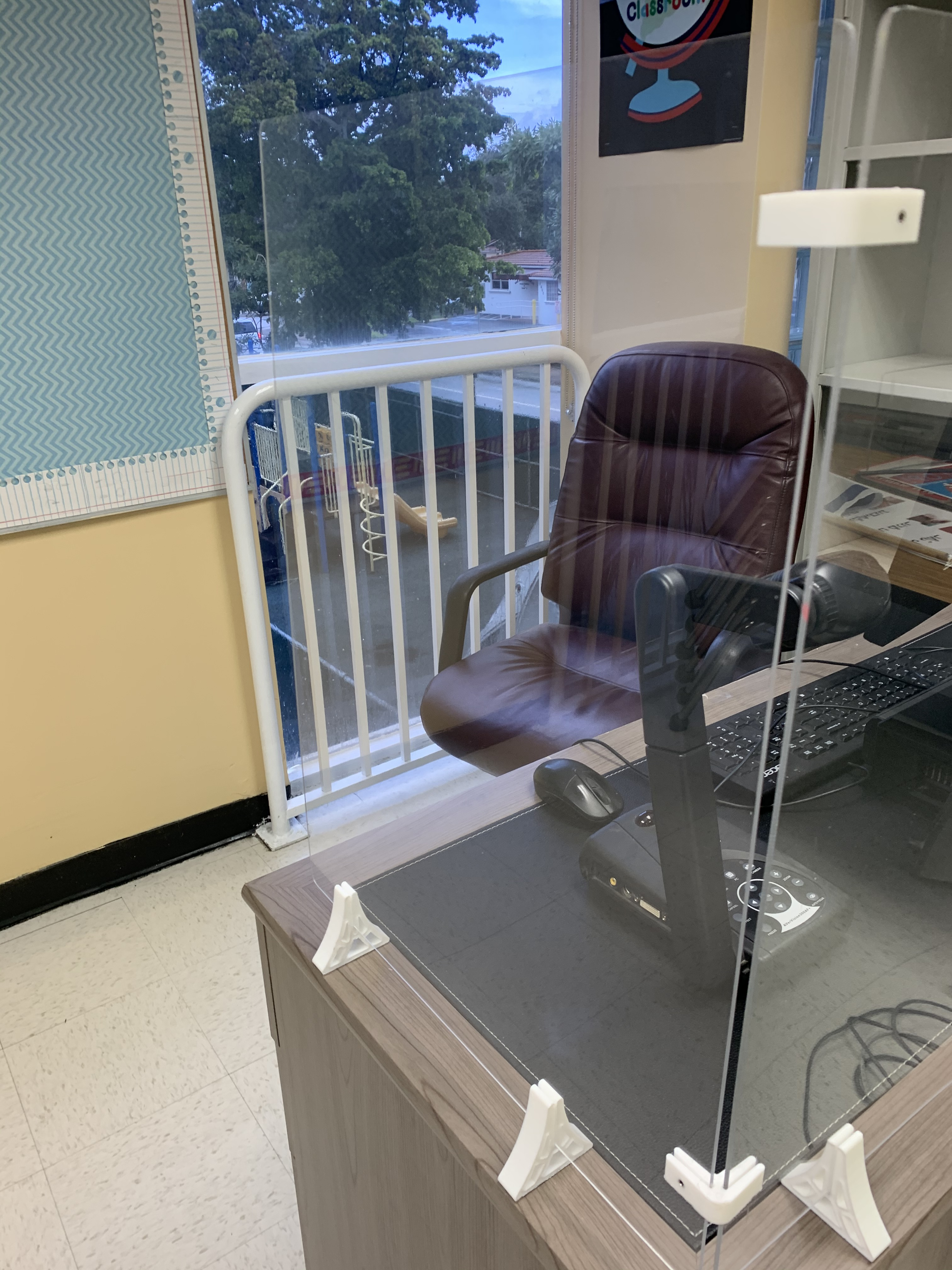
Sneeze guard with mounting system

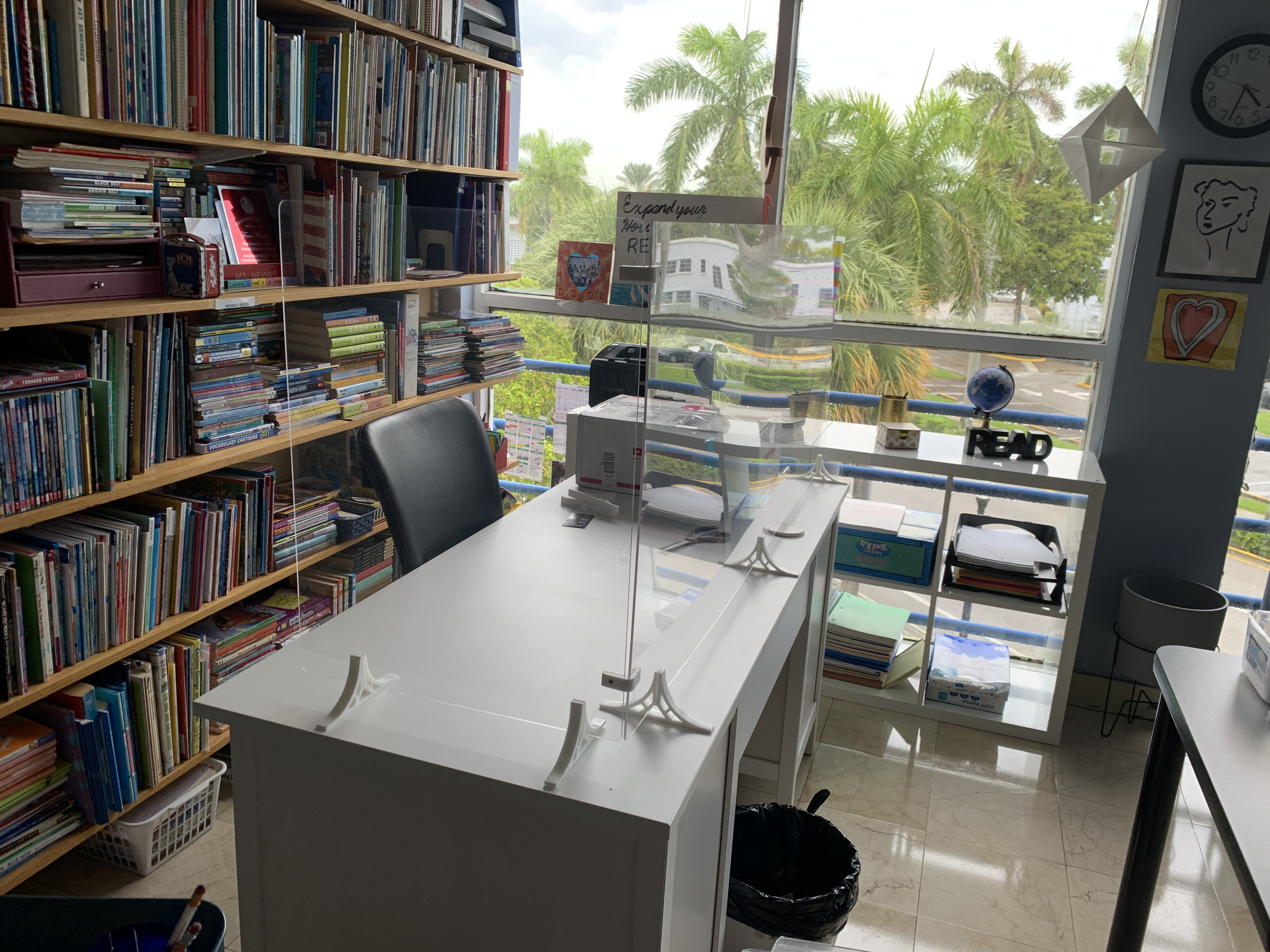
Sneeze guard installed on a teacher's desk

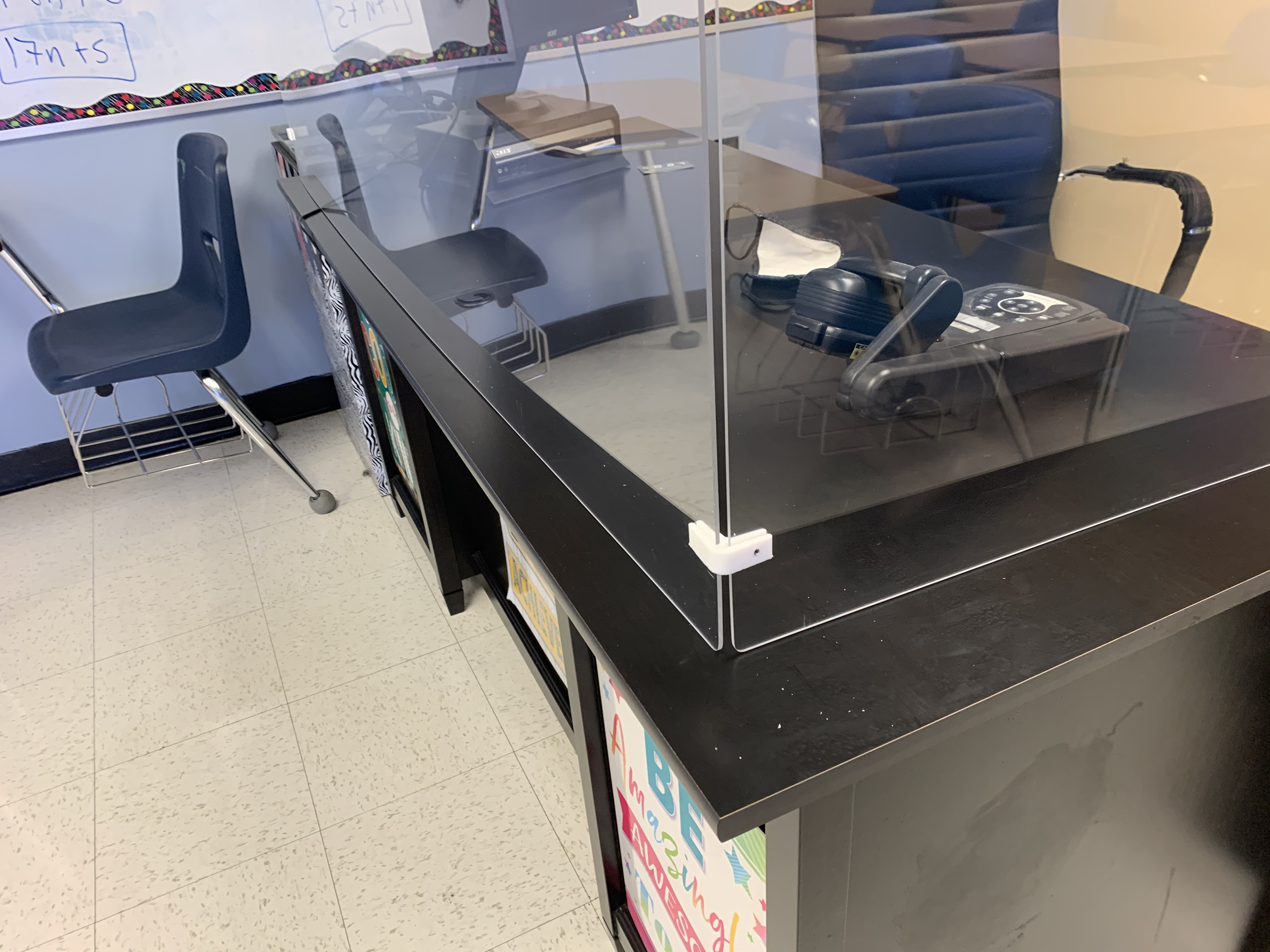
Sneeze guard on a teacher's desk

A sneeze guard, sneezeguard, or cough shield is an acrylic or glass screen designed to protect food or people from the exposure to respiratory droplets, which are dispensed when coughing, sneezing, or speaking. Sneeze guards have been in use in restaurants for decades. With the rise of the COVID-19 pandemic, sneeze guards have been installed in public places like offices, schools and retail stores to reduce the risk of infection through respiratory droplets.

In February 2020, the World Health Organization advised the use of "physical barriers to reduce exposure to the COVID-19 virus, such as glass or plastic windows", which is in line with the advice of the Centers for Disease Control and Prevention, which recommends to "Place a barrier (e.g. sneeze guard) between employees and customers".

== Styles of sneeze guards ==
Freestanding sneeze guards: These types of sneeze guards are made up of a clear plastic or tempered glass panel with a system designed to hold it up. They may be used on reception desks, conference tables, serving tables, etc. A freestanding sneeze guard can be used anywhere on a flat surface. Most are used on desks or raised surfaces. Some go from the floor to above the head and act as a clear wall. Others are designed to partition space from a seated level, like separating tables at a restaurant.

Cubicle sneeze guards: These types of sneeze guards are made of a clear plastic panel with a system designed to mount the panel onto a cubicle partition. This type has risen in popularity as many businesses look to reopen safely post COVID-19 outbreak. Many companies have come out with differing versions of cubicle sneeze guards.

Hanging sneeze guards: These types of sneeze guards are made up of a clear plastic panel hung from the ceiling at a desired height. This sort of sneeze guard can be customized to fit almost any purpose. These allow the end customer to decide where to protect. It also allows for a larger area of protection. These also tend to be the cheapest sneeze guards on the market.

Portable sneeze guards: These are the newest type of sneeze guards made available to the market in direct response to combat the COVID-19 pandemic. It improves upon the traditional sneeze guard by its collapsible design enabling its transformation into an easy-to-carry form. This sort of sneeze guard conveniently transports inside a backpack, briefcase, or similar everyday carry bag. Extending the benefits of regular sneeze guards, portable sneeze guards can be used in schools, campuses, restaurants and cafes, workplaces, or practically anywhere. They provide a highly mobile barrier from respiratory droplets. A portable sneeze guard fills a PPE-gap, further protecting children and adults from airborne infectious disease spread from sneezing, coughing, talking, laughing, or eating.

== Types of plastic ==
Sneeze guards are advertised under many different materials. Most companies sell sneeze guards made of clear acrylic plastic. Acrylic is more well known under its commercial name Plexiglas, and is made of Poly(methyl methacrylate). This material is sold under a variety of names. Other commonly used materials are Polycarbonate, a more flexible less flammable plastic, and PETG. With growing concerns over sneeze guard use, the New York State Education Department released a memo claiming that certain barriers must be polycarbonate due to the fire code. A line in the memo reads, "Note for installations where the sneeze guard is not fastened to a building element, the product would be considered a furnishing required to comply with MPS S205-13 b. Fire test criteria is required to be approved, "Items of obvious and questionable hazard avoided". Any sneeze guard in New York that does not require installation, i.e. portable sneeze guards, may be made from Plexiglas.

== Effectiveness ==
Multiple studies, including by Johns Hopkins University, the UK SAGE Environmental Modelling Group (EMG) for COVID-19, and the U.S. National Institute for Occupational Safety and Health (NIOSH) have shown that sneeze guards may not be necessarily effective against reducing the spread of respiratory diseases, finding that they can impede the ventilation of a room, and that the barriers were more effective at blocking particles exhaled by coughs than particles exhaled by speaking (which accumulate around the barrier as an aerosol), as they were generally larger and had more momentum. A controlled test in the NIOSH study found that taller barriers prevented about 70% of particles from a simulated cough from reaching the other side, as measured via particle counter.
