= Mining Enforcement and Safety Administration =

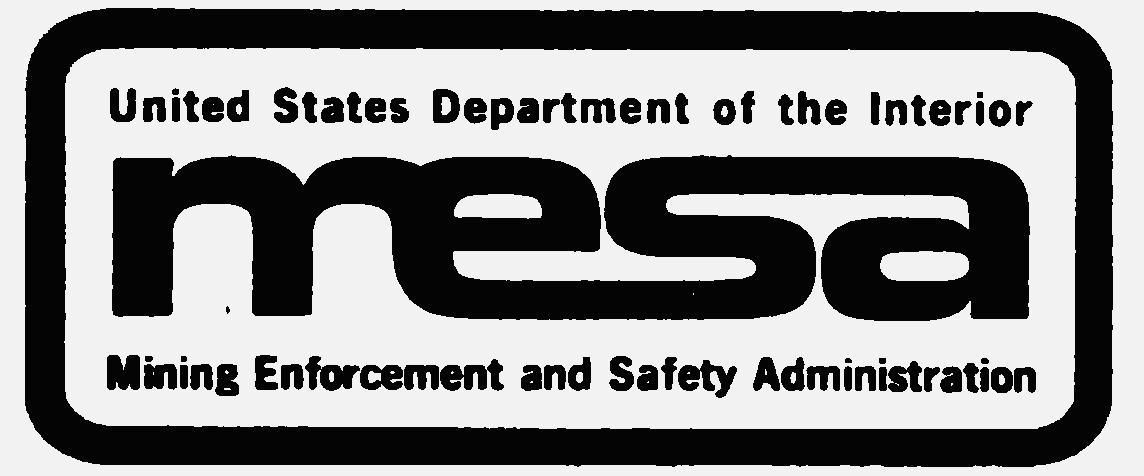

Agency overview
- Formed: 1969
- Preceding agency: United States Bureau of Mines
- Dissolved: 1978
- Superseding agency: Mine Safety and Health Administration

The Mining Enforcement and Safety Administration (MESA) under the U.S. Department of the Interior was the predecessor of the Mine Safety and Health Administration, prior to March 9, 1978. It was formed by the Federal Coal Mine Health and Safety Act of 1969, and co-approved respirators with NIOSH under 30 CFR Part 11. It was dissolved and replaced with MSHA following the passage of the Federal Mine Safety and Health Act of 1977.

== History ==
Through an administrative action in 1973, the United States Secretary of the Interior created the MESA as an agency within the Department of the Interior. Because of concern about the apparent conflict of interest between the health and safety enforcement functions of the United States Bureau of Mines (USBM) and its production-focused oversight of mineral resources, USBM's safety operations and health enforcement responsibilities were split off to MESA's charge until MSHA's establishment in 1978.

== See also ==
- Federal Mine Safety and Health Review Commission
- Mine Safety and Health Act of 1977
- Mine Safety and Health Administration (MSHA)
