= Secondary attack rate =

Model concept in transmission of infectious disease

In epidemiology, the secondary attack rate (SAR) is the proportion or probability of susceptible contacts who develop infection within a reasonable incubation period after known exposure to a primary (index) case (or patient zero, i.e. the case which introduced the pathogenic organism into the population) or the same infectious source. It is typically calculated in households, families, dormitories, barracks, or other closed groups (such as attending medical staff), where close contact facilitates person-to-person transmission.

== Calculation ==
Secondary Attack Rate (SAR) is expressed by the following formula:

$$SAR = \frac{A}{M} \times 100$$

where

- $A$ = Number of new cases among contacts of primary cases
- $M$ = Total number of susceptible contacts

The denominator may be restricted to susceptible persons when these can be determined (e.g., by excluding immune or already-infected individuals). In practice, it is often approximated as the total population in the household (or other group) minus the number of primary cases.

SAR can be estimated using many different epidemiologic study designs, models, and methods. While traditionally termed a "rate," SAR is not a true rate, but a proportion.

== Use ==
SAR is a key epidemiologic parameter used to assess contagiousness (person-to-person spread) of an infectious agent, differentiate transmission in households or closed settings from community transmission, evaluate control measures for limiting spread, and model transmission dynamics, accounting for correlation among contacts exposed to the same source.

== See also ==
- Attack rate, the proportion of an at-risk population that contracts the disease during a specified time interval.
