= The Straits Chinese Magazine =

English-language periodical in Singapore

- Editor: Lim Boon Keng; Song Ong Siang; Wu Lien-teh; Yin Suat Chuan
- First issue: March 1897
- Final issue: 1907
- Based in: Singapore
- Language: English

The Straits Chinese Magazine: A Quarterly Journal of Orential and Occidental Culture was a magazine published by Koh Yew Hean Press. Founded by prominent members of the Peranakan community of Singapore Lim Boon Keng and Song Ong Siang in 1897, it was the first English-language periodical to be owned, edited and published by Malayans.

== History ==
The magazine's first issue was published in March 1897 by Koh Yew Hean Press. It aimed to "promote intellectual activity amongst the Straits-born people, and to guide the present chaotic state of public opinion among them to some definite end". All 800 copies of the issue, which were priced at 50 cents each, were sold. An annual subscription to the magazine cost 1.50 Straits dollars. The main editors of the magazine were Lim Boon Keng and Song Ong Siang, who were both prominent members of the Straits Chinese community in Singapore. It was the first magazine to be entirely edited and published by Malayans. P. V. S. Locke assisted in editing the magazine's third volume, which was published in 1899. Wu Lien-teh joined as an editor in 1904 and Yin Suat Chuan joined as an editor in 1906. Tan Teck Soon, Henry Nicholas Ridley and Tan Keong Saik also contributed to the magazine as writers.

Articles in the magazine were mainly in English. However, classical Chinese texts were also occasionally included, and were accompanied by English translations. The magazine featured book reviews and letters from readers, as well as reports from international correspondents in later issues. Transcripts of talks delivered at local literary societies and associations were another common feature. The magazine frequently featured articles that were supportive of the reformist movement in China. Articles featuring Confucianist teachings were also frequently published in the magazine. The magazine was credited with reviving interest in Confucianism amongst the Chinese in Singapore and the Dutch East Indies.

The magazine was distributed in towns and cities across British Malaya, as well as in London, Edinburgh, Saigon, Yokohama, Bangkok and Batavia. However, by 1903, the magazine had begun to encounter financial difficulties. The magazine folded in December 1907, following the publication of the eleventh issue. Song attributed the magazine's folding to the lack of support and interest from the Straits Chinese community.

The magazine was revived by Song and Lim in January 1930 as the Straits Chinese Annual.
