= Non-surgical mask =

Non-surgical mask may refer to:

- Cloth face masks
  - other non-medical masks
- using a surgical mask for non-surgical reasons.
