= Zhang Xue (geneticist) =

Chinese geneticist

President of Harbin Medical University
- Incumbent
- Assumed office October 2018
- Preceded by: Yang Baofeng

Personal details
- Born: July 1964 (age 62) Zhaozhou County, Heilongjiang, China
- Party: Chinese Communist Party
- Education: China Medical University (PRC)
- Scientific career
- Fields: Molecular genetics
- Workplaces: Harbin Medical University

Chinese name
- Traditional Chinese: 張學
- Simplified Chinese: 张学
Transcriptions
Standard Mandarin
- Hanyu Pinyin: Zhāng Xué

Zhang Xue (Chinese: 张学; born July 1964) is a Chinese geneticist currently serving as president and Chinese Communist Party Deputy Committee Secretary of Harbin Medical University.

== Biography ==
Zhang was born in Zhaozhou County, Heilongjiang, in July 1964. He earned a bachelor's degree in clinical medicine in 1986, a master's degree in genetics in 1989, and a doctor's degree in cell biology in 1994, all from China Medical University (PRC). After graduation, he joined the faculty of the university. In 2018, he was appointed president of Harbin Medical University, replacing Yang Baofeng. Before the appointment, he worked at Peking Union Medical College.

== Honours and awards ==
- 1997 The 5th China Youth Science and Technology Award
- 2001 National Science Fund for Distinguished Young Scholars
- 2011 The 4th Tan Jiazhen Life Science Innovation Award
- 2014 State Natural Science Award (Second Class)
- November 22, 2019 Member of the Chinese Academy of Engineering (CAE)

Educational offices
Preceded by Yang Baofeng	President of Harbin Medical University; 2018	Incumbent
