= Robert Lim =

Chinese physician (1897–1969)

Robert Lim FRSE
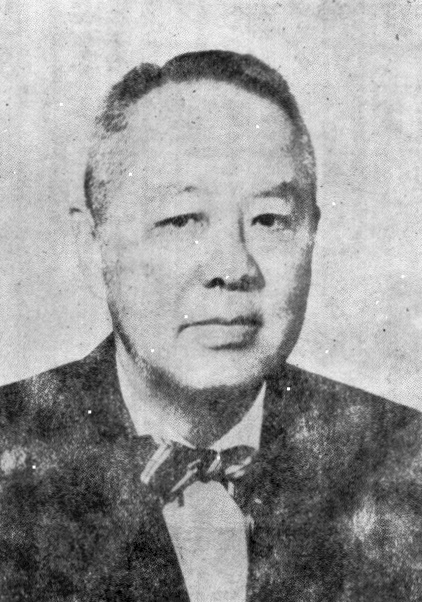
- Born: 15 October 1897; Singapore, Straits Settlements
- Died: 8 July 1969 (aged 71); Jamaica
- Education: University of Edinburgh
- Spouses: Margaret Torrance (m. 1920, died) Tsing Ying Tsang (m. 1946)
- Children: 2 (from Margaret)
- Scientific career
- Fields: Physiology
- Institutions: University of Edinburgh; University of Illinois at Chicago

Robert Kho-Seng Lim FRSE (Chinese: 林可勝; pinyin: Lín Kěshèng; 15 October 1897 – 8 July 1969), also known as Bobby Lin, was a Singaporean medical doctor.

== Life ==
Lim was born in Singapore in 1897. He was the son of Lim Boon Keng, who promoted social and educational reforms in Singapore and China.

The family moved to Edinburgh in Scotland when he was eight. He attended George Watson's College. During the World War I, he volunteered for and served in the Indian army medical service. In 1916, he returned to Edinburgh for medical studies, and graduated in 1919 with a MB ChB in medicine from the University of Edinburgh, where he subsequently earned a PhD in 1921, and a DSc in 1923. Aged 26, he was elected a Fellow of the Royal Society of Edinburgh, proposers were Sir Edward Albert Sharpey-Schafer, William White Taylor, Arthur Robertson Cushny, and George Barger.

Lim was awarded a Rockefeller fellowship in 1924, and used this to travel to the United States. He worked in the department of physiology in the University of Chicago before he was appointed associate professor, then head of department at the Peking Union Medical College. He was the founder of the Chinese Physiological Society.

In 1929, Lim became a trustee of the 'Nanyang Club' in Penang, appointed by Cheah Cheang Lim. Other trustees included Queen's scholars Dr Wu Lien-teh and Wu Lai Hsi, and Rockefeller Fellowship scholar and PUMC colleague, Dr Lim Chong Eang. The 'Nanyang Club' is an old house in Peiping, China and was used to provide convenient accommodation to overseas Chinese friends.

After the Second Sino-Japanese War, Lim rebuilt China's medical education and medical research. He was a lieutenant general in the Army and surgeon general of the Republic of China. In 1947, Lim reorganized the National Defense Medical Center and served as its first president. He left for the United States in 1949.

Lim was elected as a foreign member of United States National Academy of Sciences in 1942, and was elected a member in 1956. He was granted American citizenship in 1955.

== Personal life ==
Lim married Margaret Torrance in Scotland in 1920. Following Torrance's death, he married Helen Tsing-ying Tsang in Shanghai in 1946.

In 1967, Lim was diagnosed with esophageal cancer. In 1969, Lim moved to Jamaica where his son lived, to be with his family. Lim died on 8 July 1969.

== Bibliography ==
- Lim, Robert Kho Seng (1921). "Researches on the gastric glands". Biological Sciences thesis and dissertation collection.
