= Cheah Ghim Leng =

Member of the Perak State Council

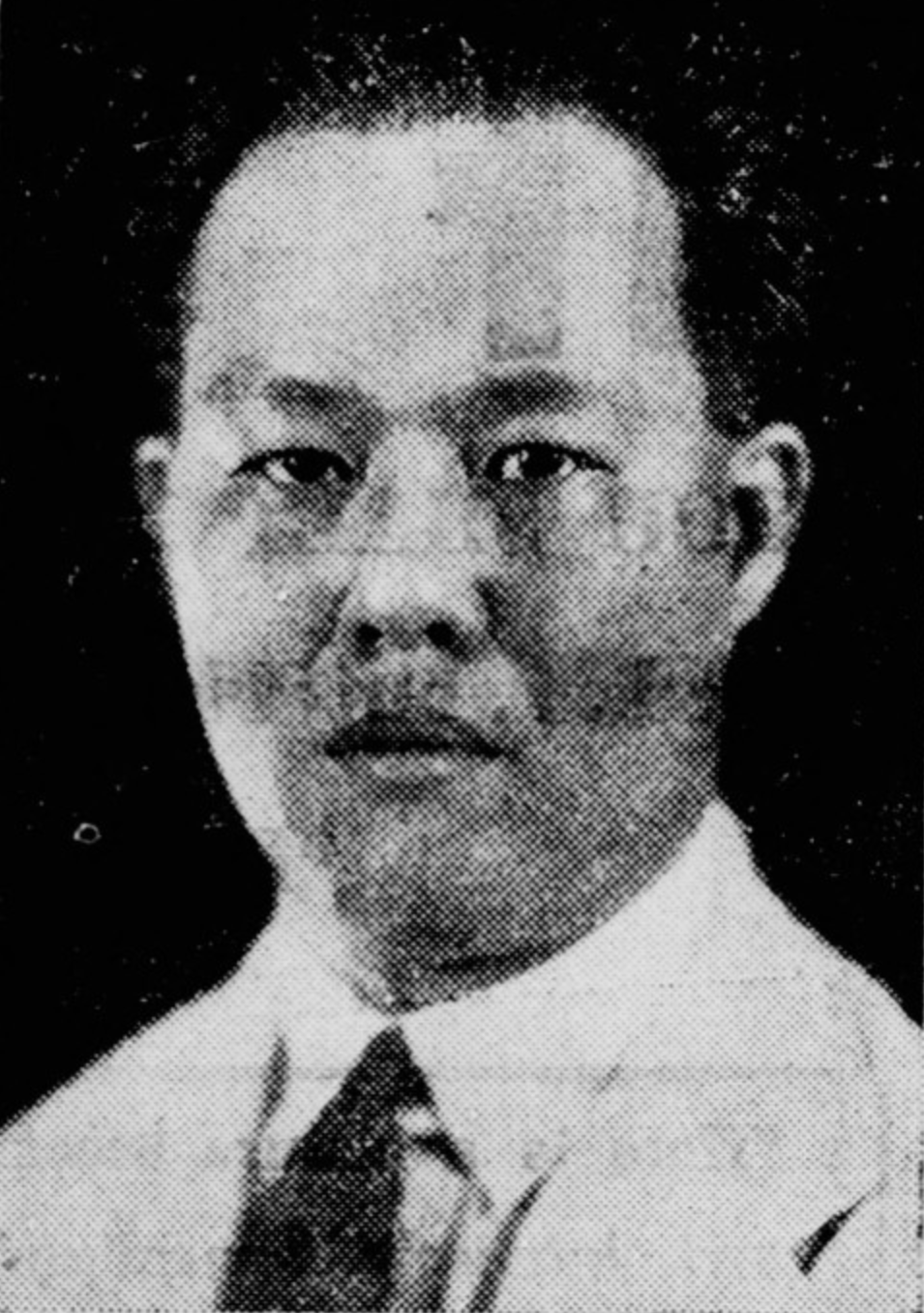
Cheah in 1935

Cheah Ghim Leng (1902 — ) was a member of the Perak State Council, a Justice of the Peace and a member of the Federal Council.

== Early life and education ==
Cheah was born in Penang in 1902. His father was Cheah Cheang Lim, a prominent businessman. He attended St. Xavier's Institution in Penang.

== Career ==
After serving as an apprentice at Brown Phillips and Stewart, Evatt and Co., Federal Rubber Stamp and Co, and Frankel Brothers, he went to Ipoh to assist his father in his tin and rubber companies.

He was a member of the Federal Council. He held offices in several minor clubs and associations in Ipoh. He also served as a visiting justice of prisons in Kinta, a member of the Chinese Decrepit Hospitals Board, a committee member of the Perak Chinese Maternity Association, a committee member of the Lung Thau Nam Decrepit Women Fund, a committee member of the Perak Po Leung Kuk, a committee member of the Discharged Prisoners' Aid Society a member of the Advisory committee on Chinese labour, a member of the general committee of the Perak Chinese section of the War Fund, a member of the Kinta Sanitary Board, a member of the Kew Sang section of the China Relief Fund committee and the vice chairman of the Chinese section of the Perak Patriotic Fund.

From 1931 to 1933, he served as the honorary general secretary of the Perak Mining and Planting Association. He later served as a committee member of the association. He was made a Justice of the Peace in May 1935, and was possibly the youngest Justice of the Peace in British Malaya. He was conferred the OBE in 1941 and appointed to the Perak State Council. He resigned from the governing council and as a member of the Perak Chinese Welfare Association in 1952.

== Personal life ==
Cheah was married. His wife gave birth to his daughter on 13 October 1937. He was hospitalised in August 1941.
