= Tan See Boo =

Chinese Christian missionary (1833–1884)

- Born: 18 June 1833; Xiamen, China
- Died: 25 November 1884 (aged 51); Singapore
- Occupation: Missionary
- Spouses: Yeo Geok Neo (m. 1858; died 1863); Ang Choo Neo (m. 1864)
- Children: Tan Teck Soon

Chinese name
- Traditional Chinese: 陳詩武
- Simplified Chinese: 陈诗武
Transcriptions
Standard Mandarin
- Hanyu Pinyin: Chén Shīwǔ
Southern Min
- Hokkien POJ: Tân Si-bú

Tan See Boo (Note: From common Singaporean romanisation practices; Chinese: 陳詩武; pinyin: Chén Shīwǔ; Pe̍h-ōe-jī: Tân Si-bú.) (18 June 1833 – 25 November 1884) was a Chinese missionary who moved to Singapore in 1856 to assist the Presbyterian Church's local chapter. He subsequently joined the Plymouth Brethren and actively sought to convince other Christians to leave the Presbyterian Church too. Tan was twice married.

== Early life ==
Tan See Boo was born on 18 June 1833 in Xiamen, China. In 1854, at the direction of William Chalmers Burns, who was the first Presbyterian missionary in China, Tan converted to Christianity and renounced his profession of carving wood idols for household shrines. Tan was consequently disowned by his father.

== Career ==
After receiving his formal theological education in Xiamen, Tan began life as a missionary in 1856. At the request of Thomas McKenzie Fraser, a Free Church of Scotland minister, Tan moved to Singapore to become the Chinese catechist of the recently established Saint Andrew's Church Mission, which was supported by both Presbyterian and Anglican missionaries.

The mission was based at the Chinese Girls' School on Beach Road; Tan resided in a makeshift chapel at the school and received a salary of £28, which was doubled a year later. However, Tan left the mission shortly afterwards because he could not accept the rituals of his Anglican counterparts.

After Fraser relocated to Australia in 1860, Tan partnered with English missionaries Alexander Grant and Benjamin Keasberry. Together with Keasberry, Tan founded the Bukit Timah-based Glory Presbyterian Church, which was the first Chinese church in Singapore.

In 1864, Tan was formally appointed as an elder of the Chinese Presbyterian congregation in Singapore. In June 1866, Tan left the Presbyterian Church because he disagreed with its teachings on baptism and financial support. Tan had previously requested the Church's permission to return to Xiamen to study medicine and be ordained as a Presbyterian minister who would then be able to perform baptisms, but this was denied for unspecified reasons.

In 1867, after aligning himself with the Plymouth Brethren, Tan established a Chinese "gospel hall" and would live in its North Bridge Road premises until his death. Tan contributed to a sizeable portion of the hall's building fund after selling his wife's jewellery as well as medicine to opium addicts. On 8 May, Tan was "rebaptised" by Brethren member John Chapman, who had arrived in Malaya in 1859.

On multiple occasions afterwards, Tan returned to China in the hopes of convincing other local Presbyterians to join the Plymouth Brethren instead. Much to the consternation of Presbyterian missionaries in Minnan, Tan taught that Sabbath observance was not mandatory for converts. According to contemporaneous accounts, Tan was more successful in getting rural believers to leave the Presbyterian Church.

== Personal life ==
In 1858, Tan married Yeo Geok Neo, who was an alumna of the Chinese Girls' School. Their son, Teck Soon, was born in 1859. Yeo died in 1863, at the age of 22. A year later, Tan married Ang Choo Neo (also known as Primrose Vanderhoven), who was the adopted daughter of a Dutch captain; they had eight sons, one of whom was adopted, and three daughters. On 25 November 1884, Tan died at the age of 51.
