= Non-medical mask =

Non-medical masks may refer to:

- cloth face masks
- respirators not intended for medical use (e.g., dust masks)
- daily protective masks similar to surgical masks, but not intended for medical use (e.g., GB/T 32610 standard)
