= Tan Teck Soon =

Singaporean intellectual (1859–1922)

- Traditional Chinese: 陳德順
- Simplified Chinese: 陈德顺
Transcriptions
Standard Mandarin
- Hanyu Pinyin: Chén Déshùn
Southern Min
- Hokkien POJ: Tân Tek-sūn

Tan Teck Soon (simplified Chinese: 陈德顺; traditional Chinese: 陳德順; pinyin: Chén Déshùn; Pe̍h-ōe-jī: Tân Tek-sūn; 1859 – 25 November 1922) was a Chinese intellectual and writer active in Singapore. He was the son of missionary Tan See Boo.

== Early life ==
Tan was born in 1859 in Singapore. His father was Chinese missionary Tan See Boo. His mother, Yeo Geok Neo, was an alumna of the Chinese Girls' School. Tan attended Raffles Institution and was particularly proficient in Chinese studies. As a teenager, Tan often helped his father to translate his letters to overseas missionaries from Chinese to English. In 1873, he became the first Straits Chinese recipient of the Guthrie Scholarship for Chinese boys, which allowed him to further his studies at the Anglo-Chinese College in Xiamen, China.

== Career ==
After completing his further studies, Tan returned to Singapore to work as a civil servant. He subsequently joined the private sector, serving as part of Kim Ching & Co's consulate in Thailand. Tan was also an active member of the Singapore Chinese Educational Institute, the Straits Chinese Christian Association, the Anti-Opium League, and the Chinese Philomathic Society.

In 1893, Tan co-founded the Straits Philosophical Society, whose membership was limited to 15 and required one to be of "distinguished merit", a university graduate, or a member of a European learned society; alongside Lim Boon Keng, who was admitted into the society in 1895, Tan was one of its two Chinese members. In 1894, Tan and Presbyterian minister Archibald Lamont purchased the Daily Advertiser, which Tan had been the editor of since 1890. Tan also co-authored a book on Chinese expatriates in Singapore, titled Bright Celestials: The Chinaman at Home and Abroad (1894), with Lamont.

Tan frequently wrote for the Straits Chinese Magazine, a quarterly journal that ran from 1897 to 1907. In 1898, together with Lim Boon Keng and Chinese scholar Khoo Seok Wan, Tan established the Chinese-language newspaper Thien Nan Shin Pao; he served as its general manager from 1898 to 1905.

== Later years ==
Tan withdrew from public life in his later years. He became increasingly drawn to Buddhism and was a supporter of the Maha Bodhi Society founded by Sri Lankan revivalist Anagarika Dharmapala. Tan died on 25 November 1922 at the age of 63.
