= Harbin Medical University =

Public university in Heilongjiang, China

- 哈尔滨医科大学 (Chinese)
- Type: Public
- Established: 1926
- Affiliations: WHO; IMED; MCI; BMCI; ASRMU
- President: Zhang Xue
- Location: Harbin, Heilongjiang, China
- Campus: Urban
- Website: www.hrbmu.edu.cn

Chinese name
- Simplified Chinese: 哈尔滨医科大学
- Traditional Chinese: 哈爾濱醫科大學
Transcriptions
Standard Mandarin
- Hanyu Pinyin: Hā'ěrbīn Yīkē Dàxué

Harbin Medical University (HMU) (Chinese: 哈尔滨医科大学) is a public university located in Harbin, Heilongjiang, China.

HMU is appointed as a national education and training base for biomedical scientists and teaching talents by the National Bureau of Advanced Health Care Education, and a key university of Heilongjiang Province in the national "211 Project".

== History ==
Harbin Medical University (HMU) is located in Harbin, Heilongjiang province. HMU has a scenic green campus of 2.36 million square meters with buildings of ancient architecture styles.

HMU was founded in 1926. It originated from merger of old Harbin Medical University (a.k.a. Harbin Special Medical School, founded by a pioneer Malaysian medical doctor in China, Dr. Lien-teh Wu) and the former first and second branch schools of Xingshan Chinese Medical University (a.k.a. Chinese Red Army Health School founded in 1931 in Ruijin, Jiangxi).

== Academics ==
=== Affiliated Institutions ===
The affiliated institutions of HMU includes:

- School of Basic Medical Sciences
- School of Public Health
- School of Pharmacy
- School of Health Administration
- Department of Bioinformatics
- Department of Humanities and Social Sciences
- Graduate School
- School of Adult Education (School of Continuing Education)
- Six medical schools (Affiliated hospitals)
- School of Dentistry
- School of Nursing
- Daqing Campus

Organizations based in HMU includes:

- Center for Endemic Disease Control of CDC
- National Research Center for Clinical Trial of New Drugs
- Russian Language Training Center of the Ministry of Health
- Heilongjiang Branch of China Medical Academy
- College of International Education
- Heilongjiang Provincial Medical Academy

=== Reputation & Recognition ===
Harbin Medical University is enlisted in the official medical directories of World Health Organization (WHO), International Medical Education Directory (IMED) and World Directory of Medical Schools (WDOMS).

Its Doctor of Medicine (M.D.) degree is recognized by the Medical Council of India (MCI), Bangladesh, Jordan and many other Asian countries without a requirement for degree audition and validation. In countries of North America, Europe or other continents, such as USA, Canada, UK, Australia, M.D. graduates of HMU can obtain a medical license after passing specific board exams required in those countries if the Currency of Practice requirement is met.

=== Membership ===
Harbin Medical University is a full member of the following international organizations and associations:

- Asian Medical Education Association (AMEA)
- Educational Commission for Foreign Medical Graduates (ECFMG)
- Foundation for Advancement of International Medical Education and Research (FAIMER)
- Association of Sino-Russian Medical Universities (ASRMU)

=== Medical Programs ===
HMU has clearly defined medical programs. It is among the first group of medical universities with a seven-year medical program and has been working with Nankai University and Harbin Institute of Technology in jointly teaching these seven-year program students (ended in 2012). HMU cooperates with five foreign universities for joint medical programs. It has four first-grade doctorate degree programs including basic medical sciences, clinical medicine, public health and preventive medicine, and biology; 41 second-grade doctorate degree programs, and 49 second-grade master's degree programs. The 11 undergraduate programs include basic medical sciences, clinical medicine, preventive medicine, dentistry, anesthesiology, medical imaging, nursing, pharmacy, biotechnology, public affairs management, and medical law. Currently, HMU has five postdoctoral research programs in preventive medicine, clinical medicine, basic medical sciences, biology, and pharmacy, one research program in clinical pharmacy and pharmacology, and the postdoctoral research program in collaboration with Zhonglong Enterprises. There are over 10,000 full-time students, including over 3000 graduate students.

HMU has a reasonable discipline structure. There is one national key discipline, 32 provincial key disciplines, one incubation base of national key laboratories in biomedicine jointly established by the ministry and the province, six key laboratories of the ministry and the province, and 11 provincial key laboratories of higher education. Positions are available for national and provincial specially-invited professors. Undergrade five-year MBBS programme is available in English language. Chinese language MBBS programme is also available.

The following three-year MD/MS & PhD specialties are available in English:

- School of Clinical Medicine
  - Pathology and Pathophysiology, Pediatrics, Gerontology, Neurology, Psychiatry and Mental Health, Dermatology and Venereology, Imaging and Nuclear Medicine, Clinical Laboratory Diagnostics, Nursing, Surgery, Gynecology and Obstetrics, Otolaryngology, Oncology, Emergency Medicine, Oral Clinical Medicine, Nutrition and Food Hygiene, Master of Nursing, Social Medicine and Health Management, Master of Nursing, Clinical Science of Stomatology
- School of Basic Medical Sciences
  - Physiology, Neurobiology, Genetics, Developmental Biology, Cell Biology, Biochemistry and Molecular Biology, Human Anatomy and Histoembryology, Immunology, Pathogen Biology, Pathology and Pathophysiology, Forensic Medicine, History of Science and Technology
- School of Public Health
  - Pathogen Biology, Labor Sanitation and Sanitary Science, Nutrition and Food Hygiene, Maternal Child, Adolescent and Woman Health Care, Hygiene Toxicology, Master of Public Health (professional degree), Social Medicine and Health Services Management
- Center for Epidemic Disease
  - Epidemic and Health Statistics, Labor Sanitation and Sanitary Science, Determination of Trace Elements and the Effect on Health
- School of Pharmacy
  - Physiology, Pharmacochemistry, Pharmacy, Microbial and Biochemical Pharmacy, Pharmacology
  - Master in Pharmacy (Professional Degree)
- School of Biological Information and Technology
  - Biophysics, Biomedical Engineering
- School of Humanity and Social Sciences
  - Ideological and Political Education

=== Faculty ===
There are over 10,000 faculty and staff.

=== Scientific Achievements ===
Significant breakthroughs have been made in China Human Genome Project, cytogenetical research on solid tumor, basic and clinical research on series of spleen preservation operation, experiment and clinical application of homogeneous in situ heart transplantation, research on the best target of antiarrhythmic drugs and etiology of Kaschin-Beck disease. In order to make full use of HMU resources, HMU cooperates with some enterprises, e.g. the Pharmaceutical R&D Center between HMU and Harbin Pharmaceutical Group, to facilitate the transformation of pharmaceutical technology to new products and lead the pharmaceutical industry at the northeastern old industrial base to rapid development.

There are five medical schools (affiliated hospitals). Allogeneic organ transplantation is a speciality of HMU. There are 2905 beds in the other four non-affiliated clinical hospitals.

HMU library has a collection of over 1.5 million books, 4707 journals and 330,000 electronic journals and books and provides electronic literature search and internet information services.

=== Rankings and reputation ===
University rankings

Global – Overall
- USNWR Global: 1030 (2024)

Regional – Overall
- USNWR Asia: 327 (2024)

National – Overall
- USNWR National: 133 (2024)

==== Academic Ranking of World Universities (ARWU) ====
Academic Ranking of World Universities (ARWU), also known as the Shanghai Ranking, is one of the annual publications of world university rankings. It's the first global university ranking with multifarious indicators.

Year	Rank	Valuer
2023	5	ARWU Best Chinese Universities Ranking - Ranking of Chinese Medical Universities
2024	5	ARWU Best Chinese Universities Ranking - Ranking of Chinese Medical Universities

==== CUAA (Chinese Universities Alumni Association) ====
Universities Ranking of China released by CUAA (Chinese Universities Alumni Association, Chinese: 中国校友会网) is one of the most foremost domestic university rankings in China.

Year	Rank	Valuer
2020	21	CUAA China Regional University Ranking
2020	105	CUAA China University Ranking
2021	15	CUAA China Non Double First Class University Ranking
2021	85	CUAA China University Ranking
2022	104	CUAA China University Ranking
2023	103	CUAA China University Ranking
2024	102	CUAA China University Ranking

==== Nature Index ====
Nature Index tracks the affiliations of high-quality scientific articles and presents research outputs by institution and country on monthly basis.

Year	Rank	Valuer
2022	206	Nature Index - Academic Institutions - China
2023	145	Nature Index - Academic Institutions - China
2024	171	Nature Index - Academic Institutions - China

==== Center for World University Rankings (CWUR) ====
Center for World University Rankings (CWUR) is a leading consulting organization providing policy advice, strategic insights, and consulting services to governments and universities to improve educational and research outcomes.

Year	Rank	Valuer
2023	703	Center for World University Rankings
2024	677	Center for World University Rankings

==== U.S. News & World Report Best Global Universities Ranking ====
Year	Rank	Valuer
2022	1027	U.S. News Best Global Universities Ranking
2024	1030	U.S. News Best Global Universities Ranking
