= Zhaozhou County =

Zhaozhou County 肇州县
- County
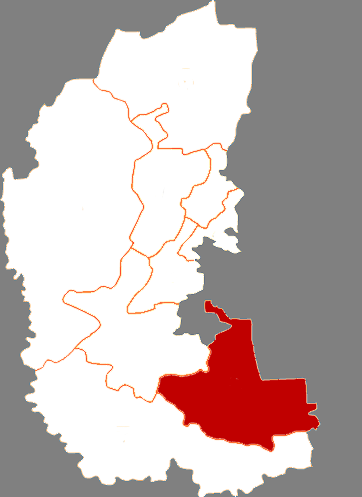
- Zhaozhou in Daqing

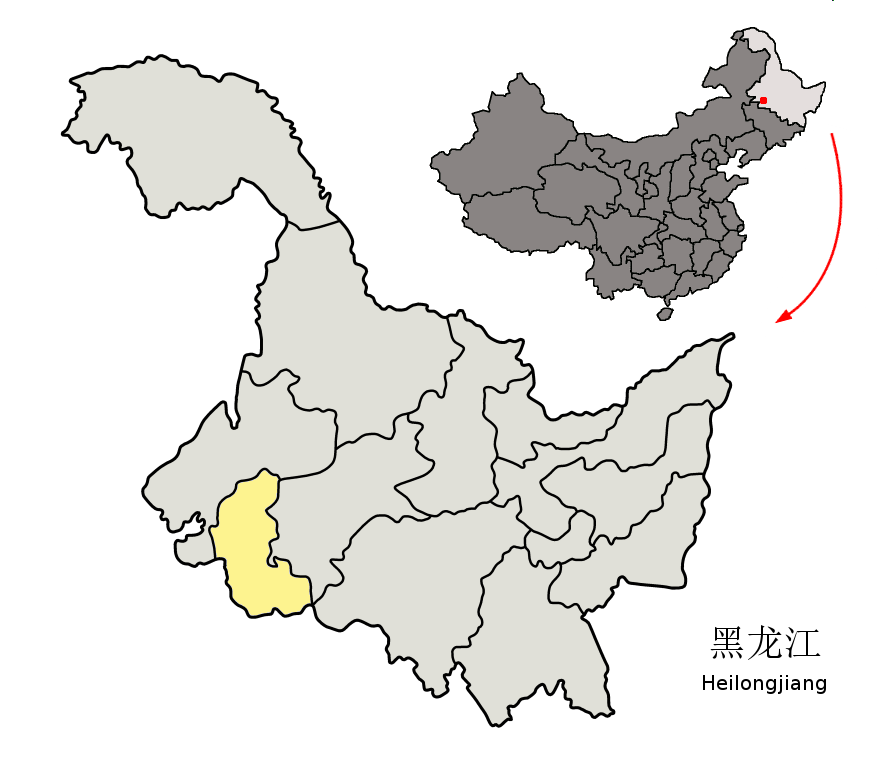
- Daqing in Heilongjiang
- Coordinates: 45°41′56″N 125°16′08″E
- Country: People's Republic of China
- Province: Heilongjiang
- Prefecture-level city: Daqing

Area
  - Total: 2,445 km^{2} (944 sq mi)

Population (2010)
  - Total: 387,463
  - Density: 158.5/km^{2} (410.4/sq mi)
- Time zone: UTC+8 (China Standard)

Zhaozhou County (simplified Chinese: 肇州县; traditional Chinese: 肇州縣; pinyin: Zhàozhōu Xiàn) is a county of southwestern Heilongjiang province, People's Republic of China, bordering Jilin province to the south. It is under the jurisdiction of the prefecture-level city of Daqing.

== History ==
History of Jin says that in the eighth year of Tianhui (during the reign of Emperor Jianwen of Jin) since the Taizu defeated the Liao dynasty, the King Zhaoji was here. And he was built as a state with a county called Shixing. Because of its name Zhaozhou, it was called Zhaozhou.

== Administrative divisions ==
Zhaozhou County is divided into 6 towns and 6 townships.

6 towns

- Zhaozhou (肇州镇), Yongle (永乐镇), Fengle (丰乐镇), Zhaoyanggou (朝阳沟镇), Xingcheng (兴城镇), Erjing (二井镇)

6 townships

- Shuangfa (双发乡), Tuogu (托古乡), Zhaoyang (朝阳乡), Yongsheng (永胜乡), Yushu (榆树乡), Xinfu (新福乡)

== Demographics ==
The population of the district was 424,602 in 1999.

== Climate ==
Climate data for Zhaozhou, elevation 149 m (489 ft), (1991–2020 normals, extremes 1981–2010)
Month	Jan	Feb	Mar	Apr	May	Jun	Jul	Aug	Sep	Oct	Nov	Dec	Year
Record high °C (°F)	3.0 (37.4)	12.8 (55.0)	22.6 (72.7)	31.1 (88.0)	35.4 (95.7)	39.0 (102.2)	37.4 (99.3)	36.7 (98.1)	32.7 (90.9)	27.6 (81.7)	16.1 (61.0)	8.7 (47.7)	39.0 (102.2)
Mean daily maximum °C (°F)	−11.5 (11.3)	−5.4 (22.3)	3.7 (38.7)	14.4 (57.9)	22.0 (71.6)	27.0 (80.6)	28.3 (82.9)	26.9 (80.4)	21.9 (71.4)	12.7 (54.9)	0.1 (32.2)	−9.7 (14.5)	10.9 (51.6)
Daily mean °C (°F)	−17.7 (0.1)	−12.2 (10.0)	−2.7 (27.1)	7.8 (46.0)	15.8 (60.4)	21.4 (70.5)	23.6 (74.5)	21.7 (71.1)	15.5 (59.9)	6.5 (43.7)	−5.3 (22.5)	−15.3 (4.5)	4.9 (40.9)
Mean daily minimum °C (°F)	−23.0 (−9.4)	−18.3 (−0.9)	−8.7 (16.3)	1.2 (34.2)	9.5 (49.1)	15.9 (60.6)	19.0 (66.2)	17.0 (62.6)	9.4 (48.9)	1.0 (33.8)	−10.1 (13.8)	−20.2 (−4.4)	−0.6 (30.9)
Record low °C (°F)	−40.7 (−41.3)	−39.2 (−38.6)	−25.8 (−14.4)	−11.9 (10.6)	−2.7 (27.1)	4.4 (39.9)	8.3 (46.9)	7.4 (45.3)	−2.8 (27.0)	−18.8 (−1.8)	−25.8 (−14.4)	−35.3 (−31.5)	−40.7 (−41.3)
Average precipitation mm (inches)	2.0 (0.08)	2.7 (0.11)	6.1 (0.24)	15.1 (0.59)	43.3 (1.70)	89.1 (3.51)	126.2 (4.97)	103.5 (4.07)	41.1 (1.62)	18.6 (0.73)	7.8 (0.31)	4.5 (0.18)	460 (18.11)
Average precipitation days (≥ 0.1 mm)	3.0	2.4	3.9	5.2	9.2	12.1	13.0	10.9	7.9	5.4	4.2	5.0	82.2
Average snowy days	5.0	3.8	5.1	1.4	0.1	0	0	0	0	1.5	5.4	6.9	29.2
Average relative humidity (%)	70	63	52	45	51	63	77	78	69	61	65	71	64
Mean monthly sunshine hours	211.8	232.9	274.3	269.0	286.1	268.5	251.6	249.1	256.0	227.9	194.7	189.0	2,910.9
Percentage possible sunshine	75	79	74	66	62	57	53	58	69	68	69	70	67
Source: China Meteorological Administration
