= Cloth face mask =

Mask made of common textiles worn over the mouth and nose

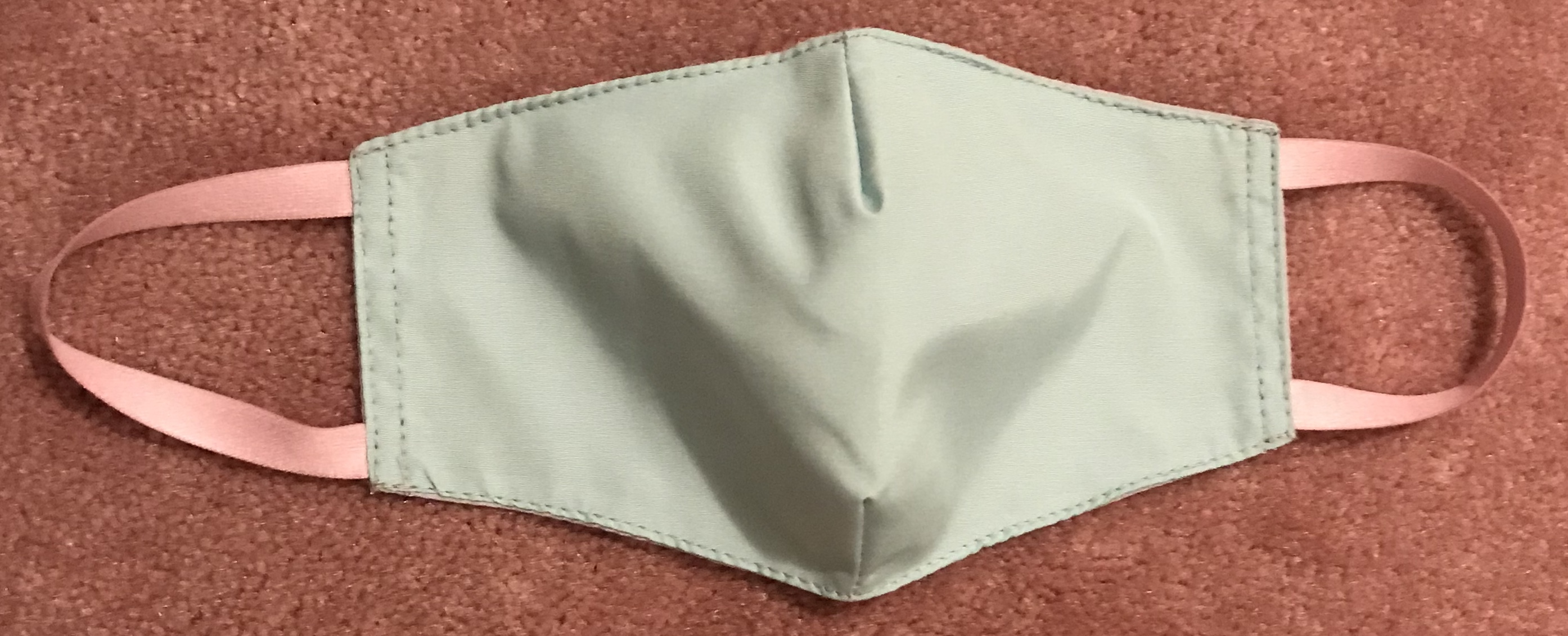
- A cloth face mask made out of 2-ply construction with layers of 85% polyester and 15% cotton fabric
- Other names: Fabric mask

A cloth face mask is a mask made of common textiles, usually cotton, worn over the mouth and nose. When more effective masks are not available, cloth face masks are recommended by public health agencies for disease source control in epidemic situations to protect others from virus-laden aerosols emitted by infected mask wearers' as they breathe, talk, cough, or sneeze.

Cloth masks are also used to reduce the risk of transmission to the wearer. Because they are less effective than N95 masks in protecting the wearer against viruses and other airborne particles, they are not considered to be personal protective equipment by public health agencies.

Cloth face masks were routinely used by healthcare workers starting from the late 19th century. They fell out of use in the developed world in favor of disposable surgical masks, and respirators with an electret (electrically charged) filter material, but cloth masks persisted in developing countries. During the COVID-19 pandemic, their use in developed countries was revived due to shortages, as well as for environmental concerns and practicality. Launderable cloth electret filters were also being developed.

== Usage ==
Guidance from the U.S. Centers for Disease Control and Prevention on using and making cloth masks during the COVID-19 pandemic

Prior to the COVID-19 pandemic, reusable cloth face masks were predominantly used by healthcare workers, and in the community, in developing countries and in Asia. Cloth face masks contrast with surgical masks and respirators such as N95 masks, which are made of nonwoven fabric and contain a layer or layers formed through a melt blowing process. Melt-blown materials have a fine, random, structure, which leads to excellent filtration properties. Respirators are regulated for their effectiveness based upon filtration efficiency of sub-micron sodium chloride particles (count median diameter 0.075 ± 0.020 μm; mass median diameter 0.26 μm), along with other criteria such as outer splash/spray protection, inner splash/spray absorption, contaminant accumulation and shedding, breathability (or pressure drop across the mask), and inflammability. Like surgical masks, and unlike respirators, cloth face masks do not provide a seal around the face, and prior to the 2019 COVID-19 outbreak were generally not authorized by institutions for protection from diseases recognized as airborne (e.g., tuberculosis).

In healthcare settings, they are used on sick patients as source control to reduce disease transmission through respiratory droplets and respiratory aerosols and by healthcare workers when surgical masks and respirators are unavailable. Cloth face masks are only recommended for use by healthcare workers as a last resort if supplies of surgical masks and respirators are exhausted. They are also used by the general public in household and community settings to reduce the risks of both infectious diseases and particulate air pollution and to contain the wearer's exhaled virus-laden droplets and aerosols.

Several types of cloth face masks are available commercially, especially in Asia. Homemade masks can also be improvised using bandanas, T-shirts, handkerchiefs, scarves, or towels. Depending on the design and materials, reusable cloth masks with incorporated filters can block particles as well as surgical masks.

== Recommendations ==
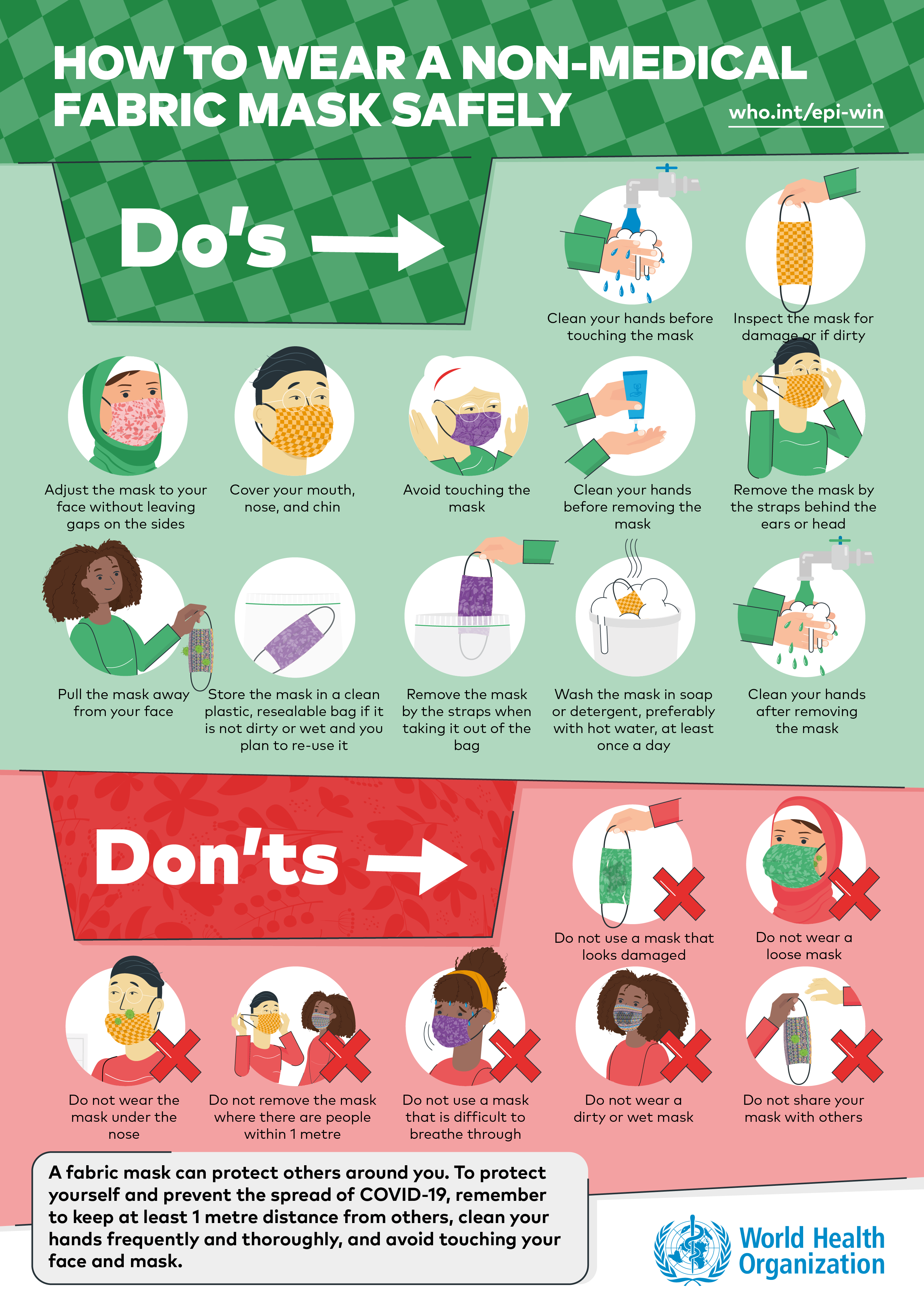
Infographic from the World Health Organization showing the do's and don'ts of wearing a fabric mask to prevent the spread of COVID-19

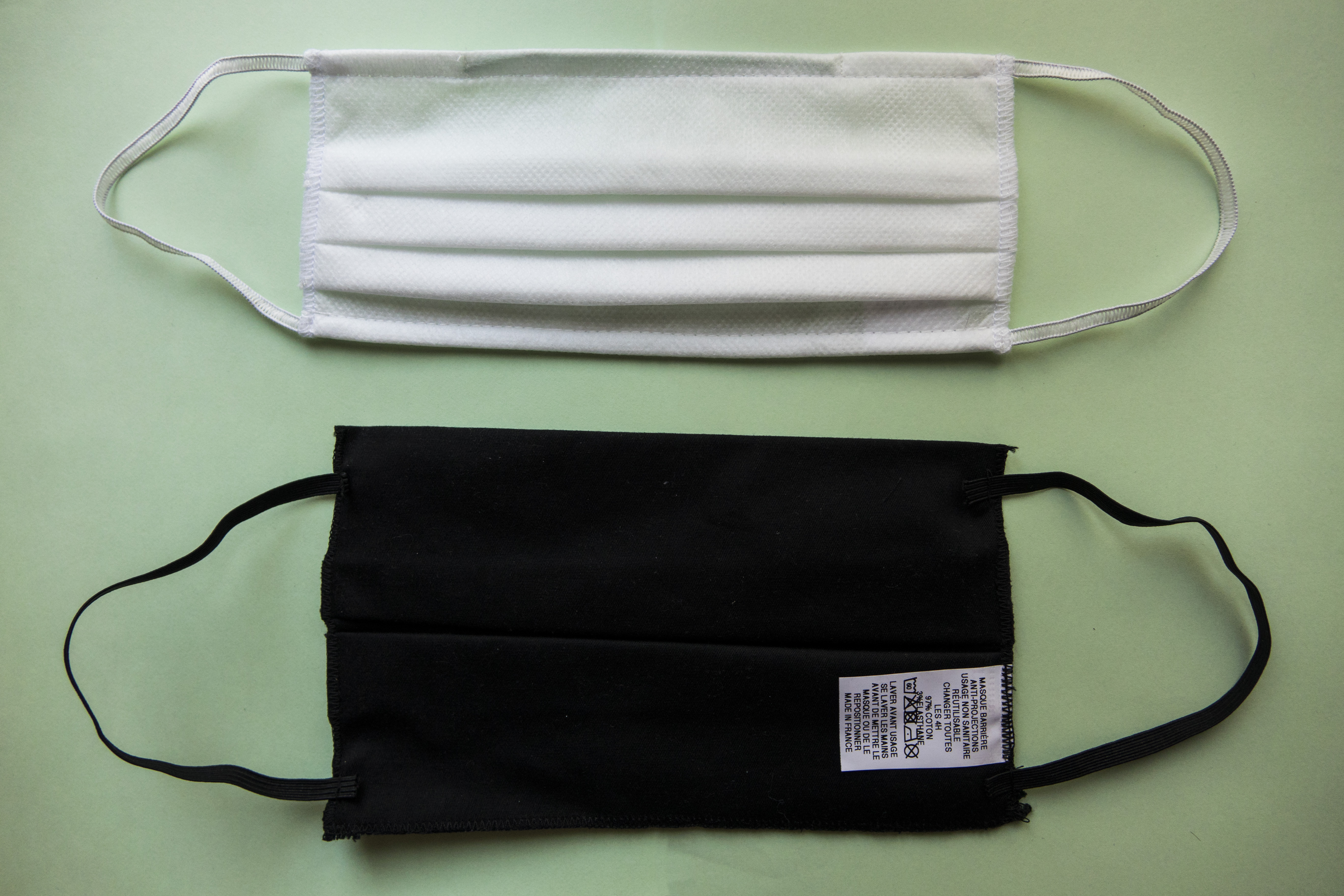
Two French cloth masks certified by AFNOR. The white mask is made of polypropylene and the black one is made of cotton.

The World Health Organization (WHO) continues to recommend that masks be used as part of a comprehensive strategy of measures to suppress transmission and save lives; the use of a mask alone is not sufficient to provide an adequate level of protection against COVID-19. The US Centers for Disease Control, along with Johns Hopkins University School of Medicine, The Mayo Clinic, and Cleveland Clinic all concur with this recommendation. The World Health Organization also recommended that those aged over 60 years old or with underlying health risks require more protection and should wear medical masks in areas where there is community transmission.

The World Health Organization recommends using masks with at least three layers of different materials. Two spunbond polypropylene layers offer useful increases in filtration with acceptable breathability. When producing cloth face masks, two parameters should be considered: filtration efficiency of the material and breathability. The filter quality factor known as "Q" is commonly used as an integrated filter quality indicator. It is a function of filtration efficiency and breathability, with higher values indicating better performance. Experts recommend Q-factor of three or higher. The usefulness of this ratio in selecting materials for masks has not, to our knowledge, been demonstrated.

A peer-reviewed summary of the filtration properties of cloth and cloth masks concluded that, pending further research, evidence is strongest for 2 to 4 layers of plain weave cotton or flannel, at least 100 thread count. A plain-language summary of this review is available.

Comparison of materials for fabric masks
Material (source)	Structure	Initial Filtration Efficiency (%)	Initial Pressure drop (Pa)	Filter quality factor, Q (kPa^{−1})
Polypropylene (interfacing material)	spunbond	6	1.6	16.9
Cotton (sweater)	knit	26	17	7.6
Cotton (T-shirt)	knit	21	14.5	7.4
Polyester (toddler wrap)	knit	17	12.3	6.8
Cotton (T-shirt)	woven	5	4.5	5.4
Cellulose (tissue paper)	bonded	20	19	5.1
Cellulose (paper towel)	bonded	10	11	4.3
Silk (napkin)	woven	4	7.3	2.8
Cotton (handkerchief)	woven	1.1	9.8	0.48
Cotton, gauze	woven	0.7	6.5	0.47
Nylon (exercise pants)	woven	23	244	0.4

== Efficiency ==
Cloth face masks can be used for source control to reduce disease transmission arising from the wearer's respiratory droplets and respiratory aerosols, and also to reduce risk for the wearer by filtering incoming aerosols, thereby reducing disease transmission, but are not considered personal protective equipment for the wearer in regulated or health-and-safety contexts Filtration efficiency of the material is typically low compared with non-woven materials used in surgical masks and respirators. However, a well-designed cloth mask may fit very well, with little edge leak. In contrast, surgical mask material is an excellent filter, but surgical masks typically fit poorly, with visible gaps and large edge leaks. This explains why cloth masks (less good filter, good fit) and surgical masks (good filter, less good fit) perform similarly in tests of protection of the wearer from aerosol-sized particles.

As of 2015, there had been no randomized clinical trials or guidance on the use of reusable cloth face masks. Most research had been performed in the early 20th century, before disposable surgical masks became prevalent. One 2010 study found that 40–90% of particles in the 20–1000 nm range penetrated a cloth mask and other fabric materials. The performance of cloth face masks varies greatly with the shape, fit, and type of fabric, as well as the fabric fineness and number of layers. As of 2006, no cloth face masks had been cleared by the U.S. Food and Drug Administration for use as surgical masks. A Vietnamese study of healthcare workers compared influenza-like illness outcome among those wearing cloth masks versus medical masks. They concluded that cloth masks were ineffective at preventing transmission in high-risk clinical settings. Although discouraged in clinical settings, cloth masks may still serve a useful role in reducing disease transmission in public settings according to a systematic review.

One role of masks worn by the general public is to "stop those who are already infected broadcasting the virus into the air around them" or source control. This is of particular importance with the COVID-19 pandemic, as transmission from people who are asymptomatic is a key feature of its rapid spread. For example, of the people on board the Diamond Princess cruise ship, 634 people were found to be infected—52% had no symptoms at the time of testing, including 18% who never developed symptoms. Best practice is to implement multiple prevention techniques to reduce risk, for example, increasing the proportion of outside air used in ventilation, filtration systems built into HVAC, stand-alone filtration systems such as HEPA filters and Corsi-Rosenthal boxes, avoiding crowded spaces, and practicing staying home while sick and for the period of probable infectiousness following illness.

Compared with bacteria recovery from unmasked volunteers, a mask made of muslin and flannel reduced bacteria recovered on agar sedimentation plates by 99%, total airborne microorganisms by 99%, and bacteria recovered from aerosols (< 4 μm) by 88% to 99%. In 1975, 4 medical masks and 1 commercially produced reusable mask made of 4 layers of cotton muslin were compared. Filtration efficiency, assessed by bacterial counts, was 96% to 99% for the medical masks and 99% for the cloth mask; for aerosols (< 3.3 μm), it was 72% to 89% and 89%, respectively.

An experiment carried out in 2013 by Public Health England, that country's health-protection agency, found that a commercially made surgical mask filtered 90% of virus particles from the air coughed out by participants, a vacuum cleaner bag filtered out 86%, a tea towel blocked 72% and a cotton t-shirt 51%—though fitting any DIY mask properly and ensuring a good seal around the mouth and nose is crucial. The use of common fabrics in making face masks has been tested. Filter efficiency can be improved with multiple layers, but it is important also to consider breathability. Cotton is the most commonly used material, and filter efficiencies can reach > 80% for particles <. 300 nm with fabric combinations such as cotton-silk, cotton-chiffon, or cotton-flannel, though these filtration efficiencies are not directly comparable with the reported properties of surgical masks and respirators, because of the non-standard methods used in this study, conducted in the early months of the COVID-19 pandemic. The WHO recommended that cloth masks should have three layers with a hydrophilic inner layer (e.g., cotton) to absorb moisture from the wearer's breathing, a filter layer, ideally spunbond polypropylene, and a hydrophobic outer layers (e.g., polyester). The benefits of a hydrophobic outer layer have not been demonstrated, and may originate from the idea of protection from droplets, which is now recognized as not the dominant mode of transmission. Masks should be cleaned after each use. They can either be laundered or hand-washed in soapy hot water and dried with high heat.

== History ==
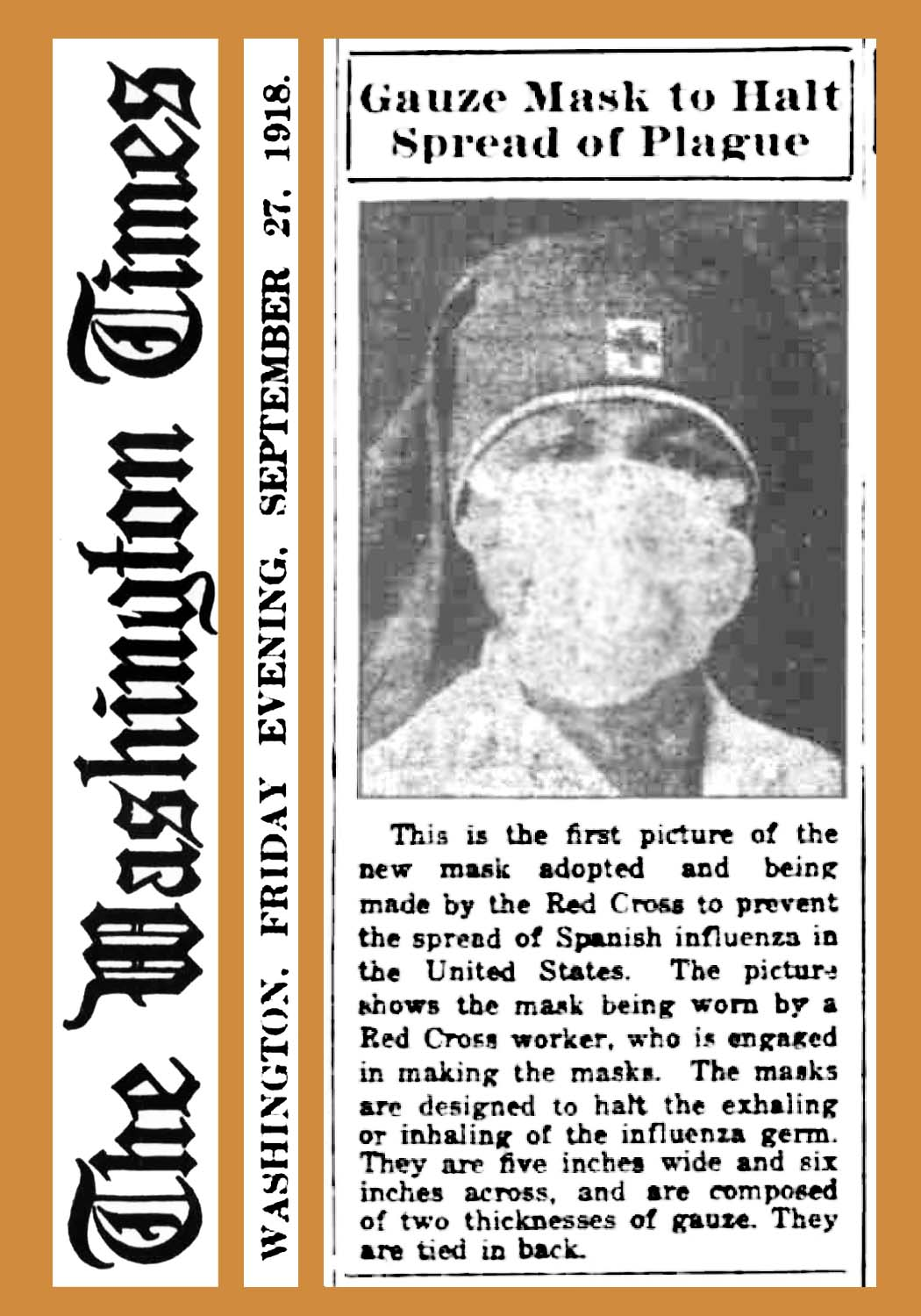
In 1918, the Red Cross recommended two-layer gauze masks.

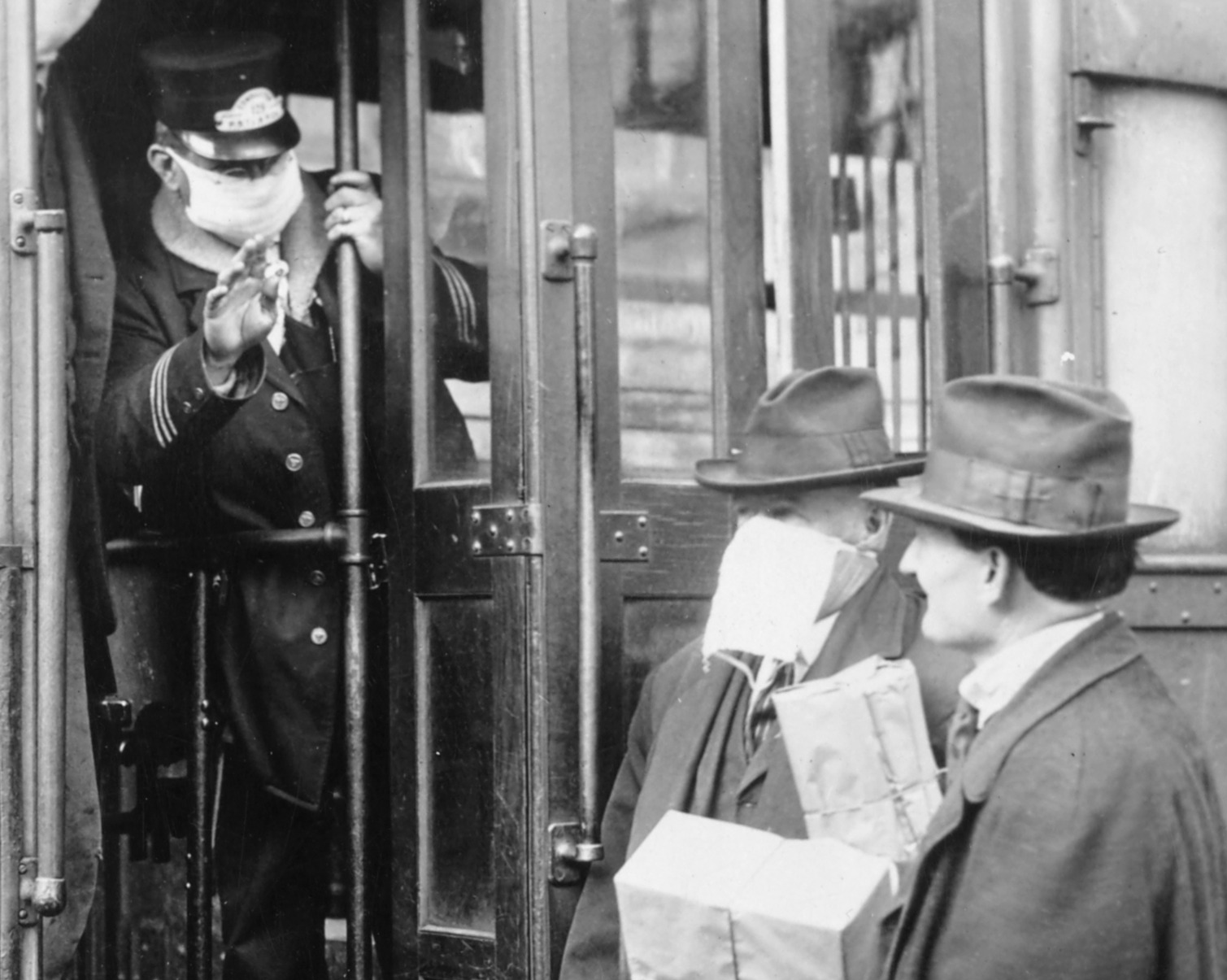
During the 1918 flu pandemic, a streetcar conductor in Seattle refuses a person who attempts to board without wearing a mask.

In Roman times, Pliny the Elder recommended that miners use animal bladders to protect against inhaling lead oxides. Some followers of Jainism, which originated in India around 500 B.C.E, wear cloth masks to avoid accidentally inhaling insects as part of practicing ahimsa. In the 16th century, Leonardo da Vinci advised the use of a wet woven cloth to protect against toxic agents of chemical warfare. In the early modern period, the plague-doctor costume included a beaked face-mask worn to protect the wearer from infectious "miasma".

Conventional cowboy attire in the American West often included a bandanna, which could protect the face from blown dust and also potentially doubled as a means of obscuring identity.

In 1890 William Stewart Halsted pioneered the use of rubber gloves and surgical face masks, although some European surgeons such as Paul Berger and Jan Mikulicz-Radecki had worn cotton gloves and masks earlier. These masks became commonplace after World War I and the influenza pandemic of 1918. Cloth face masks were promoted by Wu Lien-teh in the 1910–11 Manchurian pneumonic plague outbreak, although Western medics doubted their efficacy in preventing the spread of disease.

Cloth masks were largely supplanted by modern surgical masks made of nonwoven fabric in the 1960s. Peer-reviewed evidence supporting their equivalence appears to be lacking. The use of cloth masks continued in developing countries. They were used in Asia during the 2002–2004 SARS outbreak, and in West Africa during the 2013–2016 Ebola epidemic. Compared with bacteria recovery from unmasked volunteers, a mask made of muslin and flannel reduced bacteria recovered on agar sedimentation plates by 99%, total airborne microorganisms by 99%, and bacteria recovered from aerosols (<4 μm) by 88% to 99%. In 1975, four medical masks and one commercially produced reusable mask made of four layers of cotton muslin were compared. Filtration efficiency, assessed by bacterial counts, was 96% to 99% for the medical masks and 99% for the cloth mask; for aerosols (<3.3 μm), it was 72% to 89% and 89%, respectively.

=== COVID-19 pandemic ===
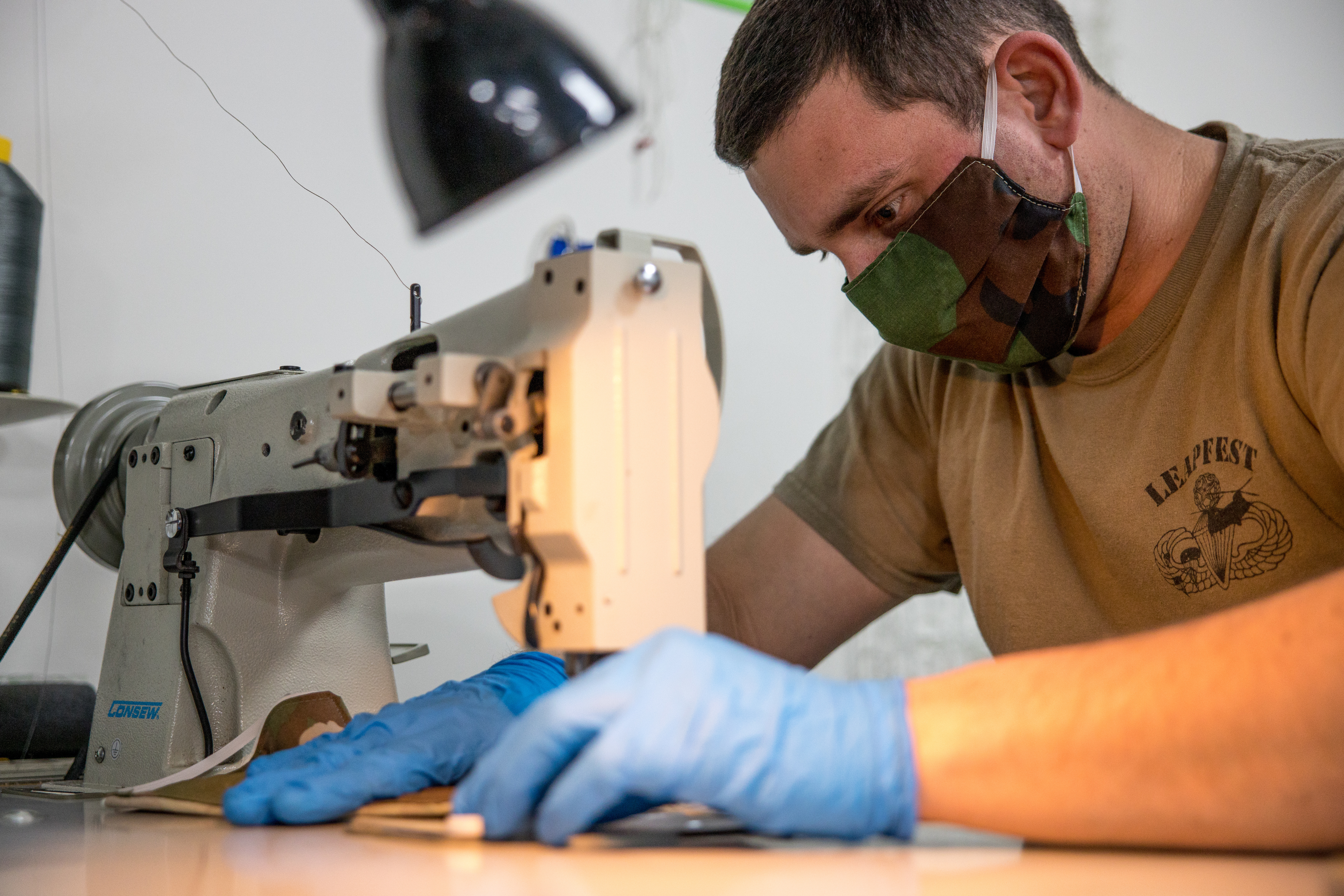
Rhode Island National Guardsmen sew face masks during the COVID-19 pandemic, April 6, 2020.

In the early years of the COVID-19 pandemic, most countries recommended the use of cloth masks to reduce the spread of the virus.

On June 5, 2020, WHO changed its advice on face masks, recommending that the general public should wear fabric masks where widespread COVID-19 transmission exists and physical distancing is not possible (for example, "on public transport, in shops or in other confined or crowded environments"). The WHO continues to recommend their use: 'Masks should be used as part of a comprehensive strategy of measures to suppress transmission and save lives; the use of a mask alone is not sufficient to provide an adequate level of protection against COVID-19.' The CDC also continues to recommend masking: 'Wearing a mask is an additional prevention strategy that you can choose to further protect yourself and others.'

== See also ==
- N95 - a mask designed to stop the spread of airborne disease, e.g., tuberculosis and for use in industrial settings
- Nose filter
