= Cheah Cheang Lim =

Malaysian businessman (1875–1948)

Cheah Cheang Lim (Chinese: 謝昌林; Pe̍h-ōe-jī: Chiā Chhiang-lîm; pinyin: Xiè Chānglín; Jyutping: Ze6 Coeng1 Lam4; 6 December 1875 in Taiping, Perak, Malaysia – 15 November 1948) was a Malaysian businessman and miner. Brought up by his father, Cheah Boon Hean, who was in the trading business. He was introduced to the tin mining industries of the time by his uncle Foo Choo Choon, the 'Tin King', who hired him as his attorney. Later, Cheah Cheang Lim was appointed to manage his affairs. Eventually, he started his own company. He also invested in rubber estates but his main interest remained in the tin business.

Cheah was also known as a social reformer whose concerns were spread across various issues. He was involved in the anti-opium movement and campaigned for Chinese status in the Malay States, including such efforts as debating against the Banishment Enactment to non-Malays born in the States. He furthermore dedicated his life to promoting and improving Malayan education by instituting several scholarship schemes, including the Queen's Scholarships in British Malaya and through donations.

Volunteering in the Malayan Volunteer Infantry was a significant part of his later career, as he led the younger generation in a volunteer programme. He was active in several clubs and societies across Malaysia, but mainly in Perak and Penang, where he resided. He was lastly elected as a Federal Counsellor, as a representative of the Chinese population.

== Early life ==
Cheah Cheang Lim was born to a Penang Hokkien family in Taiping and started out as a postal assistant on the Perak frontier. Growing up, he spent his early years in Taiping. His father was Cheah Boon Hean, son of Cheah Teah and a businessman and trader. His mother was Foo Kang Nyong. At that time, British administrative branches occupied the area, together with the Perak Sikhs, the police force. The Residential System was in practice. Later, a great fire destroyed the Cheah house. The family was invited to stay at Dr. Legge's residence until Cheah Boon Hean made new arrangements.

== Education ==
After attending a few temporary schools in Taiping, Cheah studied at the Central Government School, managed by Mr. J.L. Greene, now known as the King Edward VII School, up to Standard VI. In 1889, he finished school and applied for a job at the Land Office in Taiping. He was rejected due to his age. He went back to school, became a pupil teacher and studied privately for one year.

== Career ==
In 1890, he became a probationer at the Posts and Telegraphs Department. Later, he went to replace a brother officer in Port Weld and subsequently, to his friend Joo Sip San at Lahat, Perak. Cheah was a Malay scholar and helped with English correspondence, while he also taught the staff at the Posts and Telegraphs Department to read and write in the Malay language.

In 1894, Cheah took over R. Bulner as the postmaster in Tanjung Malim. He was later transferred back to Lahat, where he resigned, as a government office no longer satisfied his ambitions. He had planned to travel to China but was offered a job as the private secretary of Foo Choo Choon, his cousin, proprietor of the globally known Tronoh Mines. In 1900, he became the general manager. He worked under Foo Choo Choon for 14 years, until he decided to start his own mining business. His first mine was at Azar Dungsang.

In 1923, he was appointed a justice of peace for the State of Perak.

In 1927, he was elected as a member of the Federal Council to represent the Chinese community. He served for two terms, from 1927 to 1930 and from 1930 to 1933.

=== The Anti-Opium Movement ===
Cheah was an active supporter of the anti-opium movement. He was one of the founders of the Perak Anti-Opium Society, which was created in December 1906, and was elected as the treasurer. A similar organization was founded in Penang, presided by Dr.Wu Lien-teh. The first Anti-Opium Conference of the Straits Settlements and Federated Malay States was held in Ipoh in 1907. It attracted around 3,000 people. The second conference was renewed in 1908 with Mr. Foo Choo Choon as the chairman. It was held in Penang, as, at that time, Penang was a significant landmark in the manufacturing and export of opium to Perak and Southern Siam. In addition, mass meetings were conducted during those years.

By the time the First International Opium Convention Treaty was registered with the League of Nations in 1922, Cheah became the President of the Anti-Opium Society. Consequently, in October 1923, a joint Federated Malay States petition for the abolition of the opium trade was strengthened by 2,000 signatures. The ban on opium was finally applied 20 years after the beginning of the campaign. Cheah had dedicated 30 years of his life to the cause.

=== Benevolent works ===
- 1904: Donated a plot of land for the construction of the first Ipoh Maternity Hospital
- 1919: Instituted the Cheah Boon Hean Scholarship at his former school, King Edward VII School.
- 1922: Instituted the competitive Cheah Cheang Lim Scholarship in Anderson School, Anglo-Chinese School and St. Michael's Institution in Ipoh.
- 1924: Donated $500 to Westminster College in Fujian, China and was the third largest donor.
- 1927: Donated a classroom in the new Anglo-Chinese Girls' School

=== Clubs and organizations ===
- Committee member of the Perak Literary and Debating Society
- Committee member of Public Health Education, Kuala Lumpur
- Founding member of the Chinese Association of Malaya, Perak Turf Club and the Chinese Widows and Orphans Institution
- Patron of Hu Yew Seah, Penang
- President of the Radio Club, Penang

==== Honorary memberships ====
- Ipoh Club

==== Life memberships ====
- Royal Society of the Arts
- Royal Empire Society
- British Institute of Philosophical Studies
- Ipoh Gymkhana Club (now known as the Perak Turf Club)
- Garden Club, Singapore

==== Memberships ====
- Association of British Malaya
- Red Cross Society of China
- Chinese World Student Association of Shanghai
- Chinese Recreation Clubs of Penang, Selangor and Perak
- Chinese Chambers of Commerce of Perak and Penang
- Anglo-Chinese School Union, Penang
- Chinese Merchants Club, Penang
- Cheang Chew Hoy Kwan, Penang
- Chin Sim Seah, Ipoh
- Chin Woo Seah, Ipoh
- Decrepit Ward Fund, Taiping

==== Trusteeships ====
- Hokkien Kong Huey
- Chinese Widows and Orphans Institution
- Wah Yen Yee Theong (Chinese New Cemetery)
- Yok Choy School
- Perak Mining and Planting Association
- Cheah Kongsi, Penang

=== Properties ===
- Perak Lodge in Leith Street, George Town, Penang.
- Vihara Lodge in Jalan Tambun, Ipoh, Perak.
- Contributed to Penang Hill by building 'Westspur', a bungalow accessible via the Hill Railway.
- Adorable at Tanjung Bungah, Penang.

=== Cheah Kongsi ===
Cheah belonged to the third generation of the Cheah family trustees of Cheah Kongsi (谢公司) in Penang, his grandfather and father before him. He was also appointed honorary secretary. In 1918, he revised the rules and regulations of the organization to adjust to those times. The new constitution was published in 1921. Moreover, he undertook research on the Cheah history and lineage in China, the Cheah Kongsi history and the family cemetery, and came up with a pictorial compilation. In 1927, he was exempted from the obligation of attending the monthly meetings, due to his increasing commitment to the Federated Malay States. From 1931 to 1933, after the President, Cheah Choo Yew, died, Cheah Cheang Lim contributed to the renovation of the Cheah Kongsi. In 1934, he resigned his trusteeship, after 17 years of service, from 1917 to 1934.

=== Volunteering ===
In 1924, Cheah was requested by Colonel Parr to instill the volunteering spirit of the Straits Chinese youth. He thus volunteered as a second lieutenant and appointed Officer Commanding (OC), Chinese Platoon 1, in the Malayan Volunteer Infantry in Perak. In 1930, he was promoted to lieutenant.

== Family life ==
In 1896, Cheah married Khoo Pek Hua, a Penang-born Straits Chinese woman. She died on 6 March 1930, due to illness and the grief of losing of three daughters within five years. She was buried at the Cheah family cemetery at Pulau Tikus, Penang. She left Cheang Lim with one son and one daughter, named Cheah Ghim Leng and Cheah Liew Pin, respectively. Ghim Leng was previously a sergeant in the Chinese Company of the Penang and Province Wellesley Volunteer Force, before taking over his father's business in Ipoh. Later, he was appointed Officer Commanding Chinese Platoon I, Malayan Volunteer Infantry, in Perak. In 1935, he was elected a justice of the peace. In the beginning of the year 1941, he was awarded the Order of the British Empire and became a member of the Perak State Council.

Cheah remarried in July 1930. His second wife was an English-educated lady named Khoo Chin Choo. The couple adopted a girl named Cheah Liew Khin.

== Later years ==
After serving in the Federal Council, he retired from public life. He nevertheless hosted the occasional 'At Home', attended by honorable guests. Upon reaching 60 years of age, he hired Francis Cooray, author and journalist of The Malay Mail to write his biography. In 1946, he also helped in leading the formation of the second/third Penang Clerical Union

Cheah died on 16 November 1948, aged 77, in his home, at Leith Street, Penang. He was buried at Pulau Tikus, Penang. Lorong Cheah Cheang Lim in Ipoh, Perak is named after him.
