= Wu Lien-teh =

Malayan physician (1879–1960)

Ng Leen Tuck
- 伍連德
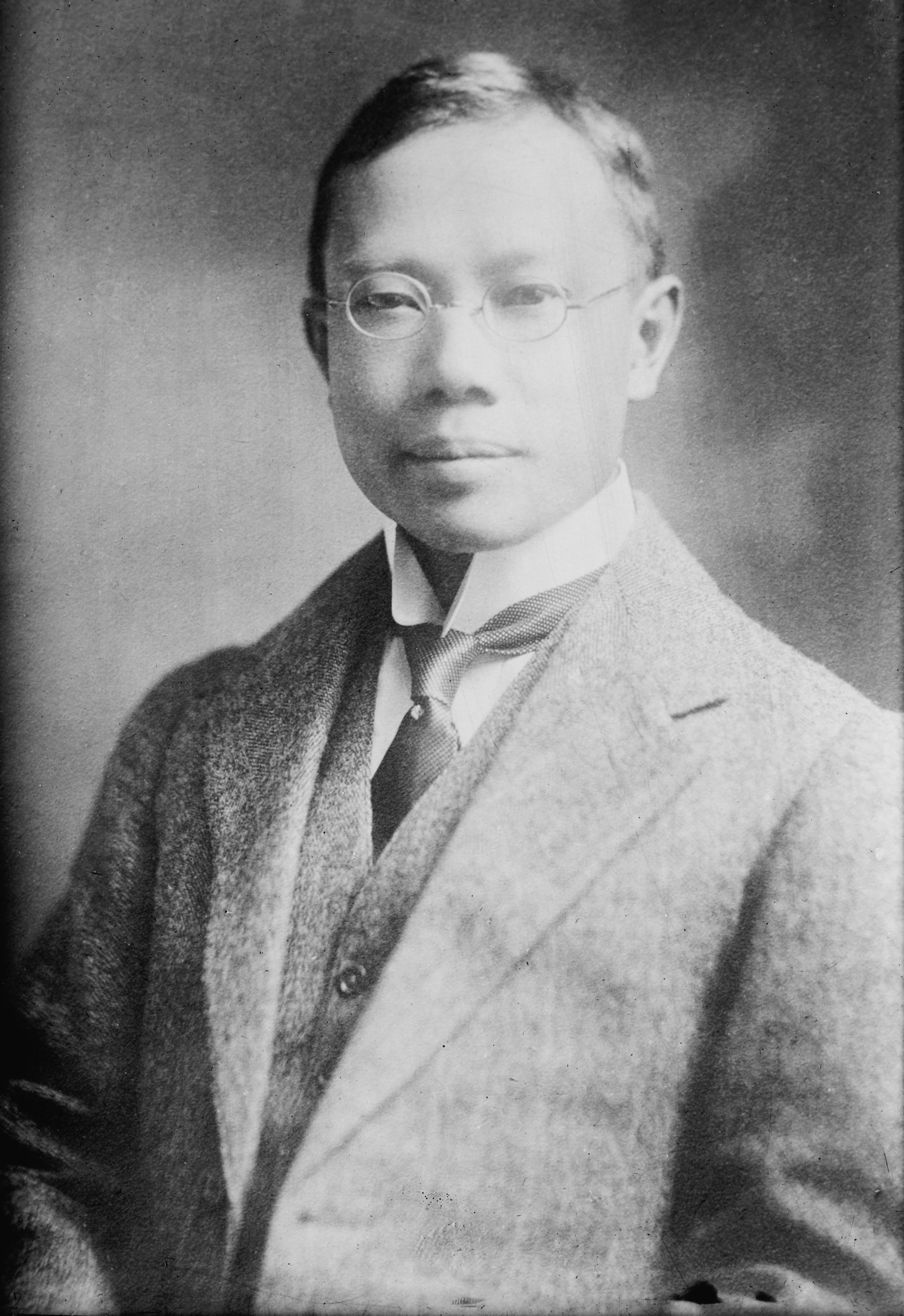
- Portrait of Dr. Wu Lien-Teh
- Born: 10 March 1879; Penang, Straits Settlements
- Died: 21 January 1960 (aged 80); Penang, Federation of Malaya
- Other names: Goh Lean Tuck, Ng Leen Tuck
- Education: University of Cambridge - Bachelor of Medicine and Bachelor of Surgery; Liverpool School of Tropical Medicine - Postgraduate Diploma in Bacteriology; University of Halle - Advance Diploma in Bacteriological Studies; Pasteur Institute - Master of Medicine in Infectious Diseases; University of Cambridge - Master of Medicine; University of Cambridge - Doctor of Medicine; University of Hong Kong - Doctor of Laws honoris causa
- Occupations: Medical Doctor, Physician, Researcher
- Years active: 1903–1959
- Known for: Work on the Manchurian Plague of 1910–11
- Notable work: Plague Fighter: The Autobiography of a Modern Chinese Physician
- Children: 7

Wu Lien-teh
- Traditional Chinese: 伍連德
- Simplified Chinese: 伍连德
Transcriptions
Standard Mandarin
- Hanyu Pinyin: Wǔ Liándé
- Wade–Giles: Wu^{3} Lien^{2}-tê^{2}
Yue: Cantonese
- Jyutping: Ng^{5} Lin^{4} Dak^{1}
Southern Min
- Hokkien POJ: Gó͘ Liân-tek

Wu Lien-teh (Chinese: 伍連德; pinyin: Wǔ Liándé; Jyutping: Ng^{5} Lin^{4} Dak^{1}; Pe̍h-ōe-jī: Gó͘ Liân-tek; Goh Lean Tuck and Ng Leen Tuck in Hokkien and Cantonese transliteration respectively; 10 March 1879 – 21 January 1960) was a Malayan physician renowned for his work in public health, particularly the Manchurian plague of 1910–11. He is the inventor of the Wu mask, which is the forerunner of today's N95 respirator.

Wu was the first medical student of Chinese descent to study at the University of Cambridge. He was also the first Malayan nominated for the Nobel Prize in Physiology or Medicine, in 1935.

== Life and education ==
Wu was born in Penang, one of the three towns of the Straits Settlements (the others being Malacca and Singapore), currently as one of the states of Malaysia. The Straits Settlements formed part of the colonies of the United Kingdom. His father was a recent immigrant of Ethnic Hoisanese background from Taishan, China, and worked as a goldsmith. Wu's mother's was of ethnic Hakka heritage and was a second-generation Peranakan born in Malaya. Wu had four brothers and six sisters. His early education was at the Penang Free School, a Church of England school.

Wu was admitted to Emmanuel College, Cambridge in 1896, after winning the Queen's Scholarship. His mother made him a Perakanan beadwork gift that depicted the College's coat of arms lion with creative licence. He had a successful career at university, winning virtually all the available prizes and scholarships. His undergraduate clinical years were spent at St Mary's Hospital, London and he then continued his studies at the Liverpool School of Tropical Medicine (under Sir Ronald Ross), the Pasteur Institute, Halle University, and the Selangor Institute.

Wu returned to the Straits Settlements in 1903. Some time after that, he married Ruth Shu-chiung Huang, whose sister was married to Lim Boon Keng, a Hokkien baba physician who promoted social and educational reforms in Singapore. The sisters were daughters of Wong Nai Siong, a Fuzhou revolutionary leader and educator who had moved to the area from 1901 to 1906.

Wu and his family moved to China in 1907. During his time in China, Wu's wife and two of their three sons died. With his wife Ms Huang's permission, towards the end of her life in Peking, Wu started a second family in Shanghai with Marie Lee Sukcheng, whom he had met in Manchuria. Wu had four children with Lee.

During the Japanese invasion of Manchuria, in November 1931, Wu was detained and interrogated by the Japanese authorities under suspicion of being a Chinese spy.

In 1937, during the Japanese occupation of much of China and the retreat of the Nationalists, Wu was forced to flee, returning to the Settlements to live in Ipoh. His home and all his ancient Chinese medical books were burnt.

In 1943 Wu was captured by Malayan left-wing resistance fighters and held for ransom. Then he nearly was prosecuted by the Japanese for supporting the resistance movement by paying the ransom, but was protected by having treated a Japanese officer.

== Career ==
In September 1903, Wu joined the Institute for Medical Research in Kuala Lumpur as the first research student. However, there was no specialist post for him because, at that time, a two-tier medical system in the British colonies provided that only British nationals could hold the highest positions of fully qualified medical officers or specialists. Wu spent his early medical career researching beri-beri and roundworms (Ascarididae) before entering private practice toward the end of 1904 in Chulia Street, George Town, Penang.

=== Opium ===
Wu was a vocal commentator on the social issues of the time. In the early 1900s, he became friends with Lim Boon Keng and Song Ong Siang, a lawyer who was active in developing Singapore's civil society. He joined them in editing The Straits Chinese Magazine. With his friends, Wu founded the Anti-Opium Association in Penang. He organised a nationwide anti-opium conference in the spring of 1906 that was attended by approximately 3000 people. This attracted the attention of the powerful forces involved in the lucrative trade of opium and, in 1907, this led to a search and subsequent discovery of one ounce of tincture of opium in Wu's dispensary, for which he was convicted and fined.

In 1908, Dr Wu accepted the then Grand Councillor Yuan Shikai's offer to become the Vice Director of the Imperial Army Medical College, now known as the Army Medical College, based in Tianjin, in 1908. This was established to train doctors for the Chinese Army.

=== Pneumonic plague ===
In the winter of 1910, Dr Wu Lien Teh was given instructions from the Foreign Office of the Imperial Qing court in Peking, to travel to Harbin to investigate an unknown disease that killed 99.9% of its victims. This was the beginning of the large pneumonic plague epidemic of Manchuria and Mongolia, which ultimately claimed 60,000 lives.

Wu was able to conduct a postmortem (usually not accepted in China at the time) on a Japanese woman who had died of the plague. Having ascertained via the autopsy that the plague was spreading by air, Wu invented the face mask which became the precursor of the N95 respirator. Gérald Mesny, a prominent French doctor who had come to replace Wu, refused to wear the mask and died days later of the plague. The mask was widely produced, with Wu overseeing the production and distribution of 60,000 masks in a later epidemic, and it featured in many press images.

Wu initiated a quarantine, arranged for buildings to be disinfected, and the old plague hospital to be burned down and replaced. The measure that Wu is best remembered for was in asking for imperial sanction to cremate plague victims. It was impossible to bury the dead because the ground was frozen, and the bodies could only be disposed of by soaking them in paraffin and burning them on pyres. Cremation of these infected victims turned out to be the turning point of the epidemic; days after cremations began, plague began to decline and within months it had been eradicated.

Wu chaired the International Plague Conference in Mukden (Shenyang) in April 1911, a historic event attended by scientists from the United States of America, the United Kingdom of Great Britain and Ireland, France, Germany, Italy, Austria-Hungary, the Netherlands, Russia, Mexico, and China. The conference took place over three weeks and featured demonstrations and experiments.

Wu later presented a plague research paper at the International Congress of Medicine, London in August 1911 which was published in The Lancet in the same month.

At the plague conference, epidemiologists Danylo Zabolotny and Anna Tchourilina announced that they had traced the initial cause of the outbreak to Tarbagan marmot hunters who had contracted the disease from the animals. A tarabagan became the conference mascot. However, Wu raised the question of why traditional marmot hunters had not experienced deadly epidemics before. He later published a work arguing that the traditional Mongol and Buryat hunters had established practices that kept their communities safe and he blamed more recent Shandong immigrants to the area (Chuang Guandong) for using hunting methods that captured more sick animals and increased risk of exposure.

=== Later career ===
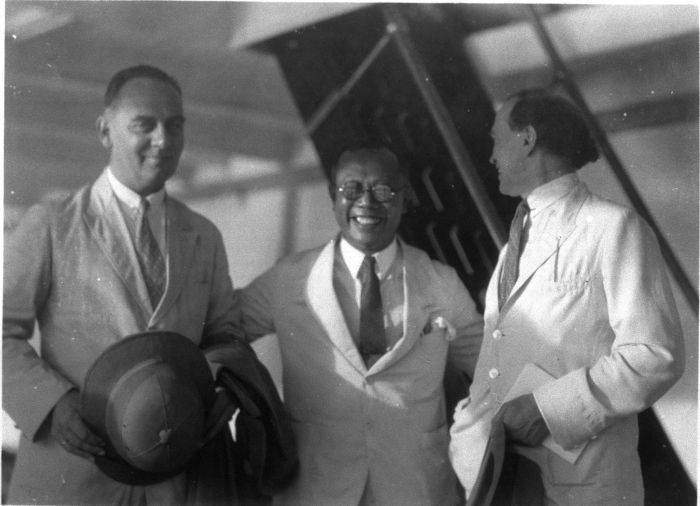
Group photo of Messrs. Jan van L., Dr. Wu Lien Teh and Professor De Langen, Tandjong Priok, Batavia, c. 1928

In 1912, Wu became the first director of the Manchurian Plague Service. He was a founder member and first president of the Chinese Medical Association (1916–1920).

Wu led the efforts to combat the 1920-21 cholera pandemic in the north-east of China.

In 1929, he was appointed a trustee of the 'Nanyang Club' in Penang by Cheah Cheang Lim, along with Wu Lai Hsi, Robert Lim Kho Seng, and Lim Chong Eang. The 'Nanyang Club', an old house in Beiping, China, provided convenient accommodation to overseas Chinese friends.

In the 1930s he became the first director of the National Quarantine Service.

Around 1939, Wu moved back to Malaya and continued to work as a general practitioner in Ipoh.

Wu collected donations to start the Perak Library (Now the Tun Razak Library) in Ipoh, a free-lending public library, and donated to Shanghai City Library and the University of Hong Kong.

Wu was a mandarin of the second rank and sat on advisory committees for the League of Nations. He was given awards by the Czar of Russia and the President of France, and was awarded honorary degrees by Johns Hopkins University, Peking University, University of Hong Kong, and University of Tokyo.

== Death and commemoration ==
Wu practised medicine until his death at the age of 80. He had bought a new house in Penang for his retirement and had just completed his 667-page autobiography, Plague Fighter, the Autobiography of a Modern Chinese Physician. On 21 January 1960, he died of a stroke while in his home in Penang.

There is a Dr. Wu Lien-teh Society, Penang.

The Wu Lien-teh Collection, which comprises 20,000 books, was given by Wu to the Nanyang University, which later became part of the National University of Singapore.

The Art Museum of the University of Malaya has a collection of Wu's paintings.

In 1995, Wu's daughter, Dr. Yu-lin Wu, published a book about her father, Memories of Dr. Wu Lien-teh, Plague Fighter.

In 2015, the Wu Lien-Teh Institute opened at Harbin Medical University.

In 2019, The Lancet launched an annual Wakley-Wu Lien Teh Prize in honour of Wu and the publication's founding editor, Thomas Wakley.

In 2024, Wu's great granddaughter, Associate Professor Shan Woo Liu, published a children's book about her great grandfather, Masked Hero: How Wu Lien-Teh Invented the Mask That Ended an Epidemic.

Dr. Wu Lien-teh is regarded as the first person to modernise China's medical services and medical education. In Harbin Medical University, bronze statues of him commemorate his contributions to public health, preventive medicine, and medical education.

=== Places named after Wu Lien-Teh ===
- A road named after Wu is found in Ipoh Garden South, a middle-class residential area in Ipoh, Malaysia.
- A residential area named Taman Wu Lien Teh is located near the Penang Free School in Malaysia.
- A school sporting house is named after Dr Wu at the Penang Free School, his alma mater.
- Jalan Doktor Wu Lien Teh in George Town, Penang, Malaysia
- There is a Dr Wu Lien-Teh Centre for Research on Communicable Diseases at the Universiti Tunku Abdul Rahman in Malaysia
- There is a Wu Lien-Teh Institute at the Harbin Medical University in China.

=== Commemoration during the COVID-19 pandemic ===
Wu's work in the medical field of public health had contemporary relevance during the COVID-19 pandemic.

In May 2020 Dr. Yvonne Ho united the 22 known living medical and scientific descendants of Dr. Wu Lien-Teh via video conferencing which spanned four continents and 14 cities around the world. In July 2020 some of these medical and scientific descendants collaborated to publish an article to memorialize his work in public health which was published in the South China Morning Post. In August 2020 a second group of Wu's medical and scientific descendants collaborated on another publication in the Malaysian The Star. In September 2020, Wu's medical and scientific descendants published a third publication in Singaporean Lianhe Zaobao.

In March 2021, Wu was honoured with a Google Doodle, depicting Wu assembling surgical masks and distributing them to reduce the risk of disease transmission.

=== Commemoration beyond the COVID-19 pandemic ===
In May 2026, The Lancet Voice podcast featured Dr Wu.
