= Face masks during the COVID-19 pandemic =

Health control procedure against COVID-19

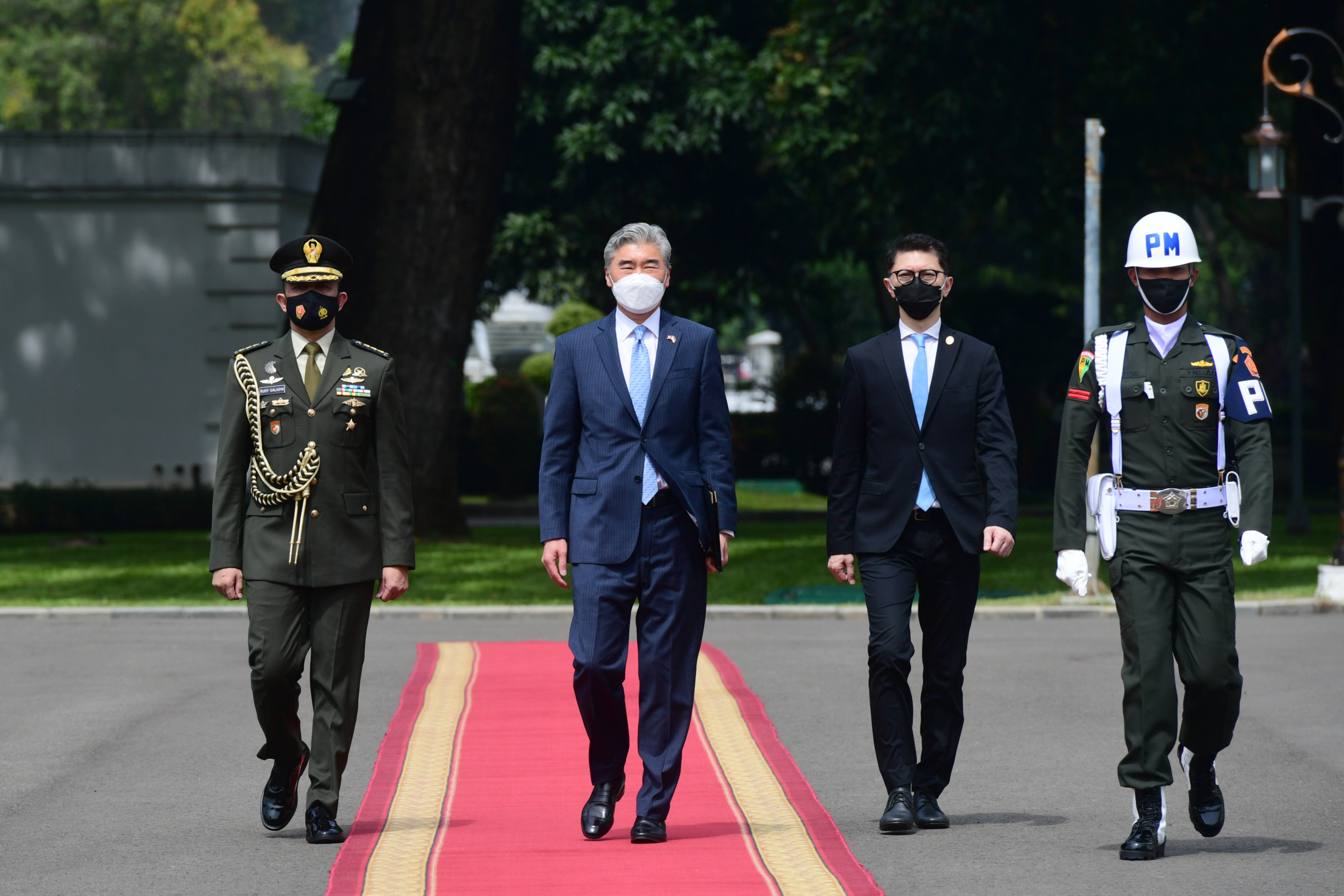
US Ambassador to Indonesia Sung Kim accompanied by local officials at the Presidential Palace wearing face masks amid the COVID-19 pandemic

During the COVID-19 pandemic, face masks or coverings, including N95, FFP2, surgical, and cloth masks, were used as public and personal health control measures against the spread of SARS-CoV-2, the virus that causes COVID-19.

In community and healthcare settings, the use of face masks was intended as source control to limit transmission of the virus and for personal protection to prevent infection. When properly worn, face masks can limit the respiratory droplets and aerosols that are spread by infected individuals, helping protect healthy individuals from infection.

Scientific studies concluded that the use of face masks was effective in protecting the individual using them against COVID-19. Various case-control and population-based studies also showed that the increased use of masks in a community reduced the spread of SARS-CoV-2, although there was a scarcity of evidence from randomized controlled trials (RCTs). Masks varied in their effectiveness. Fitted N95s outperform surgical masks, while cloth masks provided marginal protection. During the public health emergency, governments widely recommended (and, in some jurisdictions, mandated) the wearing of masks. Prominent national and intergovernmental health agencies and their leaders recommended the use of masks to reduce transmission, including the WHO, American, European, and Chinese Centers for Disease Control and Prevention.

== Types of masks ==
Many federal governmental agencies recommended using face masks to avoid COVID-19 transmission. Masks with exhalation valves were not recommended because they expelled the wearer's breath outwards, and an infected wearer might transmit the virus through the valve.

Various types of masks were in general use, and each provided different levels of protection against COVID-19 transmission, as well as differing ease of use and comfort:

- Cloth face masks
- Surgical masks (medical masks)
- Certified face-covering masks (filtering respirators) such as N95, N99, and FFP masks –– which required suitable fitting in hospital settings.
- Other respirators, including elastomeric respirators, some of which may also be considered filtering masks

Other types of personal protective equipment (PPE), such as face shields and medical goggles, were used in conjunction with face masks but were not recommended as a replacement.

In 2020, shortages of facial masks led to the use of masks that were not certified and performed worse in particle filtration efficiency (PFE) tests.

=== Cloth masks ===
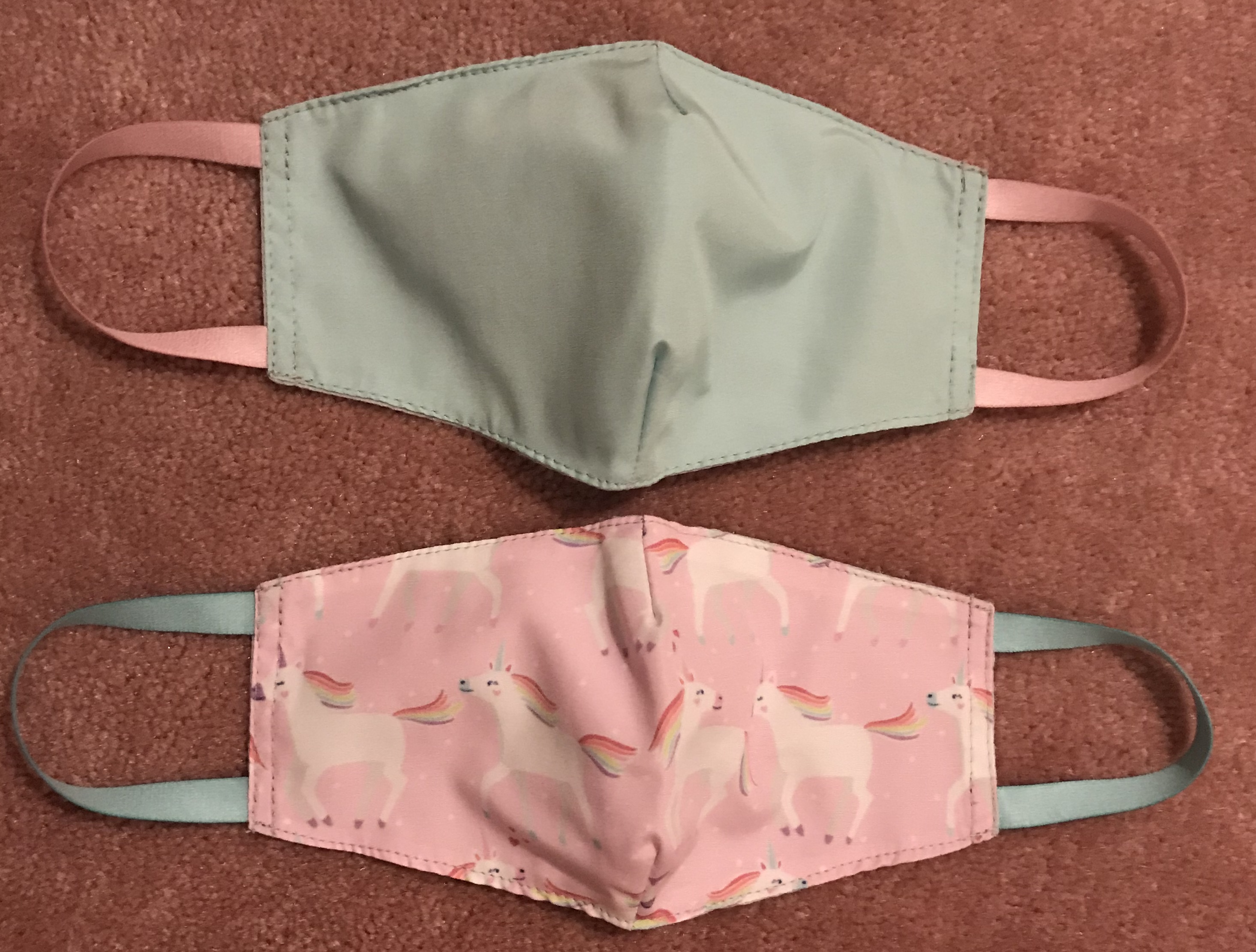
Cloth face masks

A cloth face mask is worn over the mouth and nose and is made of common textiles such as cotton. These masks vary widely in effectiveness, depending on factors like material, fit and seal, and number of layers. They are usually less effective at filtering and offer less protection than surgical masks. Unlike disposable masks, there are no required standards for cloth masks.

A study from 2020, which simulated the treatment of an artificially infected patient, found that a cloth mask was effective, but not as effective as a soft electret-filter surgical mask for protecting healthcare workers. Research on commonly available fabrics used in cloth masks found that cloth masks can provide significant protection against the transmission of particles in the aerosol size range, with enhanced performance across the nano-scale and micro-scale when masks use both mechanical and electrostatic-based filtration, but that leakage due to improper fit can degrade performance. A review of available research published in January 2021 concluded that cloth masks were considered adequate to protect healthcare practitioners in a clinical setting.

A study in 2013 had volunteers wear masks they made themselves from cotton T-shirts, following the pattern of a standard tie-behind-the-head surgical mask, and found the number of microscopic particles that leaked to the inside of the homemade masks was twice that of commercial masks. Wearing homemade masks also resulted in the leakage of a median of three times as many microorganisms as commercial masks. A 2020 study found that masks made of at least two layers of T-shirt fabric could be as protective against virus droplets as medical masks, and as breathable.

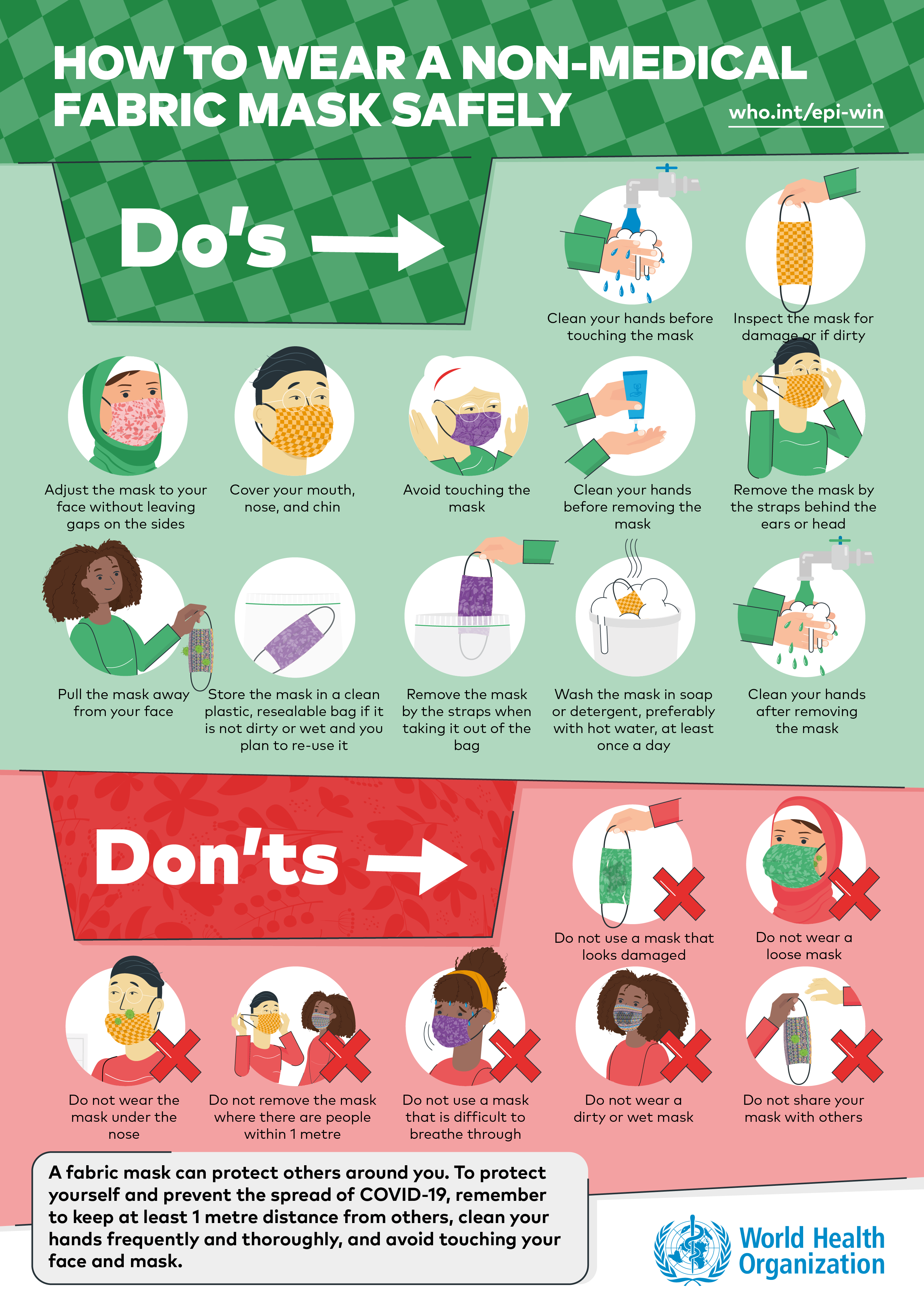
World Health Organization infographic on how to wear a non-medical fabric mask safely

A 2020 peer-reviewed summary of published literature on the filtration properties of cloth and cloth masks recommended two to four layers of plain-weave cotton or flannel of at least 100 threads per inch. However, while increasing the number of layers (3-4) improves the filtration of the material, it makes breathing through the mask more difficult.

As of May 2020, there was no research on decontaminating and reusing cloth masks. The United States Centers for Disease Control and Prevention (CDC) recommended removing a mask by handling only the ear loops or ties, placing it directly in a washing machine, and immediately washing hands in soap and water for at least twenty seconds. Cold water is considered as effective as warm water for decontamination. The CDC also recommended washing hands before putting on the mask and again immediately after touching it.

There was no information on reusing an inter-layer filter. Disposing of filters after a single use was desirable. A narrative review of the literature on the filtration properties of cloth and other household materials did not find support for using a filter. A layer of cloth, if tolerated, was suggested instead, or a PM2.5 filter, as a third layer.

The United States Environmental Protection Agency (EPA) study published on 5 April 2021 showed extremely varied performance across cotton masks. The results of the EPA study found that "a three-layer knitted cotton mask blocked an average of 26.5 percent of particles in the chamber, while a washed, two-layer woven nylon mask with a filter insert and metal nose bridge blocked 79 percent of particles on average." Ultimately, the researchers found that fabric and fit are the two most vital factors when recommending masks to the public, and further research was being conducted on variables affecting mask fit such as facial hair and face shape.

=== Surgical masks ===
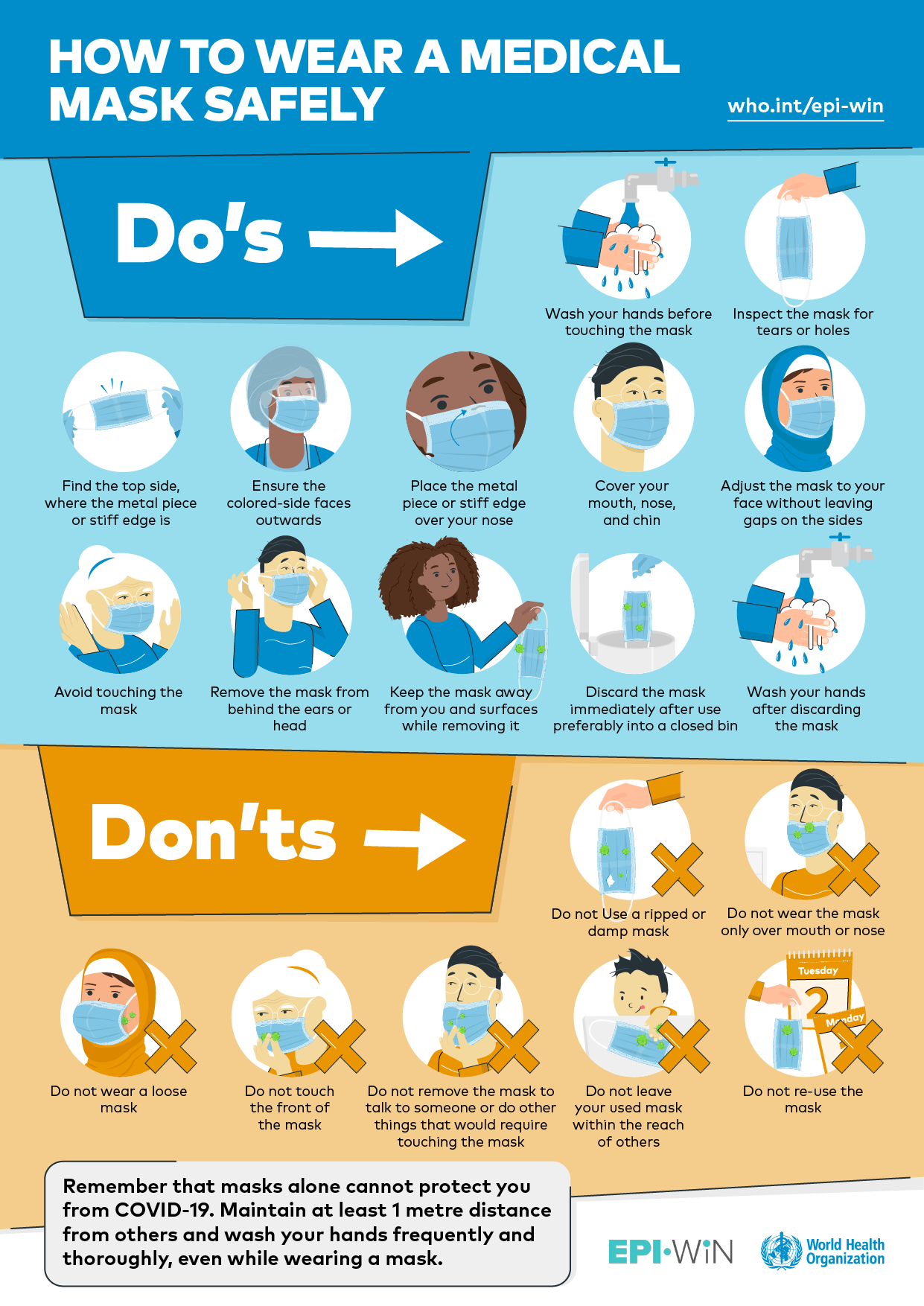
World Health Organization infographic on how to wear a medical mask safely

A surgical mask is a loose-fitting, disposable mask that creates a physical barrier separating the mouth and nose of the wearer from potential contaminants in the immediate environment. If worn properly, a surgical mask is meant to help block large-particle droplets, splashes, sprays, or splatter that may contain viruses and bacteria, keeping them from reaching the wearer's mouth and nose. Surgical masks may also help reduce others' exposure to the wearer's saliva and respiratory secretions.

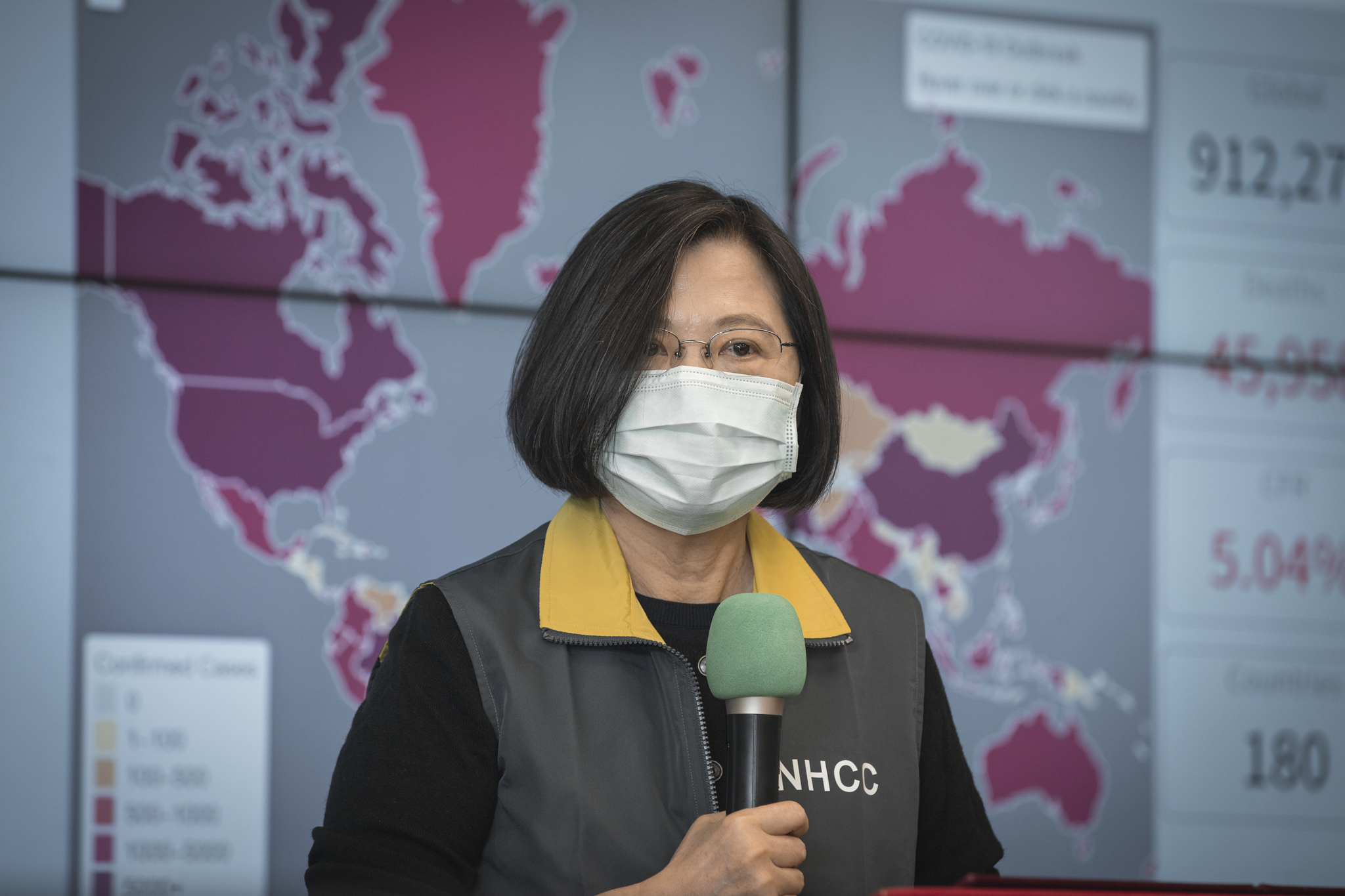
Taiwanese president Tsai Ing-wen wearing a surgical mask

Certified medical masks are made of non-woven material and are usually multi-layered. Filters may be made of microfibers with an electrostatic charge (electrets). An electret filter increases the chances that smaller particles will veer and hit a fiber, rather than going straight through (electrostatic capture). While there is some development work on making electret filtering materials that can be washed and reused, current commercially produced electret filters are ruined by many forms of disinfection, including washing with soap and water or alcohol, which destroys the electric charge. During the COVID-19 pandemic, public health authorities issued guidelines on how to save, disinfect and reuse electret-filter masks without damaging the filtration efficiency. Standard disposable surgical masks are not designed to be washed. Surgical masks may be labeled as surgical, isolation, dental, or medical procedure masks. The material that surgical masks are made from is worse at filtering very small particles (in the range of a tenth of a micrometer to a micrometer across) than that of filtering respirators (for example N95, FFP2), and the fit is worse. Surgical masks are made of a non-woven fabric created using a melt blowing process. Randomized controlled studies of respiratory infections like influenza find little difference in protection between surgical masks and filtering respirators. However, the filtering performance of correctly worn N95-type or FFP2-type filtering respirators have been shown to be superior to surgical or cloth masks. For preventing the transmission of influenza, work by the UK Health and Safety Executive found that live viruses penetrated all surgical masks tested, but properly fitted respirators reduced the viral dose by a factor of at least one hundred.

Surgical masks made to different standards in different regions of the world vary in the ranges of particles they filter. For example, the People's Republic of China regulates two types of such masks: single-use medical masks (Chinese standard YY/T 0969) and surgical masks (YY 0469). The latter masks are required to filter bacteria-sized particles (BFE ≥ 95%) and some virus-sized particles (PFE ≥ 30%), while the former masks are required to only filter bacteria-sized particles.

==== Modifications ====
The effectiveness of surgical masks in limiting particle transmission is a function of material and fit. Since the start of the COVID-19 pandemic, scientists have evaluated various modifications to ear loop surgical masks aimed at improving mask efficacy by reducing or eliminating gaps between the mask and face. The CDC evaluated and recommended two such modifications to ear loop masks to minimize the transmission of SARS-CoV-2. Under regular use, the CDC found that a surgical mask worn by a coughing individual blocked 41.3% of simulated cough aerosols (0.1–7.0μm particle size) from reaching a second individual six feet away. However, by applying a knot-and-tuck technique, (Note: Knot and tuck technique: Modification to ear loop masks where the top and bottom of the ear loop string are knotted together at the mask's edges and extra material is tucked in towards the face.) 62.9% of particles were blocked. When the surgical mask was covered with a larger cloth mask, 82% of the particles were blocked. When both the source and recipient wore masks, 84% of the particles were blocked. The number increased to more than 95% when both parties either wore two masks (surgical mask with larger cloth mask) or used the knot-and-tuck technique.

Another modification was aimed at improving the comfort of the wearers. Early in the pandemic, healthcare workers were required to wear surgical masks for 12 or more hours per day. This caused the ear loops of the masks to chafe the back of their ears. Ear savers, plastic straps, and hooks that go around wearers' heads were invented to move the ear loops away from the wearer's ears. They could be made on demand by using a 3D printing process.

An improved version of the surgical mask approaches the efficacy of N95 respirators.

=== Filtering respirators ===
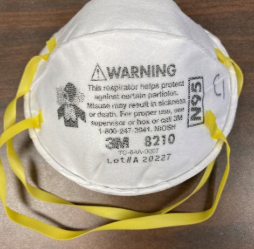
N95 mask

An N95 mask is a particulate-filtering respirator that meets the N95 air filtration rating of the United States National Institute for Occupational Safety and Health, meaning it filters at least 95% of 0.3μm airborne particles. While not resistant to oil like the P95, it is the most common particulate-filtering facepiece respirator.

The N95 mask is an example of a mechanical filter respirator, which provides protection against particulates, but not gases or vapors. Like the middle layer of surgical masks, the N95 mask is made of four layers of melt-blown, non-woven polypropylene fabric. The corresponding face mask used in the European Union is the FFP2 respirator.

Hard electret-filter masks like N95 and FFP masks must fit the face to provide full protection. Untrained users often get a reasonable fit, but fewer than one in four gets a perfect fit. Fit testing is thus standard, though debated. A line of petroleum jelly on the edge of the mask has been shown to reduce edge leakage in lab tests using mannequins that simulate breathing.

Some N95-series respirators, especially those intended for industrial use, have an exhalation valve to improve comfort, making exhalation easier and reducing leakage on exhalation and steaming up of glasses. However, those respirators are not reliable for the control of infected people (source control) in respiratory diseases like COVID-19 because infected users (asymptomatic or not) would transmit the virus to others through the valve.

During the COVID-19 pandemic, there were shortages of filtering facepiece respirators, and they had to be used for extended periods and/or disinfected and reused. At the time, public health authorities issued guidelines on how to save, disinfect and reuse masks, as some disinfection methods damaged their filtration efficiency. Some hospitals stockpiled used masks as a precaution, while others had to sanitize and reuse masks.

=== Face shields and eye protection ===
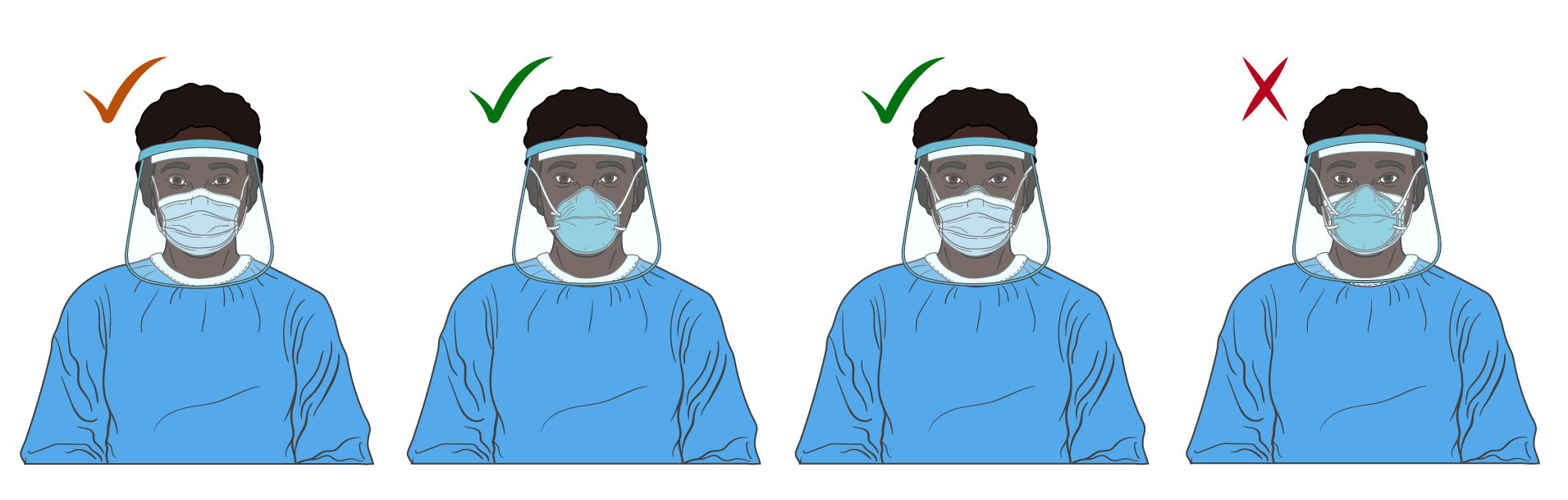
Guidelines for recommended use of face shield in conjunction with N95 respirators and medical face masks during the COVID-19 pandemic

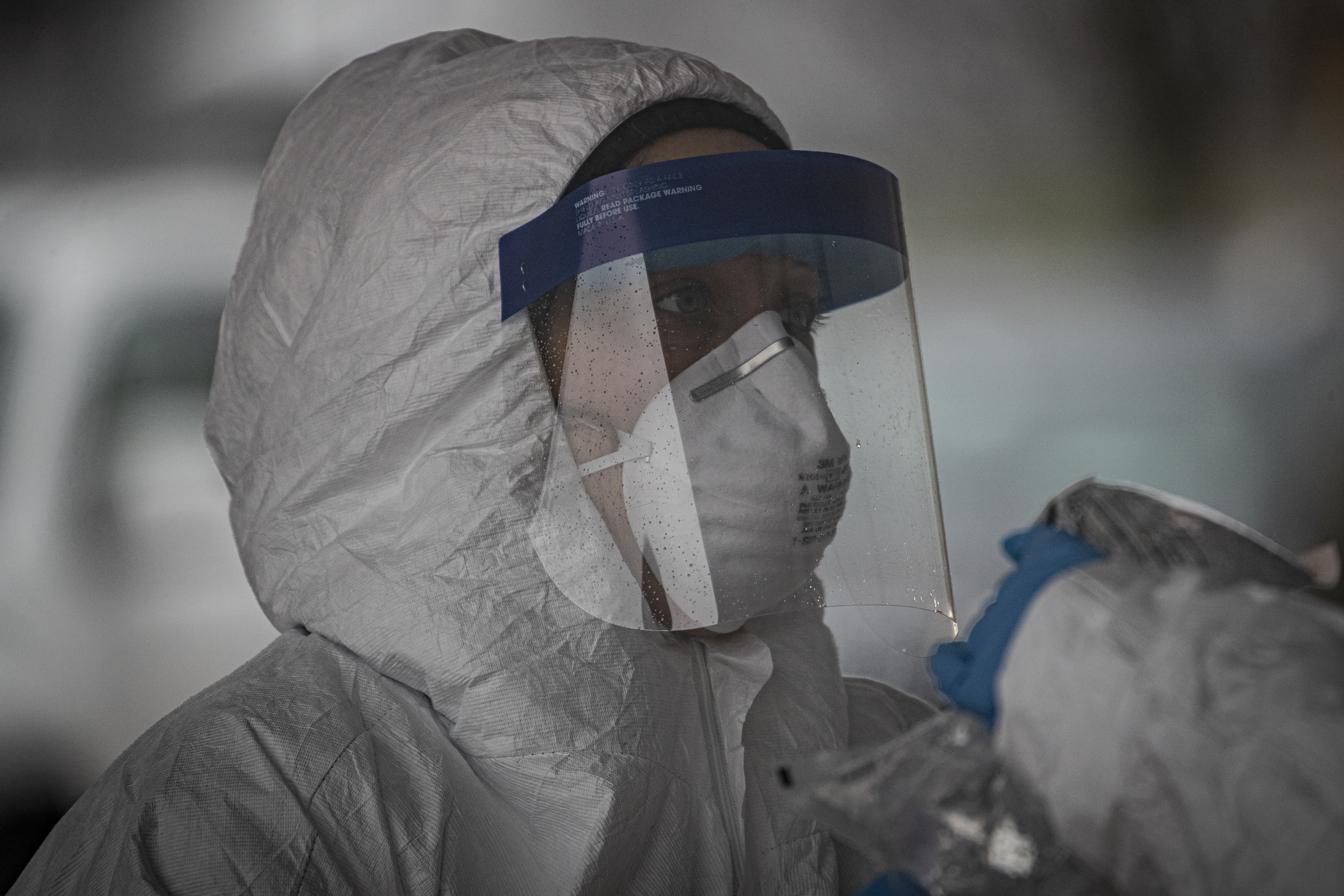
A medical worker wearing a face shield adjunct to other personal protective equipment at a COVID-19 testing site

The US Centers for Disease Control and Prevention (CDC) does not recommend the use of face shields as a substitute for masks to help slow the spread of COVID-19. In a study by Lindsley et al. (7 January 2021) funded by the National Institute for Occupational Safety and Health, face shields were found to block very few cough aerosols in contrast to face coverings such as cloth masks, procedure masks, and N95 respirators, indicating that face shields are not effective as source control devices for small respiratory aerosols and that face coverings are more effective than face shields as source control devices to reduce the community transmission of SARS-CoV-2.

In a scoping review, Godoy et al. (5 May 2020) said face shields are useful for barrier protection against splash and splatter contamination but should not be used as primary protection against respiratory disease transmission due to the lack of a peripheral seal. Instead, they should be used as an adjunct to other facial protection. The authors remarked that face shields have been used like this alongside medical-grade masks during the COVID-19 pandemic. They cited a cough simulation study by Lindsley et al. (2014) in which face shields were shown to reduce the risk of inhalation exposure by up to 95% immediately following aerosol production, but the protection was decreased with smaller aerosol particles and leakage of airborne particles around the sides of the shield.

There is only weak evidence that the use of eye protection, including face shields, is associated with lower rates of infection.

=== Elastomeric respirators ===
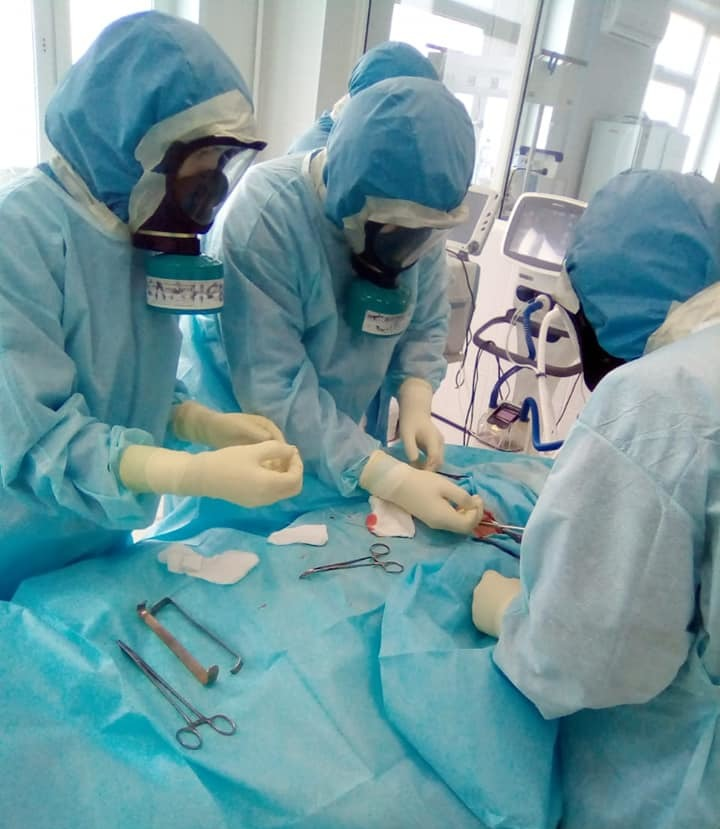
Surgeons wearing full-facepiece elastomeric respirators while doing tracheostomy to a COVID-19 patient in Russia

An elastomeric respirator is reusable personal protective equipment consisting of a tight-fitting half-facepiece or full-facepiece respirator with exchangeable filters such as cartridge filters. They provide an alternative respiratory protection option to filtering facepiece respirators such as N95 masks. Some healthcare workers have used them during supply shortages caused by the COVID-19 pandemic, as they can be reused over an extended period in healthcare settings. However, most elastomeric respirators have an unfiltered exhalation vent, which would allow the virus to spread from the wearer.

During the COVID-19 response, when supplies were limited, the US CDC said that contingency and crisis strategies should be followed: each elastomeric respirator is issued for the exclusive use of an individual healthcare provider but must be cleaned and disinfected as often as necessary to remain unspoiled and sanitary. If there is no other option than to share a respirator between healthcare providers, the respirator must be cleaned and disinfected before it is worn by a different individual. Filters (except for unprotected disc types) may be used for an extended period, but the filter housing of cartridge types must be disinfected after each patient interaction.

=== Powered air-purifying respirators ===
A powered air-purifying respirator (PAPR) is a type of personal protective equipment in which a device with a filter and fan creates a highly filtered airflow towards the headpiece and a positive outflow of air from the headpiece.

There is an increased risk for healthcare workers to become exposed to SARS-CoV-2 when they conduct aerosol-generating procedures on COVID-19 patients, which is why it is argued that such situations may require enhanced personal protective equipment (i.e., higher than N95) such as PAPRs for healthcare workers.

In a systematic review, Licina, Silvers, and Stuart (8 August 2020) said field studies indicate that there were equivalent rates of infection among healthcare workers who performed airway procedures on critically ill COVID-19 patients while the healthcare workers were using PAPRs or other appropriate respiratory equipment (such as N95 or FFP2). They remarked, though, that there is a need to further collect field data about optimal respiratory protection during highly virulent pandemics.

=== Face masks with exhalation valves ===
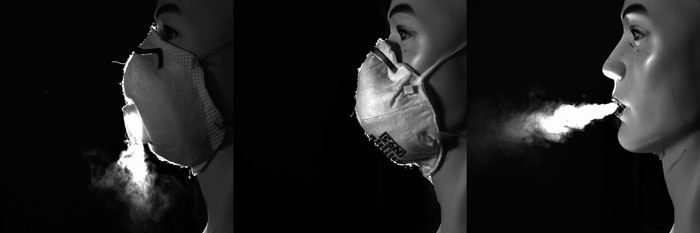
Flow visualizations comparing face mask efficacy with and without exhalation valve, illustrating the concern that exhalation valves allow exhaled respiratory droplets to reach others in proximity and would therefore not be appropriate in source control strategies

Some masks include an exhalation valve to expel the breath outwards, but that airflow is not filtered. Certification (as N95 or FFP2) is about the mask itself and does not warrant any safety about the air that is exhaled. Putting tape over the exhalation valve can make a mask or respirator as effective as one without a valve.

Scientists have visualized droplet dispersal for masks with exhalation valves and face shields and concluded that they can be ineffective against COVID-19 spread (e.g., after a cough) and recommended alternatives. A later study showed that some (but not all) respirators with exhalation valves can perform as well as a surgical mask. However, a respirator without an exhalation valve should still be preferred.

== Recommendations ==
The use of face masks or coverings by the general public was recommended by health officials to minimize the risk of transmissions, with authorities either requiring their use in certain settings, such as on public transport and in shops, or universally in public.

Health officials advised that medical-grade face masks, such as respirators, should be prioritized for use by healthcare workers in view of critical shortages. As such, they generally recommend cloth masks for the general public. However, recommendations changed as the body of scientific knowledge evolved. Scientists recommend having a triple-layered surgical mask or a respirator.

According to #Masks4All, in September 2020, approximately 95% of the world population lived in a country where the government and leading disease experts recommend or require the use of masks in public places to limit the spread of COVID-19.

=== World Health Organization ===
A video from the World Health Organization regarding different types of face masks and how to use them

Early in 2020, the WHO had only recommended medical masks for people with suspected infection and respiratory symptoms, their caregivers, those sharing their living space, and healthcare workers. In April 2020, the WHO acknowledged that wearing a medical mask could limit the spread of certain respiratory viral diseases including COVID-19 but claimed that medical masks would create a false sense of security and potentially lead to neglect of other necessary measures, such as hand hygiene.

The early WHO advice on limited mask usage was scrutinized for several reasons. First, experts and researchers pointed out the asymptomatic transmission of the virus. Second, according to Marteau et al. (27 July 2020), available evidence does not support the notion that masking adversely affects hand hygiene: Dame Theresa Marteau, one of the researchers, remarked that the concept of risk compensation, rather than risk compensation itself, seems the greater threat to public health through delaying potentially effective interventions that can help prevent the spread of disease.

The WHO revised its mask guidance in June 2020, with its officials acknowledging that studies indicated asymptomatic or pre-symptomatic spread. The updated advice recommended that the general public should wear non-medical fabric masks where there is known or suspected widespread transmission and where physical distancing is not possible, and that vulnerable people (60 and over, or with underlying health risks) and people with any symptoms suggestive of COVID-19 as well as caregivers and healthcare workers should wear surgical or procedure masks. They stated that the purpose of mask usage was to prevent the wearer transmitting the virus to others (source control) and to offer protection to healthy wearers against infection (prevention).

The WHO advised that non-medical fabric masks should have a minimum of three layers, suggesting an inner layer made of absorbent material (such as cotton), a middle layer made of non-woven material (such as polypropylene) which may enhance filtration or retain droplets, and an outer layer made of non-absorbent material (such as polyester or its blends), as it may limit external contamination from penetration.

On 21 August 2020, the WHO and UNICEF released an annex guidance for children. For children five and younger, they advised that masks should not be required in consideration of a child's developmental milestones, compliance challenges, and autonomy required to use a mask properly, but recognized that the evidence supporting their cut-off age is limited and countries may hold a different age of cut-off. For children 6–11, they advised that mask usage should be decided in consideration of several factors including the intensity of local viral transmission, (the latest evidence about) the risk of infection for the age group, the social and cultural environment (which influences social interactions in communities and populations), the capacity to comply with appropriate mask usage, the availability of appropriate adult supervision, and the potential impact on learning and psychosocial development, as well as additional factors involving specific settings or circumstances (such as disabilities, underlying diseases, elderly people, sport activities, and schools). For children 12 and older, they advised that masks should be worn under the same conditions for adults in accordance with WHO guidance or national guidelines.

Regarding the use of non-medical fabric masks in the general population, the WHO had stated that high-quality evidence for its widespread use was limited, but advised governments to encourage its use as physical distancing may not be possible in some settings. There was some evidence for asymptomatic transmission, and masks could be helpful to provide a barrier to limit the spread of potentially infectious droplets.

=== United States Centers for Disease Control and Prevention ===
Guidance from the US Centers for Disease Control and Prevention on using and making cloth masks during the COVID-19 pandemic

Early in 2020, the United States Centers for Disease Control and Prevention (CDC) said it did not recommend the use of face masks for the general public. However, on 3 April 2020, the CDC changed its advice to recommend that people wear cloth face coverings "in public settings when around people outside their household, especially when social distancing measures are difficult to maintain". In response to a media inquiry by National Public Radio, the CDC said that this change in guidelines was due to the increasing and widespread transmission of the virus, citing studies published in February and March showing pre-symptomatic and asymptomatic transmission. In a subsequent interview and JAMA editorial, the CDC director Robert R. Redfield explained that the CDC's early guidance had been premised on an initial absence of evidence of disease transmission from pre- and asymptomatic individuals.

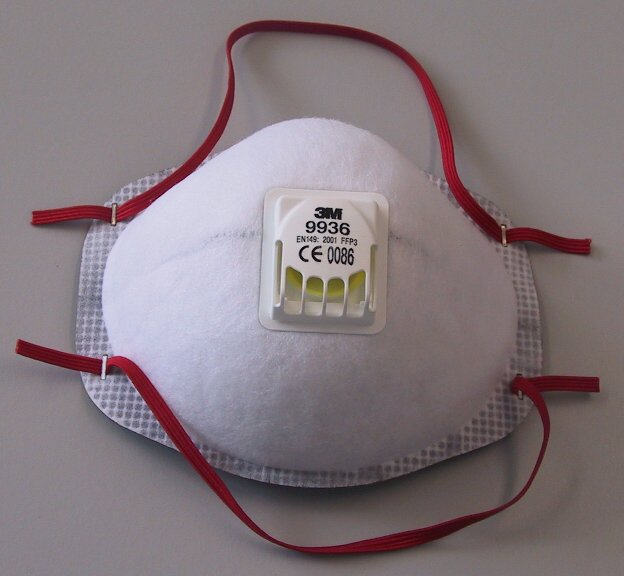
The CDC does not recommend masks with exhalation valves or vents for source control. In the healthcare workers' guidance, if only respirators with valves are available and source control is needed, the CDC recommends that the valve should be covered with a surgical mask, procedure mask, or cloth face covering.

On 28 June, the CDC stated the "CDC recommends that people wear cloth face coverings in public settings and when around people who don't live in your household, especially when other social distancing measures are difficult to maintain. Cloth face coverings may help prevent people who have COVID-19 from spreading the virus to others. Cloth face coverings are most likely to reduce the spread of COVID-19 when they are widely used by people in public settings." The CDC provided the caveat that cloth face coverings should not be worn by children under the age of two, people who have trouble breathing, or people who are unconscious, incapacitated, or otherwise unable to remove the mask without assistance. In August 2020, the CDC added that exhalation valves or vents in masks do not help prevent the person wearing the mask from spreading COVID-19 to others.

In a November 2020 scientific brief, the CDC reiterated their recommendation for the community use of masks and specifically non-valved multi-layer cloth masks to prevent transmission of SARS-CoV-2. The CDC stated that the community's use of masks serves two primary purposes: to reduce the emission of virus-laden droplets from exhalation into the environment (source control), which is especially relevant for asymptomatic or pre-symptomatic infected wearers who feel well and may be unaware of their infectiousness to others, and to reduce inhalation of these droplets through filtration for the wearer (personal protection). For filtration, the CDC says some fabrics (such as silk) may hydrophobically repel moist droplets, whereas other fabrics (such as polyester or polypropylene) may electrostatically capture droplets. They concluded that the benefit of masking for SARS-CoV-2 control is derived from the combination of source control and personal protection, which is likely complementary and possibly synergistic so that individual benefit increases with increasing community mask use.

The CDC said healthcare personnel should wear a NIOSH-approved N95 (or equivalent or higher-level) respirator or a face mask (if a respirator is not available) with a face shield or goggles as part of their personal protective equipment, while patients with suspected or confirmed SARS-CoV-2 infection should wear a face mask or cloth face covering during transport. As crisis strategy for known shortages of N95 respirators in healthcare settings during the COVID epidemic, among other sequential measures, the CDC suggests use of respirators beyond the manufacturer-designated shelf life, use of respirators approved under standards used in other countries that are similar to NIOSH-approved respirators, limited re-use of respirators, use of additional respirators beyond the manufacturer-designated shelf life that have not been evaluated by NIOSH, and prioritizing the use of respirators and face masks by activity type.

In late July 2021, the CDC changed guidelines to recommend people, including those who are vaccinated, to continue masking in public indoor settings in areas with substantial and high transmission—as there are indications that the coronavirus such as the Delta variant may infect even vaccinated people in rare occasions—to help prevent transmission to other people. Previously, the CDC updated public guidance from May 2021 stated that those who are fully vaccinated can "resume activities without wearing masks or physically distancing, except where required by federal, state, local, tribal, or territorial laws, rules and regulations, including local business and workplace guidance." However, critics posited that it was predicated on a key social factor, namely whether people can be trusted to wear a mask if they are not fully vaccinated.

On 25 February 2022, the CDC changed its guidelines to suggest that 70% of Americans no longer need to wear masks, social distance or avoid crowded spaces. Under the new guidance, Americans in counties designated as medium-to-low risk can go indoors without masks. In accordance with these new CDC guidelines, a number of US states ended their mask mandates for indoor spaces. However, federal officials emphasized that regardless of local conditions, individuals with COVID-19 or COVID-19 symptoms, as well as individuals who consider themselves to be high-risk, should continue to wear facial coverings. In addition to this, the CDC dropped its recommendation for universal school mask mandates. These new recommendations assessed COVID-19 hospitalizations as well as the proportion of beds occupied by COVID-19 patients in certain areas.

==== Criticism of guidance ====
Larry Gostin, a professor of public health law, said initial CDC and WHO guidance had given the public the wrong impression that masks did not work, even though scientific evidence to the contrary was already available. The confusing changing advice from discouraging to recommending public masking had led to decreasing public trust in the CDC. In June 2020, Anthony Fauci, a leading infectious disease expert for the United States government, stated that the delay in recommending general mask use was motivated by a desire to conserve dwindling supplies for medical professionals. Since September 2021, the director of the CDC, Rochelle Walensky, indicated that the schools that did not have mask mandates were 3.5 times as likely to experience COVID outbreaks as the ones that did. This statement caused controversy because it was based on an outlier study criticized by some experts as unreliable to learn about the effects of mask mandates.

=== China ===
In March 2020, when asked about the mistakes that other countries were making during the pandemic, the Chinese Center for Disease Control and Prevention director-general George Fu Gao said:

The big mistake in the U.S. and Europe, in my opinion, is that people aren't wearing masks. This virus is transmitted by droplets and close contact. Droplets play a very important role – you've got to wear a mask because when you speak, there are always droplets coming out of your mouth. Many people have asymptomatic or pre-symptomatic infections. If they are wearing face masks, it can prevent droplets that carry the virus from escaping and infecting others.

=== Europe ===
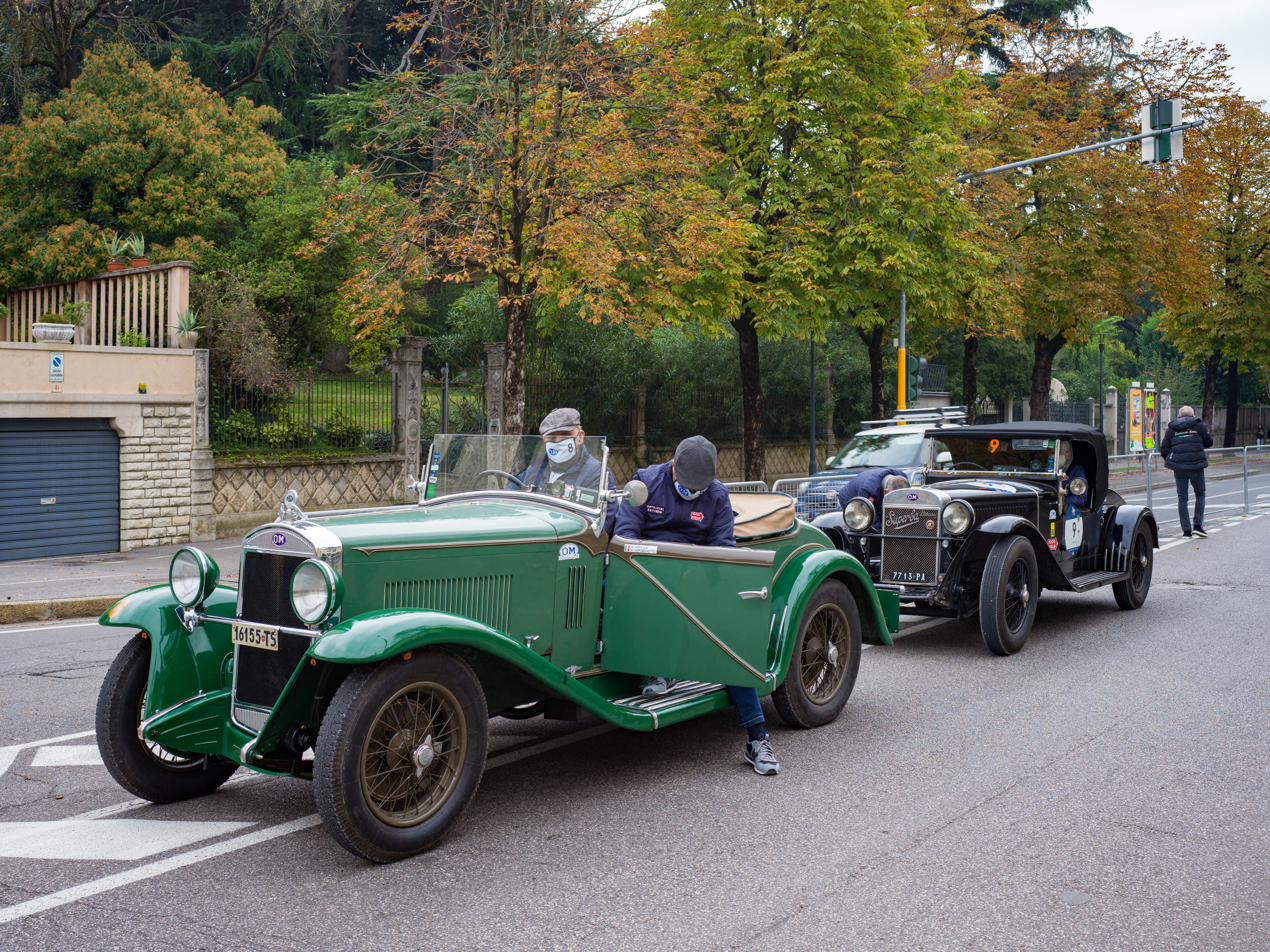
Masked participants in the 2020 edition of the Mille Miglia road race in Brescia, Italy

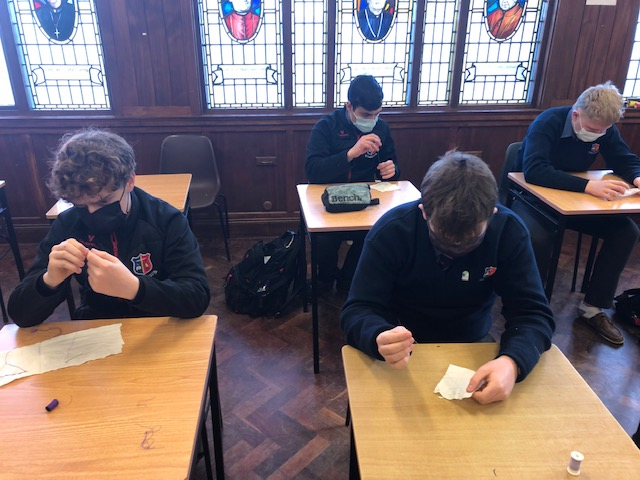
Boys of St Munchin's College in Ireland wearing face masks in class during the pandemic

The majority of countries in Europe introduced mandatory face mask rules for public places. On 8 April 2020, the European Centre for Disease Prevention and Control (ECDC) published its masking recommendations, saying that the "use of face masks in the community could be considered, especially when visiting busy, closed spaces". On 15 February 2021, the ECDC updated the recommendation, stating, "Although the evidence for the use of medical face masks in the community to prevent COVID-19 is limited, face masks should be considered as a non-pharmaceutical intervention in combination with other measures as part of efforts to control the COVID-19 pandemic."

The Nordic countries and the Netherlands were notable exceptions in supporting the use of face masks, but eventually started to recommend masks. For example, due to the COVID-19 pandemic in the Netherlands, wearing a mouth/nose mask was made mandatory on public transportation per 1 June 2020. The main reasoning against masks recommendations given by officials in the Nordic countries was that public masking is deemed an unnecessary precaution when infection levels remain low. In June 2020, the Norwegian Institute of Public Health said asymptomatic individuals wearing face masks were not to be recommended due to the low prevalence of COVID-19 in the country but noted that it should be reconsidered if cases rise. Similarly, on 30 July 2020, the Danish Health Authority director Søren Brostrøm said face covers did not make sense in the current situation with low infection levels, but that they needed to evaluate whether it could make sense in the long term.

Sweden was notable as a country where face masks were not recommended to the general public and the State Epidemiologist of Sweden, Anders Tegnell, was an opponent of face masks among the general population, although he stated that face masks might be suitable in workplaces where people are one to two meters from each other for more than fifteen minutes, something which some Swedish and foreign media have interpreted as a recommendation. This position was slightly reversed when Prime Minister of Sweden, Stefan Löfven, announced that they were recommending face masks on 18 December 2020. The Public Health Agency of Sweden later clarified on their website that the recommendation would include citizens born before 2004 to wear masks during rush hour on public transportation throughout the country from 7 January 2021 onward. On 20 December 2020, two days after the announcement was made, Prime Minister Löfven was paparazzied in a shopping mall in central Stockholm without wearing a face mask. By 22 January 2021, the Stockholm Public Transport estimated that about half of all passengers on trains and buses wore face masks during rush hour. Among those who chose not to follow the recommendation were Johan Carlson, the Director-General of the Public Health Agency, and Anders Tegnell, the state epidemiologist.

== Rationale ==
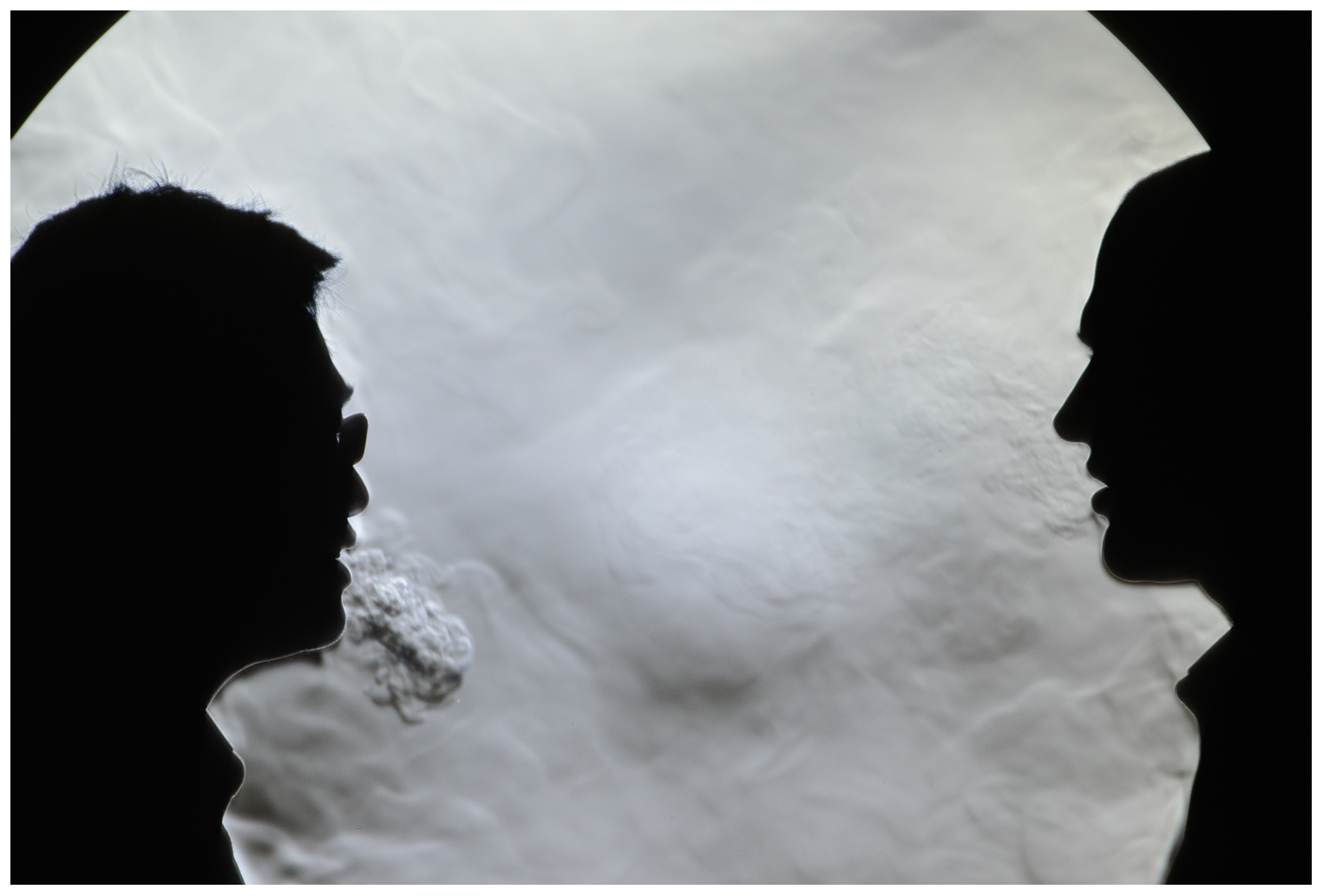
Schlieren image showing the interaction of exhaled airflows between two people

Masks are used to limit the transmission of SARS-CoV-2 from respiratory droplets and aerosols, which are thought to be the major pathways of infection, exhaled from infected individuals during breathing, speaking, coughing, and sneezing. Properly worn masks are effective in both limiting the spread of the virus by an infected individual and protecting an uninfected individual from infection.

The National Health Commission of China cited the following reasons for the wearing of masks by the public, including healthy individuals:

1. Asymptomatic transmission. Many people can be infected without symptoms or only with mild symptoms.
2. Difficulty or impossibility of appropriate social distancing in many public places at all times.
3. Cost-benefit mismatch. If only infected individuals wear masks, they would have a negative incentive to do so. An infected individual might get nothing positive, but only bear the costs such as inconvenience, purchasing expenses, and even prejudice.
4. There is no shortage of masks in China. The country has the production capacity to meet the demand for masks.

=== Source control ===
In a comment to The Lancet, Kar Keung Cheng, Tai Hing Lam, and Chi Chiu Leung argued that a public health rationale for mass masking is source control to protect others from respiratory droplets. They discussed the importance of this approach due to asymptomatic transmission. Wang Linfa, an infectious disease expert who heads a joint Duke University and National University of Singapore research team, said masking is about "preventing the spread of disease rather than preventing getting the disease", remarking that the point is to cover the faces of people who are infected but do not know it, so it is imperative for everyone to wear one in public. The US CDC also highlighted the use of masks for source control, pointing out that asymptomatic and pre-symptomatic cases are estimated to account for over 50% of the transmissions.

=== Respiratory tract ===
Monica Gandhi, a medical professor at the University of California, San Francisco, says viral shedding at high quantities from the upper respiratory tract, characterized by unusually high levels of viral particles, means universal mask wearing is one of the best ways to limit the asymptomatic spread of the virus. Yixuan Hou et al. (July 2020) found that the nasal cavity is the dominant initial site for SARS-CoV-2 infection with subsequent aspiration-mediated virus seeding into the lungs; the authors note that these findings argue for the widespread use of masks to prevent exposure to the nasal passages.

=== Severity ===
Monica Gandhi, Chris Beyrer, and Eric Goosby posit that masking reduces the dose of the virus for the wearer and thus helps lower the severity of infection. They highlighted that the proportion of asymptomatic and mild infection compared to severe infection increased in settings of the adoption of population-level masking. One example involved a comparison of outbreaks on cruise ships: the Diamond Princess had 18% asymptomatic cases among all the infected people, but this was 81% in the Greg Mortimer where masks were given to passengers and staff members.

=== Precautionary ===
Trisha Greenhalgh et al. argue for the precautionary principle as a reason to adopt policies encouraging the wearing of face masks in public, given that there's much to gain and little to lose from adopting masks considering the seriousness of the outbreak. Others agreed, based on the evidence-based principle that the likely benefits outweighed the likely harms.

=== Distancing ===
Leonardo Setti et al. argue that face masks should be used to complement social distancing of six feet or two meters, because this inter-personal distance is more effective if people are masked as studies indicate that SARS-CoV-2 could be transmitted over greater distances. Chi Chiu Leung et al. also argue that face masks complement social distancing, as a high degree of compliance for distancing is necessary to achieve the greatest impact but is not always achievable. For instance, even if social distancing is rigorously practiced, there are necessary person-to-person contacts (such as going to the supermarket and other necessary activities to sustain livelihoods), so masks would help in situations when social distancing is not feasible and maximize the effectiveness of social distancing.

=== Touching ===
According to Stephen Griffin, a virologist at the University of Leeds, "Wearing a mask can reduce the propensity for people to touch their faces, which is a major source of infection without proper hand hygiene." Ka Hung Chan and Kwok-Yung Yuen argue that face masks can reduce fomite transmission (in addition to the transmission through droplets or aerosol) of the virus, as masks can prevent people from spreading body fluids by touching their noses or mouths (such as trying to cover up a sneeze or cough).

A paper by Miyu Moriyama et al. (September 2020), which linked the seasonality of respiratory viral diseases to decreased air humidity due to indoor heating, argued that mask-wearing helps limit respiratory virus transmission in winter because masks keep the nose warm and moist.

Social media claims that masks could reduce the oxygen levels in older people were refuted by a small study of SpO_{2} levels, the results of which were published by JAMA.

== Efficacy ==
=== Overall ===
Observational studies, randomized controlled trials (RCTs), and mask filtration testing were used to evaluate the effectiveness of masks. Most of the evidence for the efficacy of masks against COVID comes from observational studies. One paper did not consider RCTs a "gold standard" of evidence, since most effective public health policies had never been evaluated through an RCT, but that, overall, there was "robust data" to support the use of face masks to reduce community transmission of COVID. Another review said that non-RCT evidence cannot be ignored. As of August 2023, RCTs played a relatively small role in the evaluation of non-pharmaceutical interventions during the pandemic.

A 2023 systematic review from the Cochrane Collaboration said the evidence from randomized controlled trials was still inconclusive over whether masking prevented the spread of influenza/COVID‐like illness through a population, noting that the answer could be different for different viruses. This Cochrane review was criticized for combining studies about influenza and about COVID, which could "yield invalid conclusions". Another 2023 systematic review, by the Royal Society, found the evidence from RCTs was that masks reduced risk by 12% to 18%.

A 2022 systematic review and meta-analysis of randomized controlled trials on face mask use in PLOS One showed that with 95% confidence, masks reduced respiratory infection incidence by between 3% and 19% in a community setting. A 2023 article in JAMA Network Open found that "robust data" support the use of face masks to reduce community transmission of COVID. A 2023 review in Archives of Disease in Childhood on mask wearing by children found no good clinical evidence that mask wearing was of benefit for them in preventing COVID-19 transmission or infection.

A systematic review and meta-analysis of the effectiveness of masks published in The BMJ in November 2021 showed that with 95% confidence, masks reduced COVID incidence by between 25% and 71%. This result is based on six primary studies. These studies were of several different types: case-control studies in Thailand and three Western countries (where cases identified whether they were wearing a mask when they had contact with a known positive patient), a randomized control study in Denmark which assessed the impact on mask-wearing on the wearer, a natural experiment that compared US states that implemented mask mandates on the level of COVID, a cross-sectional comparative study in China which surveyed whether a mask protected the wearer, and a retrospective cohort study in China which assessed the impact of masks worn by infected and uninfected family members. Another five studies were not included because they were not directly comparable. They assessed the impact of mask mandates across countries on mortality (finding a 45.7% reduction), of mask mandates in the US on R (finding a 29% reduction), a comparative incidence of COVID associated with mask-wearing comparing HK and South Korea (finding a significant reduction), a natural experiment across US states finding a significant effect on case rates, and a cross-sectional study assessing a 10% increase in mask wearing led to a 71% reduction in the risk to others. A lot of other papers had to be rejected because of the risk of confounding influences. Other reviews in 2020 and 2021 found that there is consistent evidence that mask-wearing is effective in reducing the spread of the SARS-CoV-2 virus and that population-wide masking proved significant in reducing the transmission of COVID-19.

Masks are not of equal efficacy. While N95 masks outperform surgical masks in filtration, healthcare worker population studies have not shown a significant difference between the two, as of June 2021. A later study performed in 2024, however, criticized the methodology of such studies due to substantial healthcare worker compliance problems.

N95 and surgical masks, both designed for single use, can be decontaminated at a loss to mask integrity and filtration efficacy. Both N95 and surgical outperform cloth masks, which the general public has used based on their greater availability during mask supply shortages. Cloth and fabric masks have protected wearers from COVID-19, with some variability, such as fabric type, layer count, and mask fit. Several observational studies, including four reviewed in a 2020 Lancet meta-analysis, have found that masks offer statistically significant protection from infection, although the level of protection varies according to the mask type and setting.

Evaluation of cloth mask efficacy is further complicated by the wide variation in fabric and fit, among other factors. Concerning the precedent of mask efficacy in limiting transmission of respiratory viral illnesses other than COVID, a clinical trial meta-analysis in May 2021 showed no significant evidence of efficacy, though the authors noted the evidence to be poor quality and subject to confounding factors like consistent mask usage adherence.

Protection efficiency can also be evaluated by generated aerosol. In a paper evaluating the efficacy of various N95, surgical and cloth masks, the tested N95 respirator (a 3M 8210) performed the best in filtration in both inhalation and exhalation, while the surgical (from BYD Care) and cloth masks (Forever Family and Maskfit Proshield) performed similarly in filtration, with cloth masks performing worse than surgical masks in SPS30 readings, and double-masking providing little benefit. The tested N95, when not fitted, performed as well as a surgical or cloth mask, depending on the exercise.

=== Cloth masks ===
Community studies have shown some cloth masks to be effective at filtering respiratory droplets, which can carry SARS-CoV-2. Cloth masks of a cotton quilt (120 thread per inch), bonded copy paper, flannel, and a chiffon or silk hybrid with cotton are over 90% effective at blocking particles the size droplets that carry SARS-CoV-2, according to an October 2021 review of 42 studies. Multilayered fabrics provided improved breathability and filtration efficacy. Among readily available fabrics, two-layered 100% cotton, two-layered cotton quilt, hybrid masks, and cotton flannel performed best. Filtration effectiveness generally improves with thread count.

The use of a face mask can result in significant risk reduction of infection with epidemic-causative beta coronaviruses. N95 or similar respirators account for a larger risk reduction than disposable surgical or other similar masks. Masks are protective for both healthcare workers and people in communities exposed to infection; evidence supports masking in both healthcare and non-healthcare settings, with no striking differences detected in the effectiveness of masks between the settings.

The CDC highlighted a number of studies in their 10 November 2020, scientific brief detailing the benefits of community masking. In a study of 124 Beijing households with at least one laboratory-confirmed case of SARS-CoV-2 infection, mask use by the index patient and family contacts before the index patient developed symptoms reduced secondary transmission within the households by 79%. A retrospective case-control study from Thailand documented that, among more than 1,000 people interviewed as part of contact tracing investigations, those who reported having always worn a mask during high-risk exposures experienced a greater than 70% reduced risk of acquiring infection compared with people who did not wear masks under these circumstances. A similar study in three Western countries also came up with a 70% risk reduction. Investigations involving infected passengers aboard flights longer than ten hours strongly suggest that masking prevented in-flight transmissions, as demonstrated by the absence of infection developing in other passengers and crew in the 14 days following exposure. In addition, the CDC said the benefit of universal masking, including reductions in infections and mortality, has been demonstrated in community-level analyses by a set of studies involving the Massachusetts hospital system, the German city Jena, the American state Arizona, a panel of 15 American states and Washington, D.C., Canada nationally, and the United States nationally.

In addition to studying the impact of mask-wearing on transmission in a community, direct studies can be done on whether a mask filters out virus-carrying particles from the air. In August 2021, a study of the fabric of masks worn in the community found that they filtered out between half and three-quarters of the viral RNA. Respirators made to a standard such as N95 or FFP2 when properly fitted should filter out at least 95% of the virus.

=== Optimal face mask designs and use ===
A scientific review of research about the overall efficacy of face masks in terms of product design (such as thermal comfort and flow resistance) and ways of usage found that fluid dynamics and fabrication techniques have a significant impact on performance. According to the review, studies showed that cotton and surgical masks had a microorganism filtration efficiency of 86.4% and 99.9% respectively, while the surgical mask was three times more effective in blocking transmission than the cotton mask and could lead to a decrease of the effective reproduction number to below 1 – which could halt epidemic spread in a region where 70% of residents use them consistently in public.

By January 2021, several lines of research recommended double-masking (wearing a cloth mask over a surgical mask, along with using a mask filter, or wearing a nylon covering over a mask) as being efficacious.

== Correct handling and wearing of masks ==
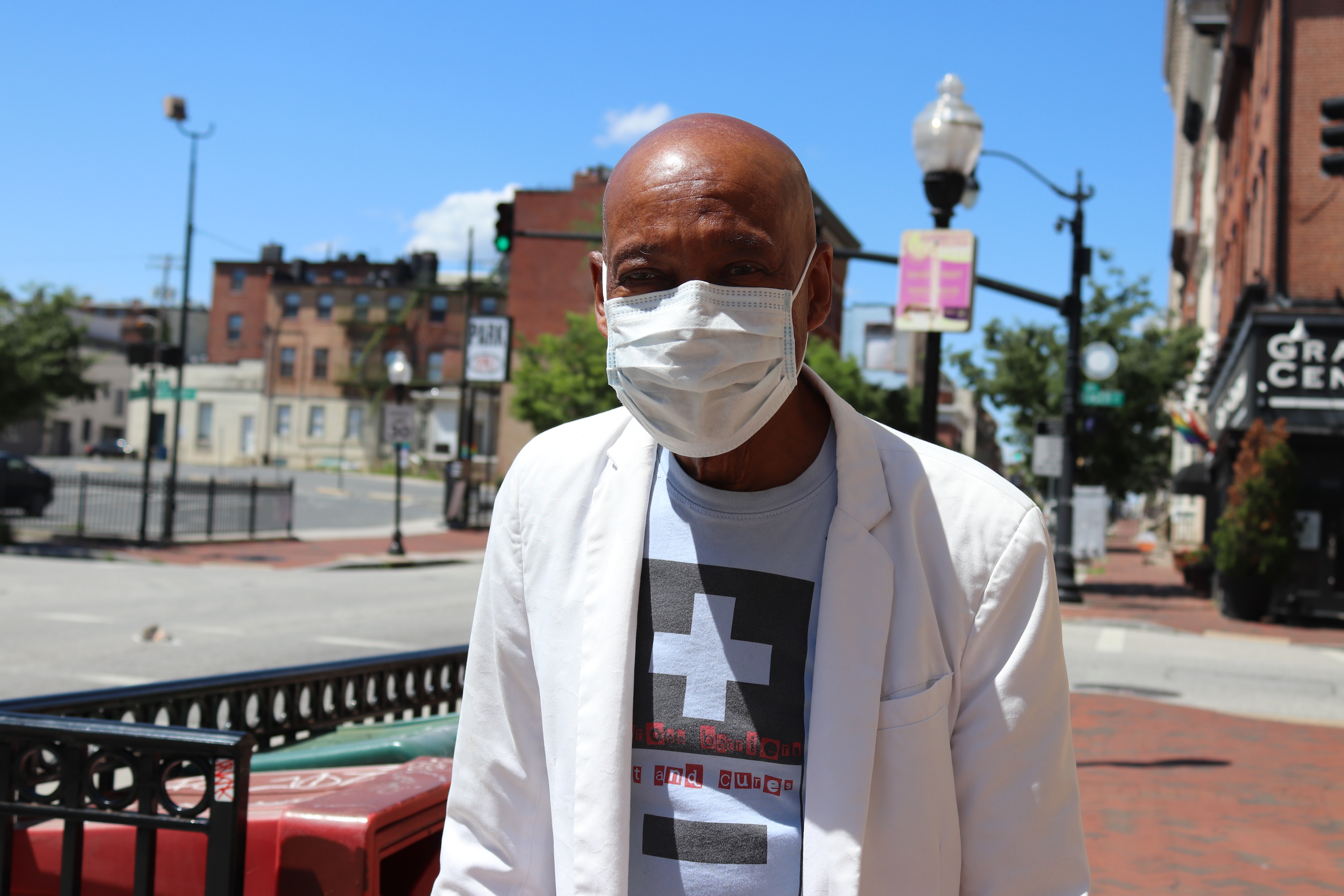
A properly-worn face mask or covering covers the nose, mouth, and chin

As masking became widespread during the pandemic, it gave rise to the issue that many individuals of the public are not correctly handling and wearing their masks. Suzanne Willard, a clinical professor at Rutgers School of Nursing, remarked that the general public is not used to wearing masks and lay people are asked to use a tool health care professionals are trained to use.

A commonly seen issue is that people are wearing masks pulled down below the nose, which is an incorrect way to wear a mask. Zane Saul, the chief of infectious disease at Bridgeport Hospital, remarked that "I really have observed people not covering their noses and just covering their mouths. It's just as important to cover your nose." Daniel Gottschall, the vice president of medical affairs for the Fairfield region of Hartford HealthCare and St. Vincent's Medical Center in Bridgeport, explained that "By wearing a mask you're keeping a lot of those secretions inside of you. If you wear it just over your nose or just over your mouth and you're not diligent (about keeping it in place), you're exposing the secretions that come out of that part of the body to other people."

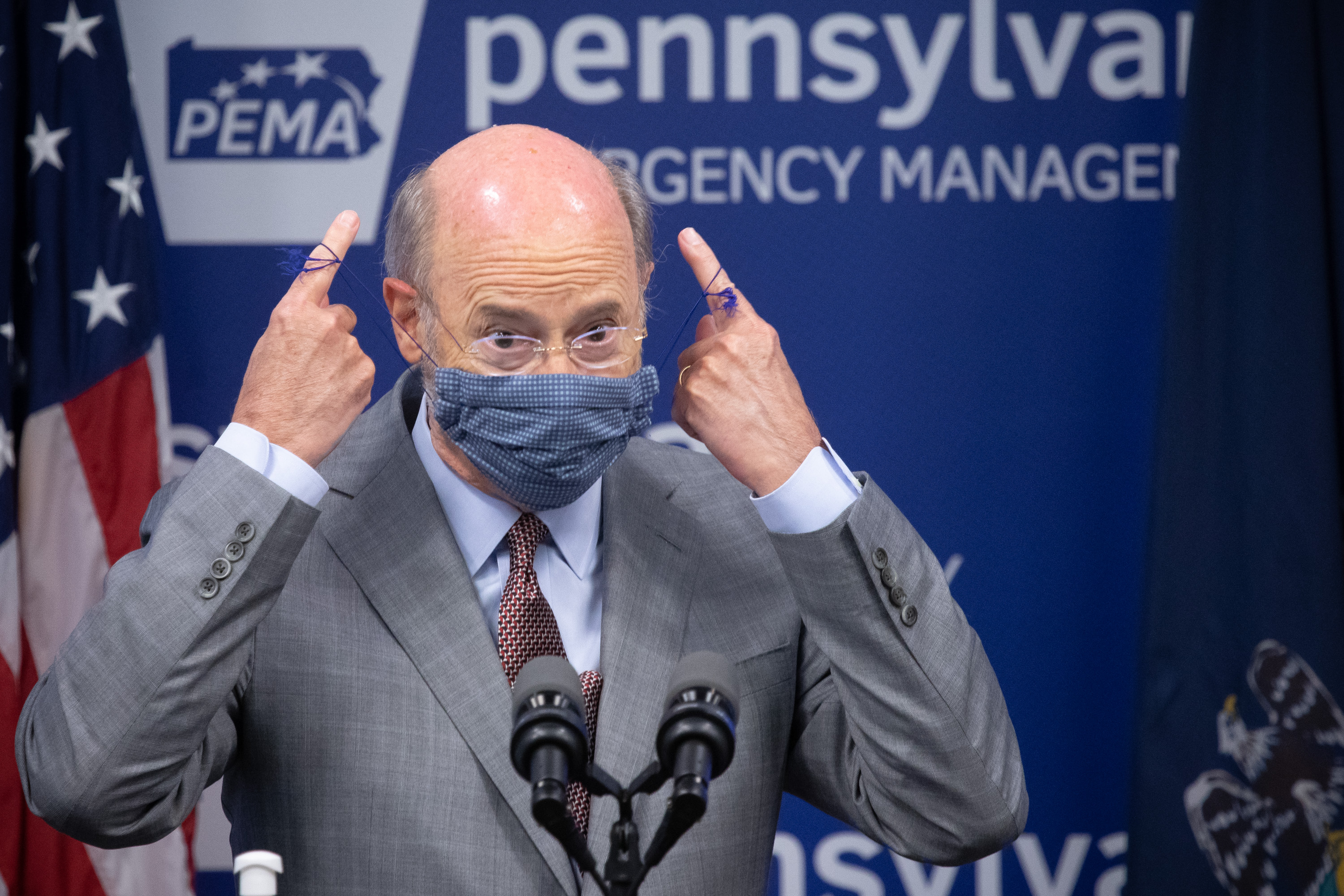
A face mask is carefully taken off by handling the ties or loops without touching the front

Zeynep Tufekci, a professor of information science, remarked that messaging on masking should have been used to provide proper instructions to the public (as was done for hand washing) rather than used to discourage people from masking because of the possibility that they would wear them improperly, as had happened early in the pandemic. The European Centre for Disease Prevention and Control highlighted that the appropriate use of face masks in communities could be improved through education campaigns and is key for its effectiveness as a measure. Health institutions such as the World Health Organization have provided public guidance on the do's and don'ts on masking.

== Shortages of face masks ==
=== Early epidemic in mainland China ===
As the epidemic accelerated, the mainland market in China saw a shortage of face masks due to increased public demand. Face masks were quickly sold out in stores throughout China. Hoarding and price gouging drove up prices, so the market regulator said it would crack down on such acts. In January 2020, price controls were imposed on all face masks on Taobao and Tmall. Other Chinese e-commerce platforms – JD.com, Suning.com, Pinduoduo – did likewise; third-party vendors would be subject to price caps, with violators subject to sanctions.

By March, China had quadrupled its production capacity to a hundred million masks per day.

=== National stocks and shortages ===
At the beginning of the COVID-19 outbreak in the United States, the U.S.'s Strategic National Stockpile contained just twelve million N95 respirators, far fewer than estimates of the amount required. Millions of N95s and other supplies were purchased from 2005 to 2007 using congressional supplemental funding, but 85 million N95s were distributed to combat the 2009 swine flu pandemic, and Congress did not make the necessary appropriations to replenish stocks. The Stockpile's primary focus has also primarily been on biodefense (defense against a terrorist or weapon of mass destruction attack) and response to natural disaster, with the infectious disease a secondary focus. By 1 April 2020, the Stockpile was nearly emptied of protective gear. In January and February 2020, U.S. manufacturers, with the encouragement of the Trump administration, shipped millions of face masks and other personal protective equipment to the PRC, a decision that subsequently prompted criticism given the mask shortage that the U.S. faced during the pandemic.

In France, 2009 H1N1-related spending rose to €382 million, mainly on supplies and vaccines, which was later criticized. It was decided in 2011 to not replenish its stocks and rely more on supply from China and just-in-time logistics. In 2010, its stock included a billion surgical masks and 600 million FFP2 masks; in early 2020, it was 150 million and zero respectively. While stocks were progressively reduced, a 2013 rationale stated the aim to reduce costs of acquisition and storage, now distributing this effort to all private enterprises as an optional best practice to ensure their workers' protection. This was especially relevant to FFP2 masks, more costly to acquire and store. As the COVID-19 pandemic in France took an increasing toll on medical supplies, masks and PPE supplies ran low, causing national outrage. France needed forty million masks per week, according to French president Emmanuel Macron. France instructed its few remaining mask-producing factories to work 24/7 shifts and to ramp up national production to forty million masks per month. French lawmakers opened an inquiry on the past management of these strategic stocks. The mask shortage has been called a "scandal d'État" (State scandal). Thousands of French individuals and companies teamed up during the outbreak to form a decentralized network of Fab labs and ad-hoc retooled production facilities, producing more than a million face shields, masks and other kinds of PPE during the height of the pandemic.

In late March and early April 2020, as Western countries were, in turn, dependent on China for supplies of masks and other equipment, China was seen as making a soft-power play to influence world opinion. However, a batch of masks purchased by the Netherlands was rejected as being sub-standard. The Dutch health ministry issued a recall of 600,000 face masks from a Chinese supplier on 21 March which did not fit properly and whose filters did not work as intended despite them having a quality certificate. The Chinese Ministry of Foreign Affairs responded that the customer should "double-check the instructions to make sure that you ordered, paid for, and distributed the right ones. Do not use non-surgical masks for surgical purposes." Eight million of eleven million masks delivered to Canada in May also failed to meet standards.

=== Theft ===
Thefts of face masks and other personal protective equipment were reported at hospitals in the United States and other countries. The Naval Medical Center San Diego began mandatory random bag checks for staff members, after several incidents of theft. Hospitals in Canada reported that theft of PPE had become so commonplace that face masks had to be locked away. According to hospital staff, the policy of locking up PPE often resulted in staff requests for PPE being denied. Thefts of N95 masks were reported from a locked hospital office in South Carolina and off-loading docks at the University of Washington.

Two thousand surgical masks were stolen from a hospital in Marseille, France, during the early months of the COVID-19 outbreak, in March. The masks were stolen from an area of the hospital that could only be accessed by surgery patients and staff. A hospital employee in Cooperstown, New York, was charged with misdemeanor larceny for a similar incident. Hospital employees in West Java, Indonesia, were arrested for stealing hundreds of boxes of face masks and selling them on the black market.

One month later an Indiana hospital pharmacy reported a theft to the Drug Enforcement Administration. Along with morphine, with a street value estimated at $3000, the thieves, one of whom was an employee of the hospital and had an access card, had stolen masks and other in-demand goods. In the criminal complaint, filed in Indiana federal court, a DEA task force officer said:

Based on my training and experience, I know these items are highly sought after in the secondary market due to shortages resulting from the Coronavirus pandemic and that these types of items are being sold on the secondary market at an increased price well over fair market value.

A former hospital employee in Georgia was arrested on allegations of stealing masks and gloves from the hospital on five separate occasions after he was fired. Also in April, an employee of the Charlie Norwood VA Medical Center was charged with a misdemeanor for stealing disposable gowns and surgical masks from the hospital. PPE, including masks, were reported stolen by a member of the housekeeping staff at a hospital in Arizona and a physician's assistant in Florida.

According to a BBC News report from August 2020, hospital staff in Ghana were selling PPE on the black market.

Two government workers from the Federal Law Enforcement Training Center in North Charleston, South Carolina, were charged in October for conspiracy to steal PPE, obstruction of justice and lying to the FBI.

=== N95 and FFP masks ===
N95 and FFP masks were in short supply and high demand during the COVID-19 pandemic. Production of N95 masks was limited due to constraints on the supply of nonwoven polypropylene fabric (which is used as the primary filter), as well as the cessation of exports from China. China controls fifty percent of global production of masks, and facing its own coronavirus epidemic, dedicated all its production for domestic use, only allowing exports through government-allocated humanitarian assistance.

=== United States ===
The Strategic National Stockpile had not been refilled following the H1N1 pandemic, which quickly led to respirator and other PPE shortages.

In March 2020, US President Donald Trump applied the Defense Production Act against the American company 3M, which allows the Federal Emergency Management Agency to obtain N95 respirators from 3M. White House trade adviser Peter Navarro said there were concerns that 3M products were not making their way to the US. 3M replied that it has not changed the prices it charges, and was unable to control the prices its dealers or retailers charge.

Jared Moskowitz, the head of the Florida Division of Emergency Management, accused 3M of selling N95 masks directly to foreign countries for cash, instead of to the US. Moskowitz said 3M agreed to authorize distributors and brokers to represent they were selling the masks to Florida, but instead his team for the last several weeks "get to warehouses that are completely empty". He then said the 3M-authorized US distributors later told him the masks Florida contracted for never showed up because the company instead prioritized orders that came in later, for higher prices, from foreign countries (including Germany, Russia, and France).

Forbes reported that "roughly 280 million masks from warehouses around the US had been purchased by foreign buyers [on 30 March 2020] and were earmarked to leave the country, according to the broker – and that was in one day", causing massive critical shortages of masks in the US.

Masks were still in short supply in late September, eight months into the pandemic. The Defense Production Act powers that averted a ventilator shortage were not used as extensively to increase N95 production, despite outcry from healthcare workers. Even though 3M has increased domestic production from 20 million to 95 million masks a month, they say "the demand is more than we, and the entire industry, can supply for the foreseeable future." N95 manufacturers and other companies were reluctant to invest more in domestic mask production because manufacturing in the United States is not profitable for them. There are some American companies who can shift production temporarily to meet the demand for masks but most of them have not received any funding through the DPA. Some have taken the initiative but there were problems with the fit of the masks and obtaining regulatory approvals. 3M and other N95 manufacturers have not entered into any corporate partnerships to share intellectual property or increase N95 production.

Trump gave Rear Admiral John Polowczyk the responsibility for PPE logistics. Polowczyk said he believed "hospital systems are making management decisions that might lead to an appearance that we still don't have masks, which is the furthest from the truth."

By February 2021, suppliers had increased production but not enough to meet demand. Companies cited concerns about post-pandemic demand as a reason for not entering the market. Hospitals increased supplies, but even at well-funded hospitals, healthcare workers could be expected to wear their masks for up to a month. Counterfeits continued to pose problems for purchasers. Numerous calls by public health experts had been made to provide high-filtration masks such as N95s or their equivalents to the general public in high-risk settings.

On 19 January 2022, the Biden administration was reported to have begun freely providing 400 million N95 masks in the United States.

=== Germany ===
In early April 2020, the Berlin politician Andreas Geisel alleged that a shipment of 200,000 N95 masks it had ordered from American producer 3M's China facility was intercepted in Bangkok, Thailand, and diverted to the United States. 3M said they had no knowledge of the shipment, stating "We know nothing of an order from the Berlin police for 3M masks that come from China." The US government denied any confiscation and said they use appropriate channels for all their purchases. Berlin police later confirmed that the shipment was not seized by US authorities.

This revelation outraged the Berlin opposition, whose CDU parliamentary group leader Burkard Dregger accused Geisel of "deliberately misleading Berliners" in order "to cover up its own inability to obtain protective equipment". FDP interior expert Marcel Luthe also criticized Geisel. Politico Europe reported that "the Berliners are taking a page straight out of the Trump playbook and not letting facts get in the way of a good story." The Guardian also reported that "There is no solid proof Trump [nor any other American official] approved the [German] heist."

German citizens decided to contribute to solving the supply crisis by making their own masks and other types of PPE like face shields that gave masks additional protection; the largest group of makers measured 6,800 individuals, collectively producing more than 100,000 pieces of protective equipment.

=== Canada ===
As more countries restricted the export of N95 masks, Novo Textiles in British Columbia announced plans to start producing N95 masks in Canada. AMD Medicom in Quebec had long been the main Canadian company producing N95s, but China, France, the Republic of China (Taiwan) and the United States all banned exports of medical equipment, barring Medicom's factories there from exporting the masks to Canada. The Government of Canada subsequently awarded Medicom a 10-year contract to build a factory to produce masks in Montreal.

== Mask industry ==
=== Manufacturing ===
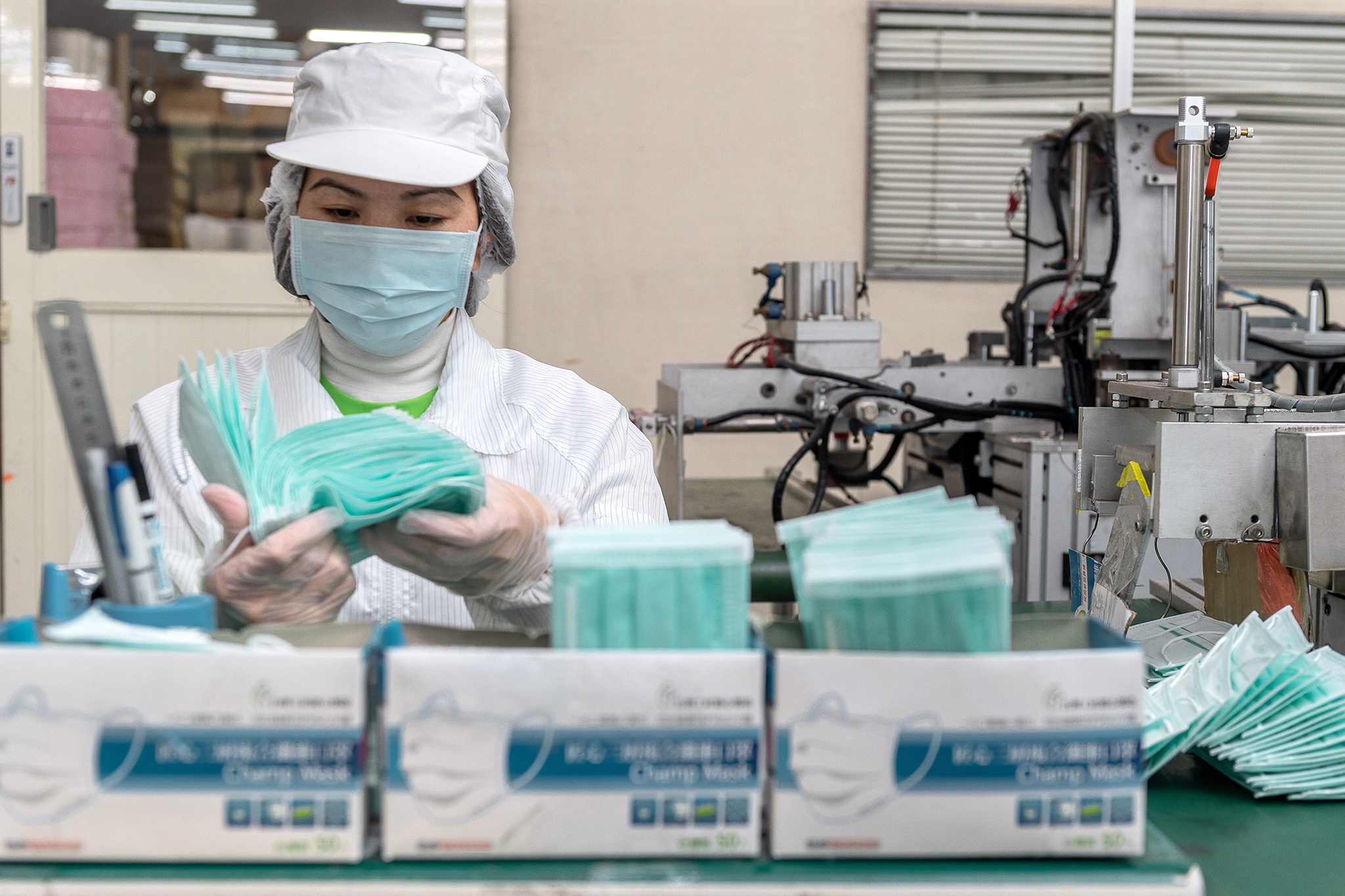
Masks being produced in Taiwan

==== China ====
As of 2019, mainland China manufactured half the world's output of masks. As COVID-19 spread, enterprises in several countries quickly started or increased the production of face masks. Cottage industries and volunteer groups also emerged, manufacturing cloth masks for localized use. They used various patterns, including some with a bend-to-fit nosepiece insert. Individual hospitals developed and requested a library of specific patterns.

In the first five months of 2020, 70,802 new companies registered in China to make or trade face masks, a 1,256% increase compared to 2019, and 7,296 new companies registered to make or trade melt blown fabrics, a key component of face masks, a 2,277% rise from 2019.

In April, however, the Chinese government stepped in with tighter regulations. 867 producers of the melt-blown fabric were shut down in Yangzhong city alone. Many speculative manufacturers were forced to quit due to changing export rules and tighter licensing requirements in China and weaker demand for lower quality products globally.

==== Open-Source and Do-It-Yourself Masks ====
Open Source Medical Supplies coordinated and shared open-source mask designs.

=== Distribution ===
Some clinical stockpiles have proved inadequate in scale, and the non-medical market demand expanded dramatically as the general public determined that masks were essential, or they began obeying public health mandates, or both.

Between April and June 2020, sellers on Etsy sold 29 million cloth face masks worth an estimated $364 million. Approximately four million people (about seven percent of buyers) visited the website just to buy masks.

== Society and culture ==
=== Attitudes ===
In mid-2020 as the pandemic grew, the public interest in face masks as a means of protection was greatly increased, often even before governments implemented mandatory mask-wearing.

In East Asian societies, a primary reason for mask-wearing is to protect others from oneself. The broad assumption behind the act is that anyone, including seemingly healthy people, can be a carrier of the coronavirus. The usage of masks is seen as a collective responsibility to reduce the transmission of the virus. A face mask is thus seen as a symbol of solidarity in Eastern countries. Elsewhere, the need for mask-wearing is still often seen from an individual perspective where masks only serve to protect oneself. In April 2020, a study comparing masking-related perceptions between China and three German speaking countries (Austria, Germany, and Switzerland) also showed that Chinese had stronger pro-masking perceptions than the European participants. However, in 2020, people began promoting a new meaning of masking as an act of solidarity to each other.

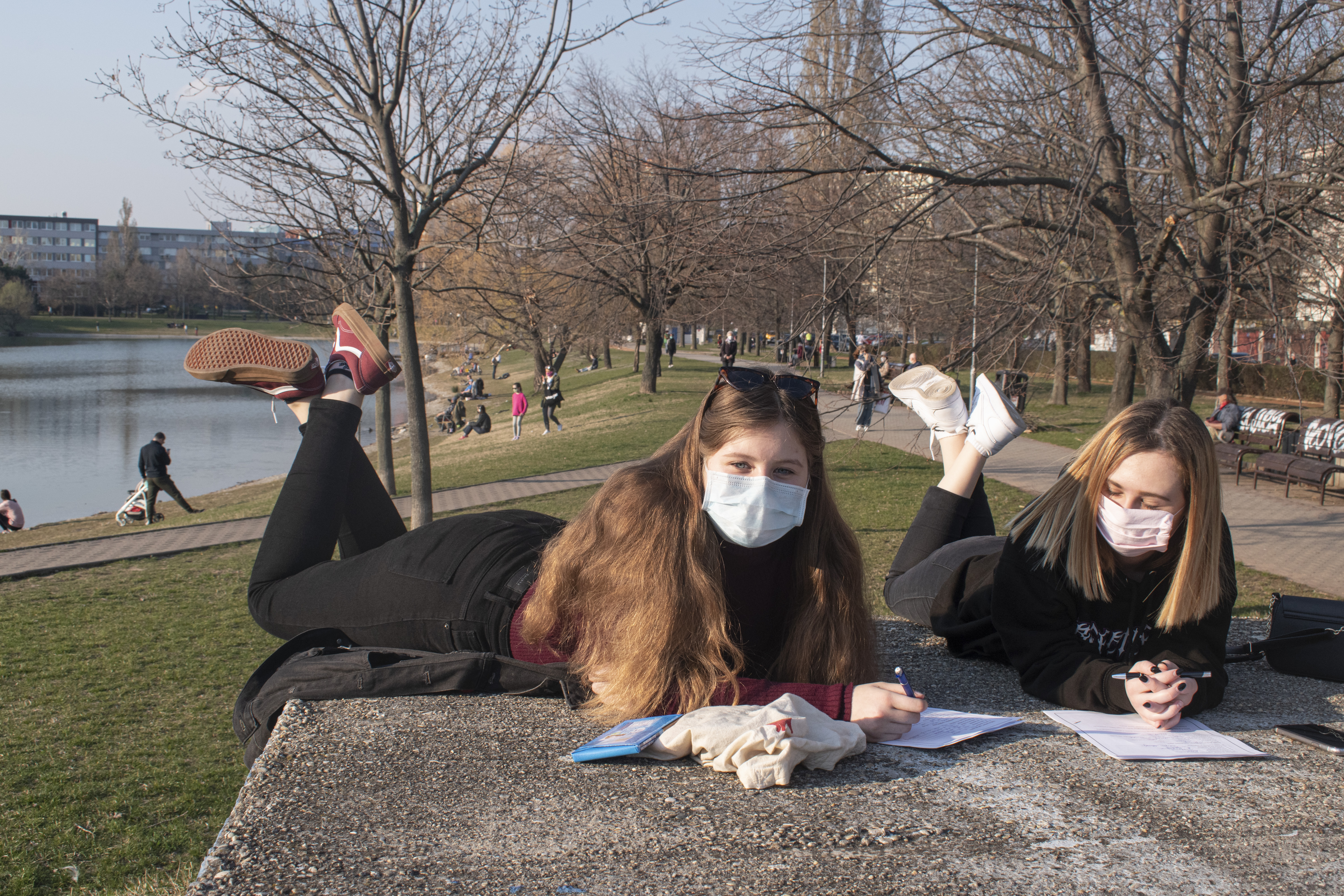
Slovakia was one of the first countries in the world to introduce universal masking in public places

Existing cultural norms and social pressure may impede mask-wearing in public, which may explain why masking was initially avoided in the West. According to Joseph Tsang, a Hong Kong doctor, and infectious disease expert, the promotion of universal masking may resolve perceptions against mask-wearing because mask-wearing is intimidating if few people wear masks due to cultural barriers, but if all people wear masks it shows a message that people are in this together. A May 2020 study surveying people in Spain showed that an individual's likelihood of voluntarily wearing a mask is positively correlated with the proportion of uptake in the surrounding area.

Helene-Mari van der Westhuizen et al. state that successful implementation of public masking policies, especially in communities that have no cultural traditions for such interventions, requires a reframing of social meanings and moral worth, and that public messages help to conceptualize who typically wear masks and what the moral valence of masking is. They note that the earliest members who wear face coverings may be seen as deviant when the community starts to adopt masking, but that changing narratives will generate new meanings that construe those who do not mask as deviant. Their argument is that public health messaging about face coverings should shift from masks as a medical intervention to masks as a social practice based on values such as social responsibility and solidarity, as a successful uptake requires face coverings to be grounded in the social and cultural realities of affected communities. Clemens Eisenmann and Christian Meyer argue that the question, how the meaning of wearing face masks develops in society, depends on their practical and public uses within everyday social interactions. They explain that masking has destabilized interactional infrastructures embedded in routines, revealing both taken-for-granted infrastructures of everyday life – including social inequalities (such as those of people reliant on lip reading) and moral evaluations in transcultural situations (such as those involving implicit racism in which the health instructions of essential workers belonging to certain groups are disregarded) – and new challenges on the interactional level.

In the Western world, as of 2020 the public usage of masks still often carried a large stigma, being seen as a sign of sickness. This stigmatization is a large obstacle to overcome, because people may feel too ashamed to wear a mask in public and therefore opt to not wear one. There is also a divide within the Western world, as seen in the Czech Republic and Slovakia where mass mobilization has occurred to reinforce the solidarity in mask-wearing since March 2020.

Mask-wearing has been called a prosocial behavior in which one protects others within their community. On social media, there has been an effort with the #masks4all campaign to encourage people to use masks. Nevertheless, there were many occurrences of violence and hostility by people who became aggressive after they were requested to wear a mask or saw people wearing masks in customer-based establishments. Multiple people were killed in attacks by people who refused to wear masks. It led to concerns about worker safety, so employees were discouraged to actively enforce masking policies due to the potential of hostile situations, while enforcement by official authorities is severely lacking.

Masking has been subjected to racial politics in Western countries. For instance, in 2020 it had been heavily racialized as an Asian phenomenon. This had been reinforced in a lot of media discourses, where stories about the pandemic were often accompanied by unrelated imagery of Asian people in masks. The focus on race brought hostility towards Asians who are confronted with the choice to wear masks as a precaution while they face discrimination for it. Huang Yinxiang, a sociologist from the University of Manchester, described maskaphobia (negative prejudice, fear or bitter hatred against people wearing face masks) as making Asians in Western countries into targets for racists who want to legitimize xenophobia during the COVID-19 outbreak. Likewise, people from certain groups such as Black Americans may not feel comfortable wearing masks, especially those that are not clearly medical but homemade masks, due to concerns of racial profiling.

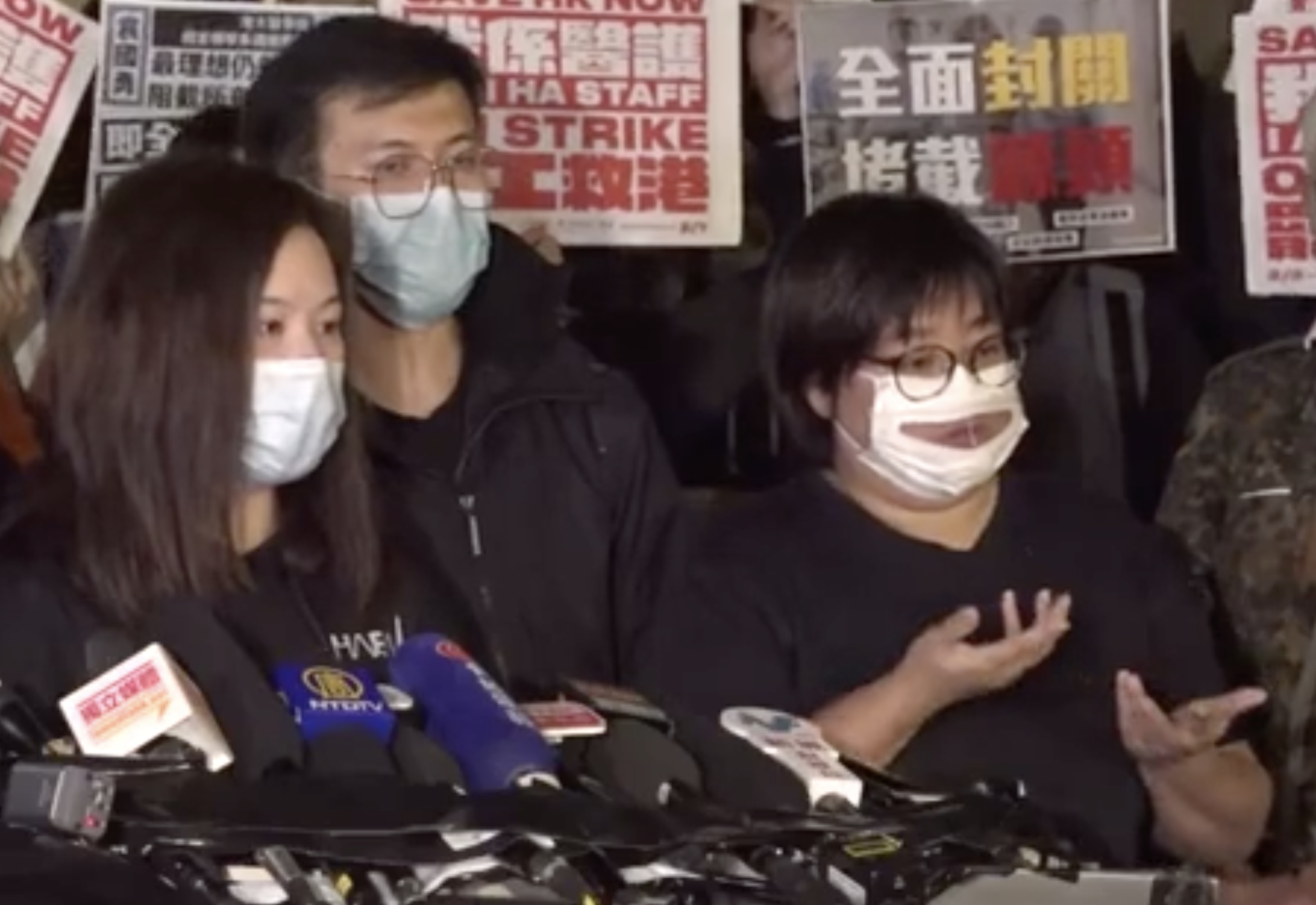
A sign language interpreter (on the right) in Hong Kong is wearing a transparent mask to allow lip reading

There have also been concerns that wearing masks may also further isolate disadvantaged communities. Concerns had been expressed that masks would make communication difficult for people who are deaf or hard-of-hearing. This led to calls for wider distributions of transparent masks, which allow for lip reading.

Similar concerns over difficulty in communicating were expressed by those who may depend on dogs for therapeutic or social reasons, as the animals depend on body language such as facial expressions. Conversely, people who are exempt from wearing masks on medical grounds or due to a disability, fear they will be subjected to abuse for not wearing a mask, even if they are legally exempt from doing so. For instance, in the United Kingdom, the charity Disability Rights UK received numerous reports about people being confronted on trains and buses. Health organizations such as the American Lung Association commented that, even though there may be people who will seek an exemption, the individual's concerns needs to be weighed against the societal needs to limit the spread of the virus. However, anti-maskers have called upon bogus claims about legal or medical exemptions in their refusal to wear masks. They have, for instance, claimed that the Americans with Disabilities Act (designed to prohibit discrimination based on disabilities) allows exemption from mask requirements, but the United States Department of Justice responded that the act "does not provide a blanket exemption to people with disabilities from complying with legitimate safety requirements necessary for safe operations".

There were concerns about the effects of mask-wearing on young children's language development and social emotional development. It has been argued that mask mandates for children may have taken insufficient consideration of children's human rights.

In November 2020, there were feelings of mask fatigue among the general public, exacerbated by frustrations about people who are not taking the mask and other guidelines seriously as the pandemic and its intensity continued on.

=== Trends ===
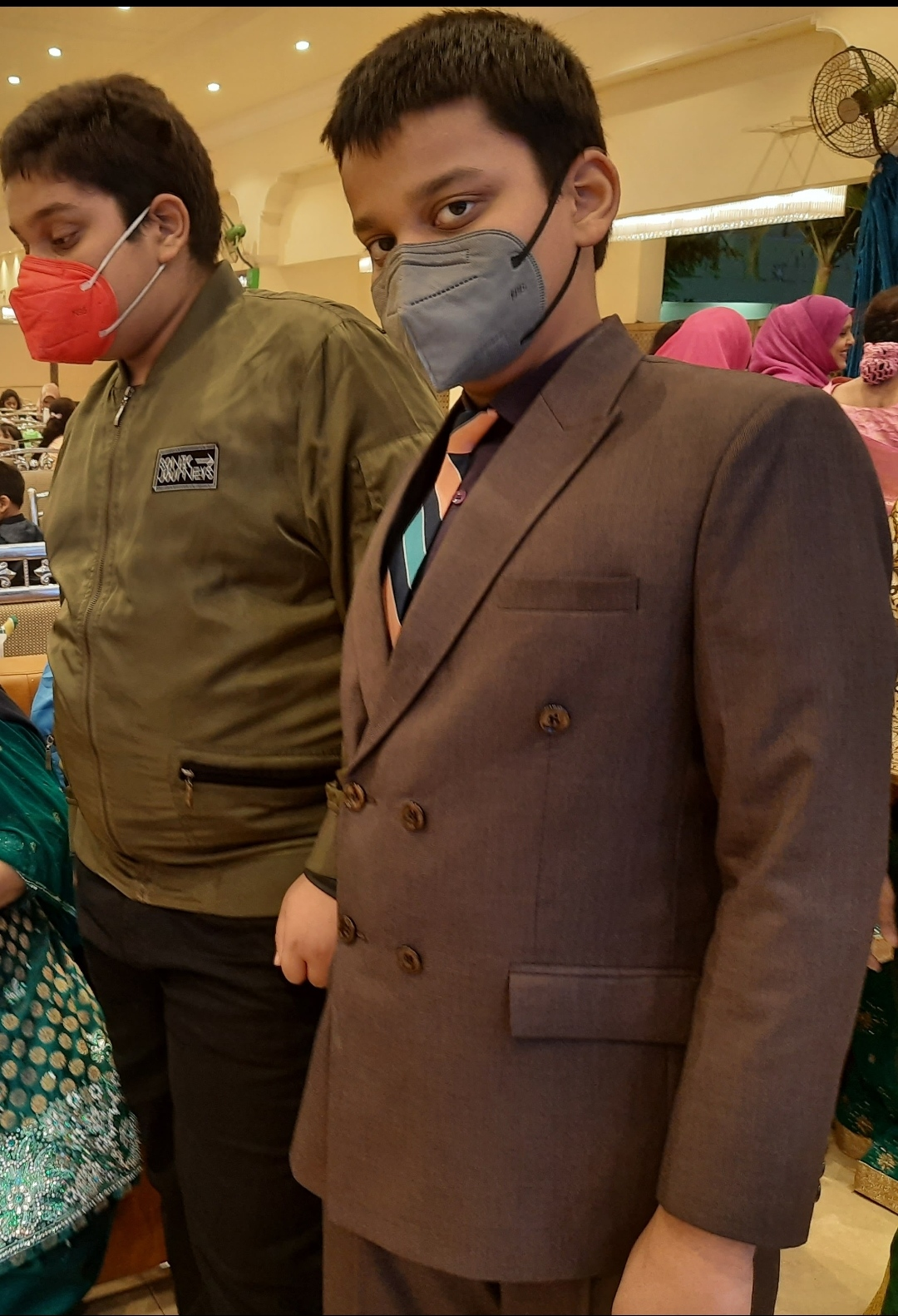
Two Indian boys wearing face masks at a public event

Among the European countries surveyed by YouGov in the first half of 2020, the likelihood for people to wear masks was split: In Northern Europe (e.g., Finland, Sweden, Norway, and Denmark), people were very unlikely to wear a mask. In Western Europe (e.g., Italy, Spain, France, and Germany), people were initially unlikely to use a mask, but mask wearing greatly changed from low levels in March to higher levels in May. A similar, if delayed, pattern was seen in some northern European countries. For example, mask usage was very low in Denmark up until the summer of 2020 but rapidly increased in the autumn as rules on their use in publicly accessible indoor places were introduced. An exception was the United Kingdom where mask usage only grew gradually in the first half of 2020, but it rose very quickly after official policy changes in July mandated masking in stores. In May 2020, masking was gradually shifting to become a new social norm.

A survey among people from the United States (conducted from April to June 2020) indicates that age was a factor in whether people were likely to wear a mask, as the likelihood rose with the age group, but the reported use of face masks increased significantly across all age groups over time. Furthermore, people who did not report mask use also reported engaging in significantly fewer other mitigation behaviors than those who did report mask use.

In 2020, gender played a role in the willingness to wear masks; men were overall less inclined to wear masks in public than women. There were indications that men were more likely to feel negative emotions (such as shame) and stigma for wearing masks. It was suggested that this male behavior is driven by a sense of masculinity, where the act of masking is possibly perceived to run counter to it, which led to an increase in men not wearing masks. A 2020 survey among participants recruited from Amazon Mechanical Turk about face mask perceptions found that men and women may have different reasons when they do not wear masks in public: Men were more likely to see masks as an infringement upon their independence and women were more likely to perceive masks as being uncomfortable, while perceptions on efficacy, accessibility, compensation, inconvenience, appearance, and attention did not differ.

When the COVID-19 vaccine was released in 2021, face mask usage among all groups of individuals plummeted, as local and national governments began to relax regulations as the pandemic began to recede. However, during this period, vaccinated people were still more likely to wear a mask than unvaccinated people.

By 2023, most jurisdictions had ended their mask mandates. By May 2023, people in most countries largely stopped wearing masks.

=== Governmental role ===
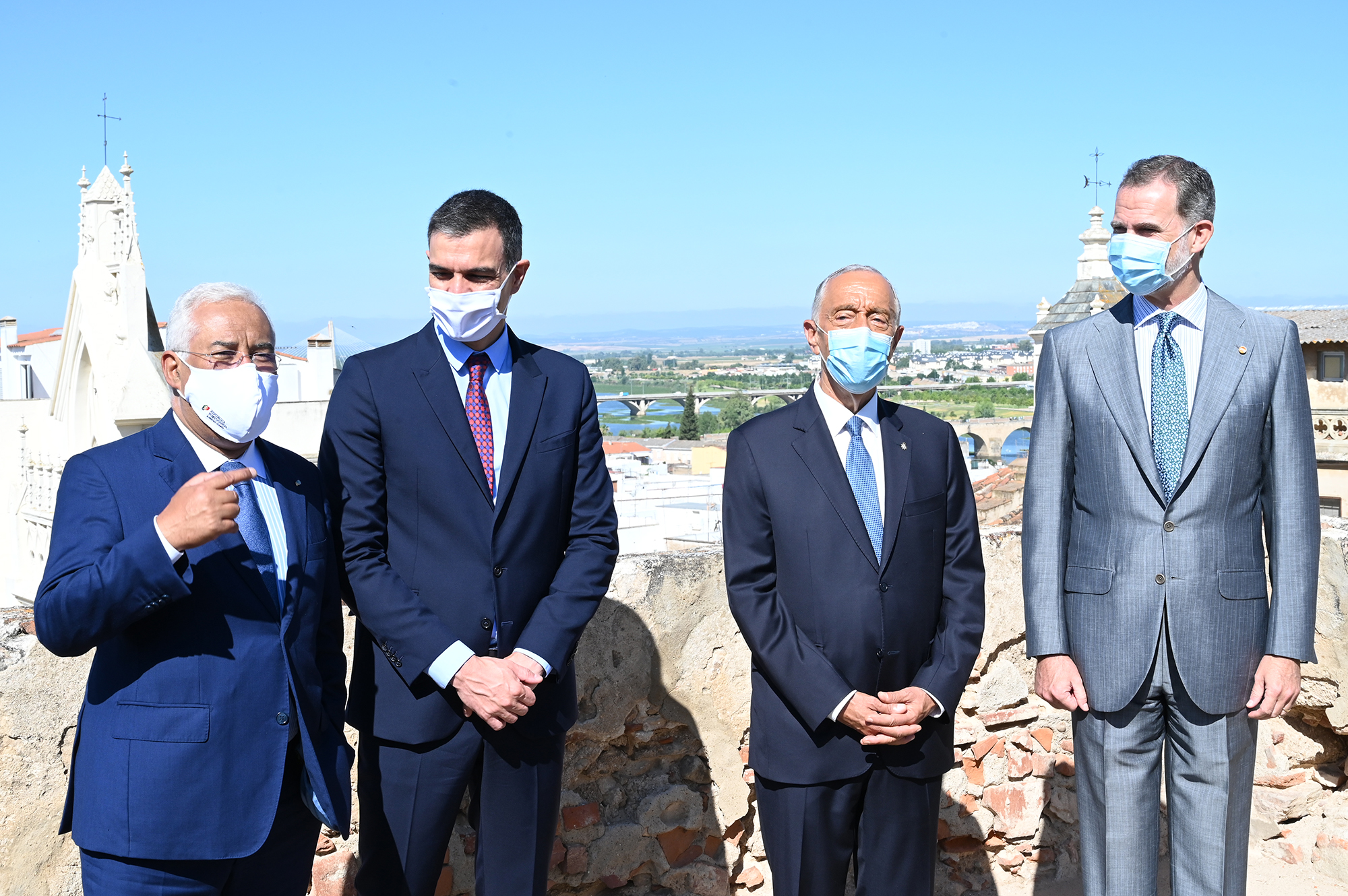
The heads of state and government of Portugal and Spain wearing face masks during an official ceremony in July 2020

The pandemic raised questions about the role of governments in mask policies, either voluntary or mandatory policies, especially in terms of the social and behavioral consequences involving the general public.

The results from a study surveying people in Germany indicated that the act of wearing a mask, independent of the policy, is considered a social contract in which compliant people perceive each other more positively and noncompliance is negatively evaluated. However, it also suggested that voluntary policies have the potential effect to increase polarization and thus cause more stigmatization. The authors recommended that countries and communities should adopt a mandatory policy along with explicit communication of the benefits of both masking (e.g., risk reduction, mutual protection, positive social signaling) and mandatory policies (e.g., fairness, less stigmatization, higher effectiveness) to encourage the public to wear masks.

World leaders, as role models, also received much scrutiny, as they were considered key to conveying the critical public health message to the public. For example, Slovakia was cited as a country where its public figures (including President Zuzana Čaputová and her administration) set the example by wearing masks and played a crucial role to normalize masks. In contrast, in the United States, President Donald Trump and his administration came under criticism for communicating an inconsistent and confusing message about masking. They were often criticized for undercutting national and local public health advice to wear masks.

=== Politics ===
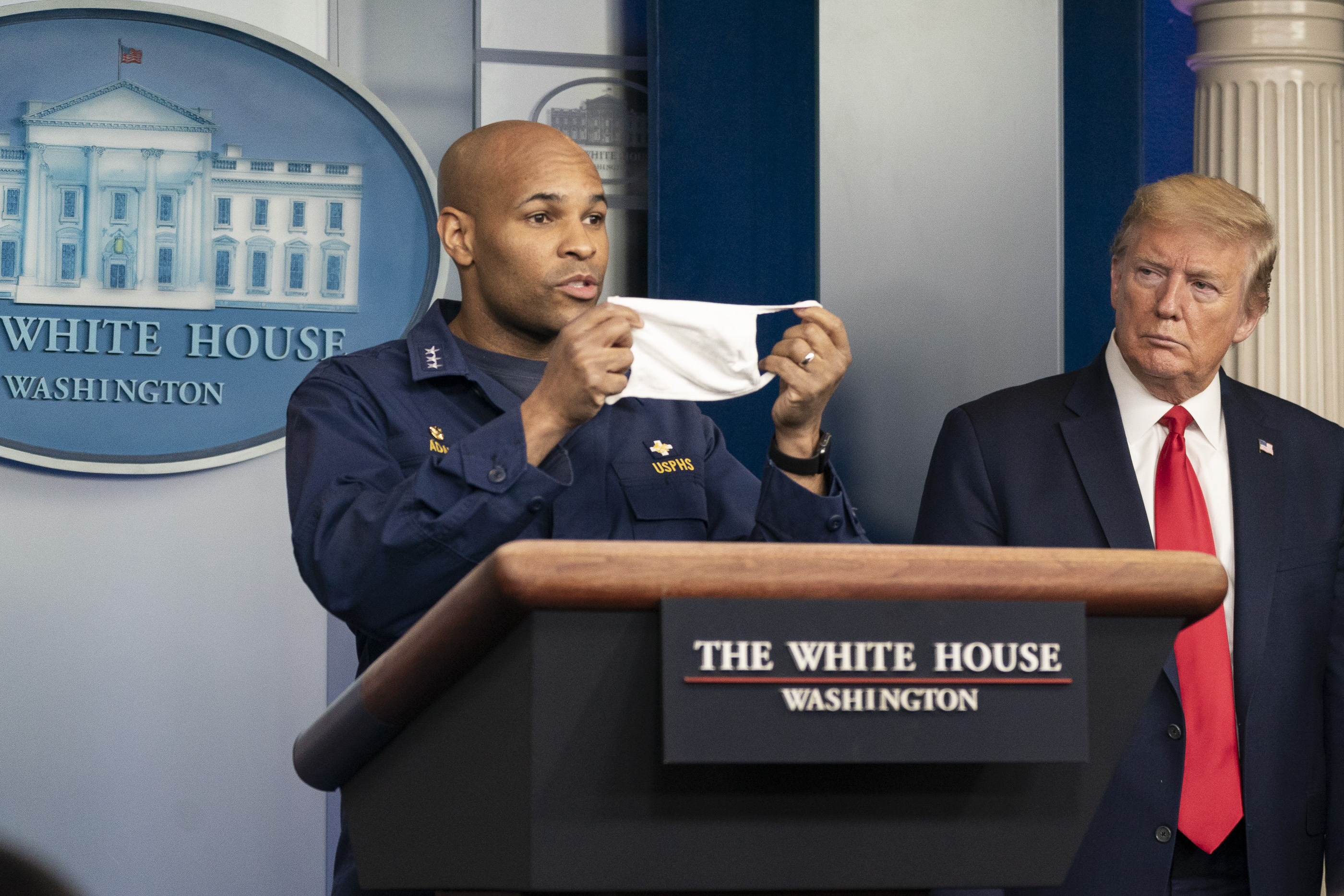
U.S. Surgeon General Jerome Adams urged people to wear face masks and acknowledged that it is difficult to correct earlier messaging that masks do not work for the general public

Although authorities, especially in Asia, recommended people to wear face masks in public, in many other parts of the world, conflicting advice caused much confusion among the general population. Several governments and institutions, such as in the United States, initially dismissed the use of face masks by the general population, often with misleading or incomplete information about the usefulness of masks. Commentators have attributed the anti-mask messaging to efforts to manage the mask shortages, as governments did not act quickly enough, remarking that the claims go beyond the science or were simply lies. On 12 June 2020, Anthony Fauci, a key member of the White House coronavirus task force, confirmed that the American public were not told to wear masks from the beginning due to the shortages of masks and explained that masks do actually work.

In the United States, public masking has become a political issue, as opponents argue that it inhibits personal freedom and proponents emphasize the importance of masks for public health. Some people may see it as a political statement. Party affiliation partly determined how likely people were to embrace the wearing of masks in public. Democrats were more likely to wear masks than Republicans. Masks have become an aspect of the culture war that has emerged over the course of the pandemic. Commentators argue that the resistance against masks partly stems from the confusing and mixed messaging about masking.

Matthew Facciani, a sociologist at Vanderbilt University, says the uncertainty from health experts during the early days of the pandemic paved the way for political leaders to become a prominent source of guidance and clarity. He argues that once mask-wearing became informed by political beliefs, it is difficult to correct due to the motivation to protect one's identity in relation to a political group and the reinforcement from political echo chambers, no matter that scientists began to better understand the severity of the virus and the evidence in favor for mask wearing became clearer. Moreover, how people observe the masking rules seems to be different across countries and these differences may be attributed to cultural or management factors.

In April 2020, health officials from Taiwan's Central Epidemic Command Center (CECC) pushed back on school bullying of boys in pink face masks. CECC officials and Minister of Health and Welfare Chen Shih-chung wore pink masks to challenge gender norms at a press conference, while various government agencies demonstrated solidarity by changing the colors on their Facebook pages to pink. The minister later tweeted "Pink is for everyone and no color is exclusive for girls or boys. Gender Equality lies at the heart of Taiwan values." The press conference was held amid reports that male students were too embarrassed to wear their pink face masks, jeopardizing their safety and the safety of others in the face of COVID-19.

=== Opposition ===
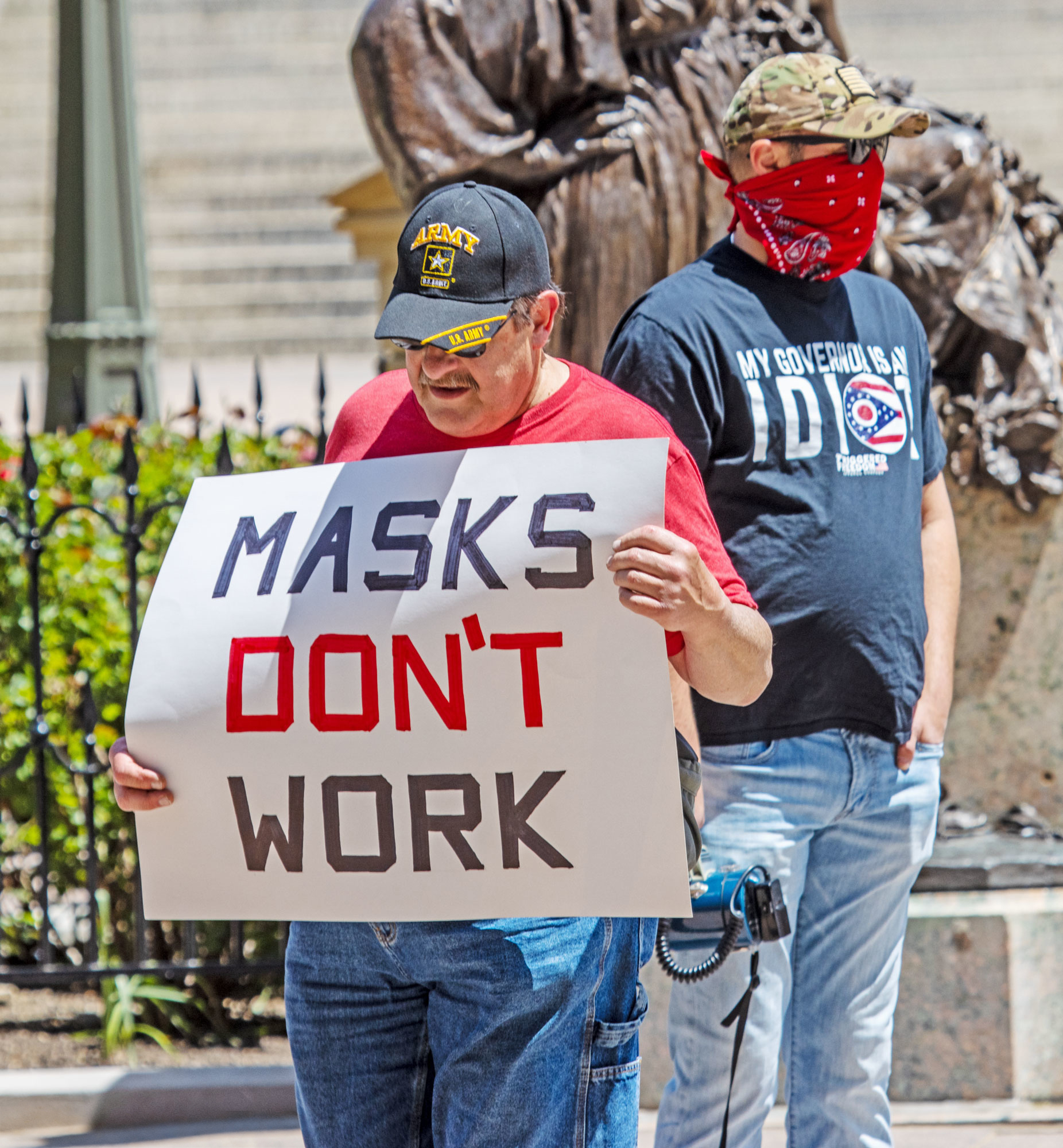
"Masks Don't Work", a protest placard in Ohio, United States, during the COVID-19 pandemic in May 2020

In some countries, large rallies took place in protest against masking mandates. In Canada, opponents of masking hailed their protests as the "March to Unmask". In the United Kingdom, new protests came in the wake of the official announcement that masking will be compulsory in shops. Eight months after the beginning of the lockdown in the Czech Republic, mass demonstrations against the restrictions imposed by the government arose. Some anti-mask protestors co-opted the feminist slogan "my body, my choice" and the Black Lives Matter slogan "I can't breathe". Businesses were also purposely disrupted by anti-maskers (purportedly in defense of their constitutional rights).

In the United States, opposition to mask-wearing during the COVID-19 pandemic came as a result of then-President Donald Trump's politicization of science and, more generally, due to older trends of science politicization. American opposition to mask-wearing during pandemics is not new; during the 1918 influenza pandemic, the Anti-Mask League was established in San Francisco, California.

In May 2021, Vice reported that some members of the anti-vaccine community were promoting the use of masks and social distancing to protect themselves from those who have received vaccines, citing false claims that those vaccinated for COVID-19 "shed" spike proteins that can be harmful to people in their proximity, and former research scientist Judy Mikovits claimed that she had been kicked off a plane for wearing a mask lined with colloidal silver.

=== Attractiveness ===
Face masks are sometimes deemed to make people look more attractive. This may be because they hide unattractive features or are associated with medical personnel.

=== Personality ===
Some people, including introverts and those with social anxiety, prefer using face masks because of the near-anonymity it provides, allowing them to easily blend in, feel psychologically protected, and be more open in talking to strangers.

=== Religion ===
In 2020, in the state of Utah, Christian clergy from the Lutheran, Catholic, Presbyterian, Anglican, Baptist, and Latter-day Saint traditions, as well as those from the Jewish, Buddhist, and Unitarian religions, implored people to wear masks by signing a letter sent out by Governor Gary Herbert's office.

=== Fashion ===
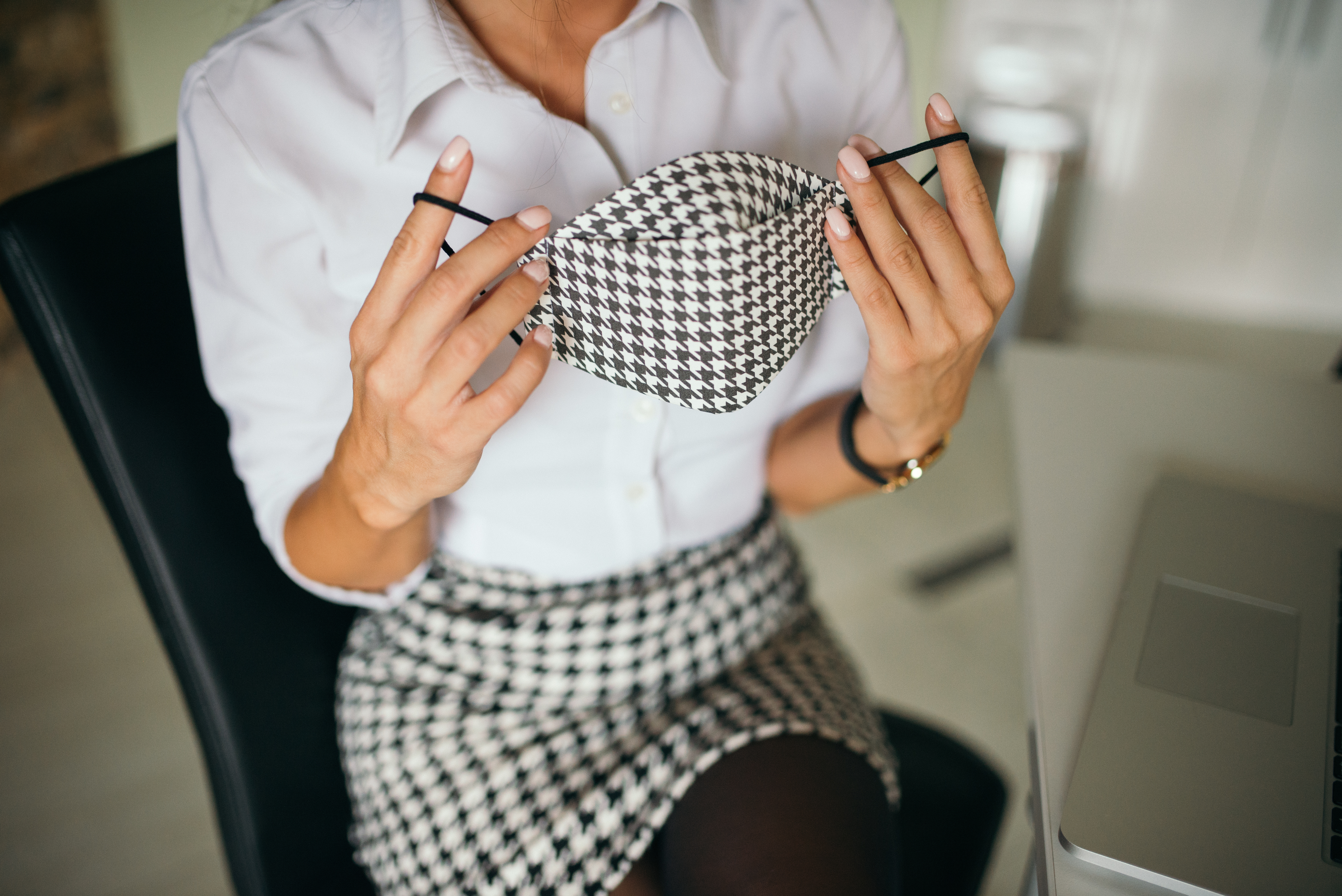
A cloth face mask matching the rest of the ensemble

As the pandemic progressed, people began making use of face masks as accessories, matching them to their outfits. Early in the pandemic, people and businesses from the fashion industry responded to official calls for help in overcoming the shortages of protective personal equipment including face masks. These masks were sheerly utilitarian as the only consideration at the time was function. What began as a public health necessity gradually evolved into a new category of accessories subject to similar design and marketing considerations as other accessories. Fashion brands eventually reopened their factories for production due to the increasing demand for masks and started to manufacture masks in a wider variety of styles. Smaller brands, who primarily sold their products online, found that selling masks worked as an effective strategy to maintain sales. Etsy became a major online platform where many designers sold their masks. Designers started making masks that matched other pieces of clothing and accessories, a trend which may have begun unintentionally as even fabric remnants were repurposed.

The city of Vilnius in Lithuania held a "Mask Fashion Week" in May 2020, which was promoted with billboards (with no catwalks or displays) around the city featuring local people including Mayor Remigijus Šimašius wearing face masks.

The Walt Disney Company introduced uniform face masks for their employees at Walt Disney World and Disneyland in the United States.

=== Environment ===
Large numbers of disposed face masks have led to an increase in plastic waste, negatively impacting the environment. Moreover, the production of face masks also contributes the emission of carbon dioxide, which accelerates global warming. Considering the risk of plastic pollution, researchers have focused on using biodegradable polymers to fabricate facemask with antimicrobial properties. Various studies were conducted in order to utilize end-of-life face masks, including thermochemical conversion of polymers used in face-masks to hydrogen rich gas. Thermochemical methods included carbon-dioxide gasification and steam gasification.

=== Terminology ===
Due to the rarity of their use in non-medical settings outside East Asia, many languages lacked commonly used terms for facemasks, especially since legal issues prevent the usage of terms which might imply medical standards the masks do not meet. In languages such as Saterland Frisian, public competitions were held to create a neologism for the device in the language and thus not having to rely on loanwords or calques. The Friisk Foriining held a similar competition for the North Frisian language.

== See also ==
- Face masks during the COVID-19 pandemic in the United States
- National responses to the COVID-19 pandemic
- Anti-mask law
