= Ear saver =

Device used to protect the wearer's face from hazards

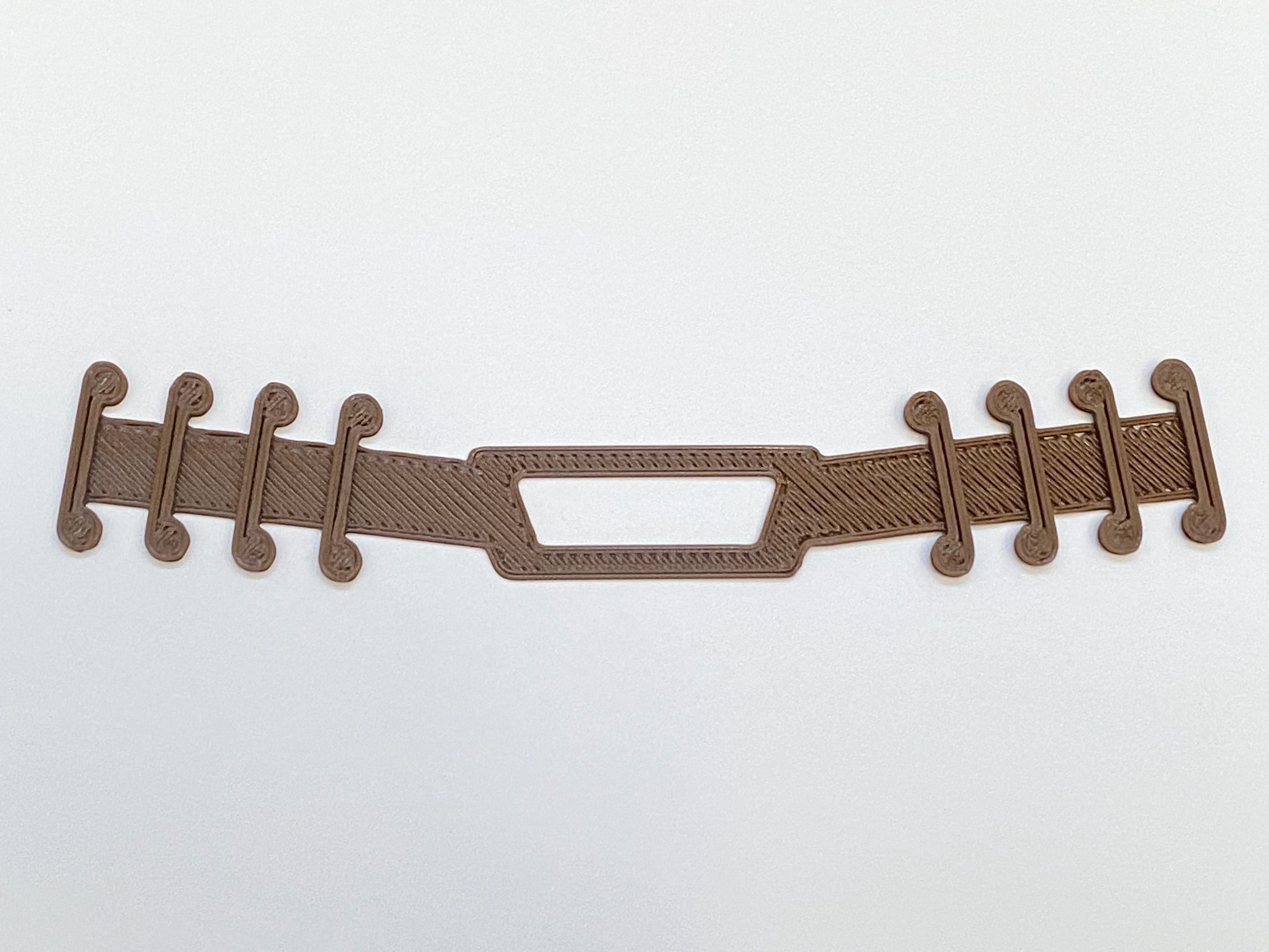
3D printed ear saver

An ear saver, also known as mask strain release strap or mask extender, is an accessory to personal protective equipment (PPE) that relieves the strain on a mask wearer's ears that is created by the loops of face masks. Ear savers were designed as novel items during the COVID-19 pandemic by the open-source hardware community in response to requests from medical professionals reporting heavy strain on their ears. Ear savers have since been commercialized for a broader population of users as the pandemic wore on.

== Manufacturing ==
Four methods are used to manufacture ear savers: 3D printing, laser cutting, injection molding, and sewing (a modified version with crocheted buttons on a headband). During the COVID-19 pandemic, the maker movement alone produced more than 2.2 million ear savers.

== See also ==
- Maker culture
- Face masks during the COVID-19 pandemic
