= Melt blowing =

Micro- and nanofiber fabrication method

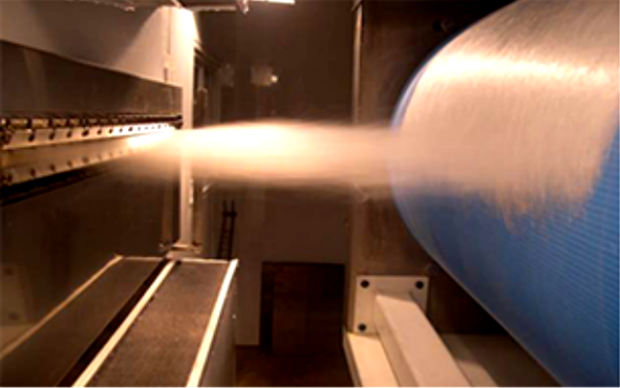
Melt blowing process

Melt blowing is a conventional fabrication method of micro- and nanofibers where a polymer melt is extruded through small nozzles surrounded by high speed blowing gas. The randomly deposited fibers form a nonwoven sheet product applicable for filtration, sorbents, apparels and drug delivery systems. The substantial benefits of melt blowing are simplicity, high specific productivity and solvent-free operation. Choosing an appropriate combination of polymers with optimized rheological and surface properties, scientists have been able to produce melt-blown fibers with an average diameter as small as 36 nm.

== History ==
During volcanic activity a fibrous material may be drawn by vigorous wind from molten basaltic magma called Pele's hair. The same phenomenon applies for melt blowing of polymers. The first research on melt blowing was a naval attempt in the US to produce fine filtration materials for radiation measurements on drone aircraft in the 1950s. Later on, Exxon Corporation developed the first industrial process based on the melt blowing principle with high throughput levels. China produces 40% of the non-woven fabric in the world with the majority produced in Hebei province as of 2018.

== Polymers ==
Polymers with thermoplastic behavior are applicable for melt blowing. The main polymer types commonly processed with melt blowing:

- Polypropylene
- Polystyrene
- Polyesters
- Polyurethane
- Polyamides (nylons)
- Polyethylene
- Polycarbonate

== Process ==
Melt blowing is a manufacturing process used to create nonwoven fabrics and materials. It is particularly known for its ability to produce fine fibers, which can be used in various applications. Here's an overview of how melt blowing works:

- Melt Extrusion: The process begins with a polymer resin being melted and extruded through a spinneret, which is a device with tiny holes.
- High-Speed Airflow: Simultaneously, high-speed hot air or gas is blown onto the extruded polymer streams.
- Fiber Formation: The force of the air stretches and elongates the molten polymer into very fine fibers, which are then collected on a moving conveyor belt or drum.

== Uses ==
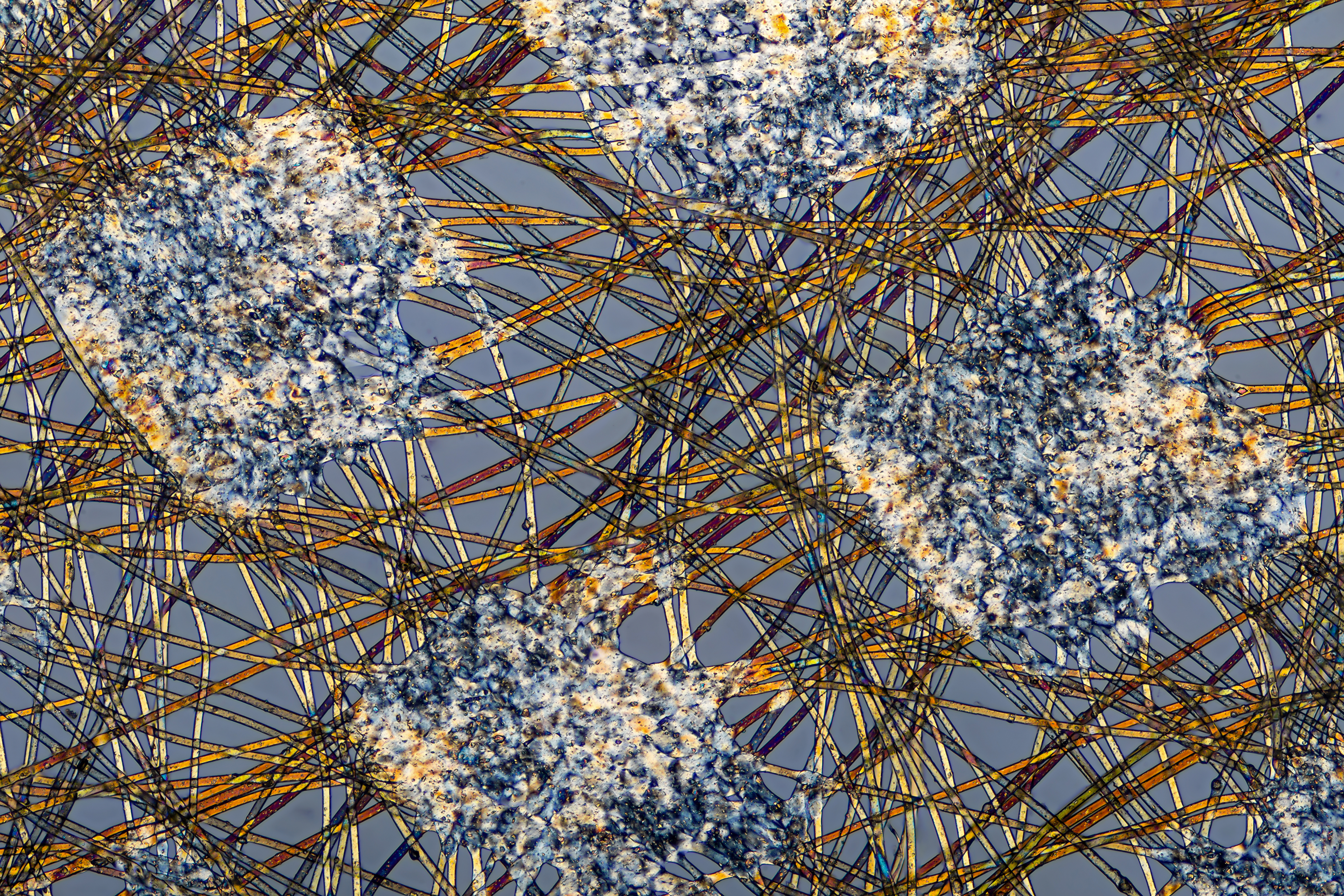
Microscopic image of the outer layer of a surgical mask, made from melt blown polymer filaments

The main uses of melt-blown nonwovens and other innovative approaches are as follows.

=== Filtration ===
Nonwoven melt-blown fabrics are porous. As a result, they can filter liquids and gases. Their applications include water treatment, masks, and air-conditioning filters. During the COVID-19 pandemic, the price of meltblown spiked from few thousand USD per ton to approximately US$100 thousand per ton.

=== Sorbents ===
Nonwoven materials can retain liquids several times their own weight. Thus, those made from polypropylene are ideal for collecting oil contamination.

=== Hygiene products ===
The high absorption of melt-blown fabrics is exploited in disposable diapers and feminine hygiene products.

=== Apparels ===
Melt-blown fabrics have three qualities that help make them useful for clothing, especially in harsh environments: thermal insulation, relative moisture resistance and breathability.

=== Drug delivery ===
Melt blowing can produce drug-loaded fibers for controlled drug delivery. The high drug throughput rate (extrusion feeding), solvent-free operation and increased surface area of the product make melt blowing a new formulation technique.
