= Powered air-purifying respirator =

Full-face respirator that provides filtered air to the wearer using an electric fan

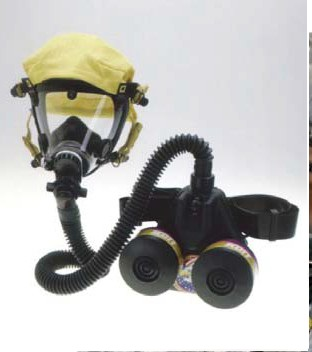
- Other name(s): PAPR
- Regulated by: National Institute for Occupational Safety and Health
- Regulation: 42 CFR 84
- NIOSH schedule: TC-21C
- [edit on Wikidata]

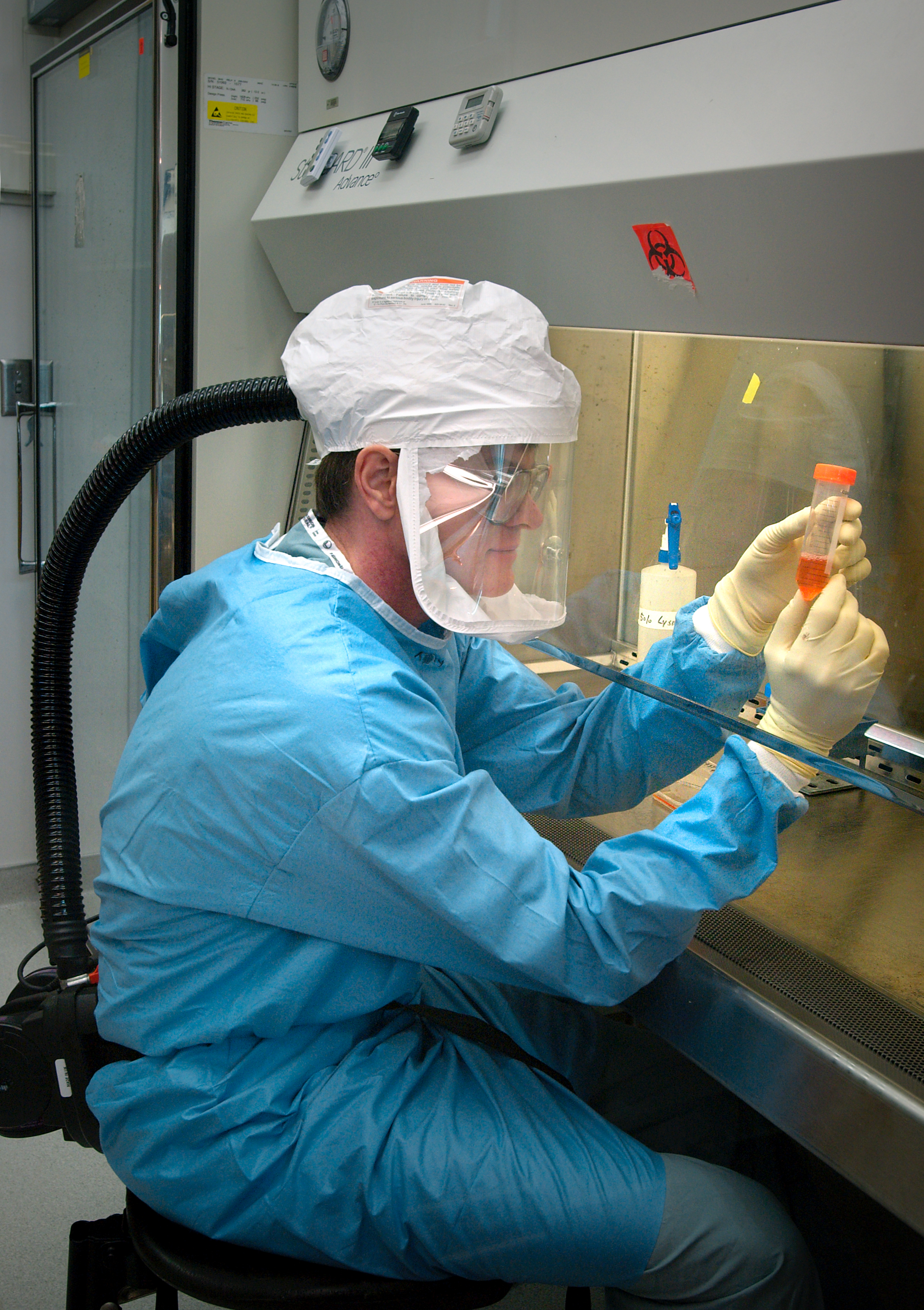
A PAPR, gown, and biosafety cabinet in use in a BSL-3 laboratory. All parts of the PAPR are visible: the waist unit holding the fan, filter, and battery; the hose; and the mask, in this case a flexible, loose-fitting one.

A powered air-purifying respirator (PAPR) is a type of respirator used to safeguard workers against contaminated air. PAPRs consist of a headgear-and-fan assembly that takes ambient air contaminated with one or more type of pollutant or pathogen, actively removes (filters) a sufficient proportion of these hazards, and then delivers the clean air to the user's face or mouth and nose. They have a higher assigned protection factor than filtering facepiece respirators such as N95 masks. PAPRs are sometimes called positive-pressure masks, blower units, or just blowers.

== Description ==
The modularity of PAPRs allows them to be customized for different working environments. Regardless of type, a PAPR consists of:

- some kind of headgear (mask or hood),
- a powered (motor-driven) fan which forces incoming air into the device,
- a filter (or multiple filters) for delivery to the user for breathing, and
- a battery or other power source.

The mask may be hard and tight-fitting, or flexible and loose-fitting. The former affords a higher level of protection, but is less comfortable. Tight-fitting PAPRs require a fit test in hazardous workplace environments, while loose-fitting PAPR users can avoid OSHA fit test requirements in certain hazardous workplace environments (see OSHA's respirator assigned protection factors for more information). Loose-fitting PAPRs can be useful when a fit test for a tight-fitting respirator cannot be successfully passed, for example when facial hair is present. Masks may be reusable or disposable. Some masks allow the full face to be seen by others, aiding in interpersonal communication.

PAPRs have low breathing resistance, unlike filtering facepiece respirators such as N95 masks. A PAPR may have adjustable air flow rates for added comfort. While they are often referred to as positive pressure masks, they are not true positive-pressure devices as overbreathing can overcome the pressure supplied by the fan.

== Filters ==
PAPRs may be outfitted with mechanical filters for atmospheres with particulate contamination, with a chemical cartridge for atmospheres with toxic gases or vapors, or both in combination. PAPRs can provide an assigned protection factor between 25 and 1000 depending on the type, as compared to an N95 mask's assigned protection factor of 10. When comparing various makes and models of PAPR, the supporting documentation from each of the respective manufacturers should be consulted in order to confirm the APF value of each product.

In the United States, HE (high-efficiency) filters are the main class of particulate filter used with PAPRs. These are 99.97% efficient against 0.3 micron particles, the same as a P100 filter. PAPR HE filters used in industry are generally re-used until they are soiled, damaged, or reduce PAPR air flow below specified levels. In healthcare settings involving a live virus, CDC recommends that a practical replacement cycle be implemented.

== Regulatory requirements ==
=== 42 CFR 84 ===
42 CFR 84, from 1995 to 2020, copies 30 CFR 11 rules for PAPRs.^{[N2]}

The following table lists the air flow requirements for NIOSH-approved PAPRs under Part 84.175. Tight-fitting PAPRs may be fit tested with the facepiece unpowered and in negative-pressure (under 29 CFR 1910.134) while loose-fitting PAPR fit test protocols have not been changed from 30 CFR 11.^{[CF2]}

Part 84 air flow requirements
| Facepiece | Air flow in liters/minute |
|---|---|
| Tight-fitting | 115 |
| Loose-fitting | 170 |

The following table lists the ratings for particulate ratings for Part 84 PAPRs.^{[CF2]} PAPR100 ratings were added in 2020.^{[CF3]}

NIOSH particulate classes for powered air-purifying respirators
| Particulate | Respirator class | Minimum efficiency level | Permitted for TB | Permitted for asbestos^{[CF1]} |
|---|---|---|---|---|
| 0.3 micron DOP | HEPA or HE | 99.97% | Yes | Yes |
| 0.075 to 1.86 micron NaCl | PAPR100-N | 99.97% | Rating discontinued | Not yet defined |
| 0.075 to 1.86 micron DOP | PAPR100-P | 99.97% | Rating discontinued | Not yet defined |

PAPR100-N is not designed to filter oil particulates, and the official color-coding for all three respirator types is magenta.^{[CF2]}

A study has demonstrated that users carrying out physical work at intensities 80-85% VO2 max "over-breathe" loose-fitting PAPRs and has recommended an increase of air flow to 400 lpm, an approximately two-fold increase over NIOSH-approved values.

== Usage ==
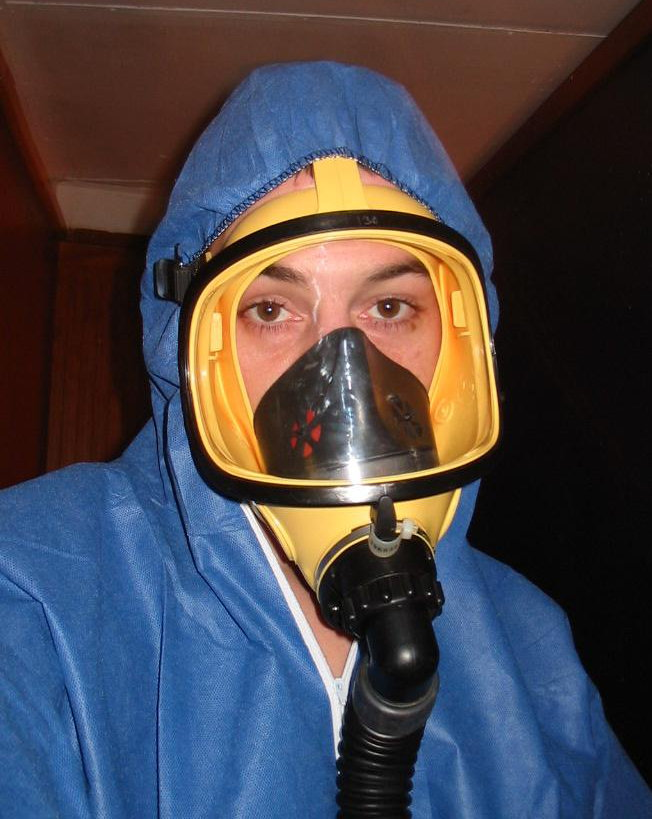
This full-face mask has an inner orinasal mask to reduce dead space, and, since it is being used against asbestos, exhalation valves (white). The hose connects to a PAPR filter-pump.

According to the NIOSH Respirator Selection Logic, PAPRs are recommended for concentrations of hazardous particulates or gases that are greater than the relevant occupational exposure limit but less than the immediately dangerous to life or health (IDLH) level and the manufacturer's maximum-use concentration, subject to the respirator having a sufficient assigned protection factor. For substances hazardous to the eyes, a respirator equipped with a full facepiece, helmet, or hood is recommended. PAPRs are not effective during firefighting, in an oxygen-deficient atmosphere, or in an unknown atmosphere; in these situations a self-contained breathing apparatus or supplied-air respirator is recommended instead.

PAPRs have the advantage of eliminating breathing resistance caused by unpowered negative-pressure respirators such as N95 masks. This makes them usable by persons who are medically disqualified from negative-pressure respirators. Loose-fitting PAPRs may also be selected for people who cannot pass a fit test due to facial hair or other reasons. PAPRs have disadvantages in terms of ergonomic impacts, and they restrict peripheral vision.

=== In healthcare ===
Because they provide higher assigned protection factors, PAPRs are suitable for use during aerosol-generating procedures and by hospital first receivers. In healthcare settings, CDC recommends cleaning of all components except the filter after each use; care must be taken to select PAPRs that are not damaged or deteriorate due to cleaning and disinfecting agents.

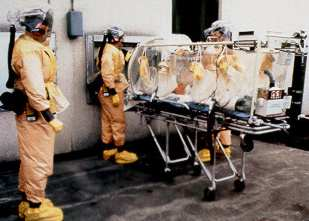
Racal suits consist of a PAPR combined with a separate protective suit. They are used in healthcare settings, in this case by the U.S. Army Aeromedical Isolation Team at Fort Detrick, Maryland

In healthcare, a product known as the Racal suit can be used, consisting of a plastic suit and a PAPR fitted with HEPA filters. They were used by the U.S. Army Aeromedical Isolation Team to perform medical evacuations of patients with highly infectious diseases.

=== For CBRN defense ===
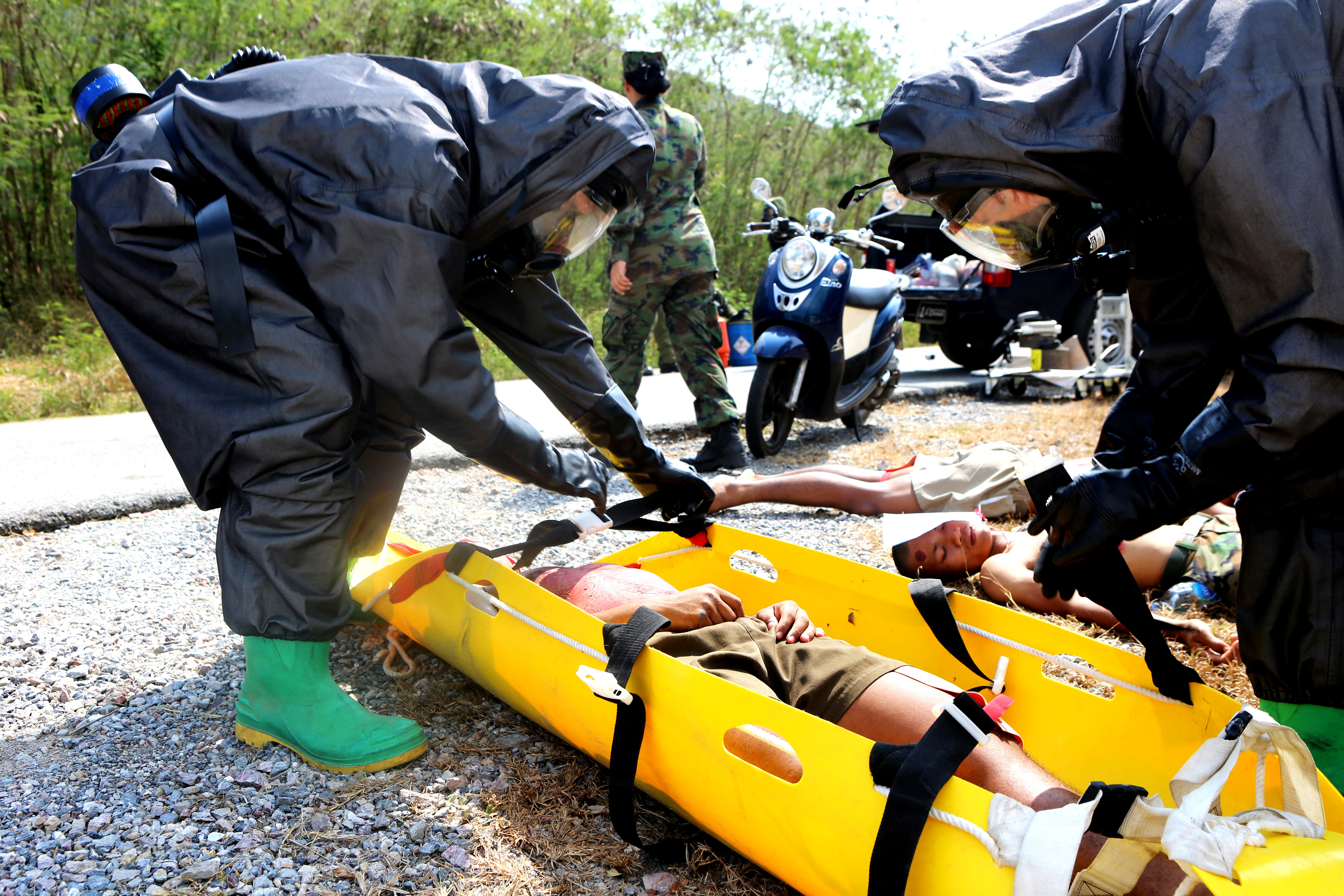
A PAPR is certified for chemical, biological, radiological, and nuclear contaminants (CBRN)

Some PAPRs have special certification for chemical, biological, radiological, and nuclear contaminants (CBRN). In the United States, they must be certified to resist permeation of chemical warfare agents, which may involve additional protective coverings; that gas or vapor will not pass through the filter before a specified amount of time; and its ability to fit a wide range of facial sizes and shapes.

Under immediately dangerous to life or health (IDLH) conditions, tight‐fitting full facepiece gas mask respirators with canisters (those with "14G approval") with CBRN approval may be used for escape, but loose‐fitting hoods and cartridges (those with "23C approval") with CBRN approval may not. Neither may be used to enter an IDLH atmosphere. The 23C CBRN PAPRs also must not be used if liquid droplet exposure occurs.

== See also ==
- Respirator assigned protection factors
- Workplace respirator testing
