= Respirator assigned protection factors =

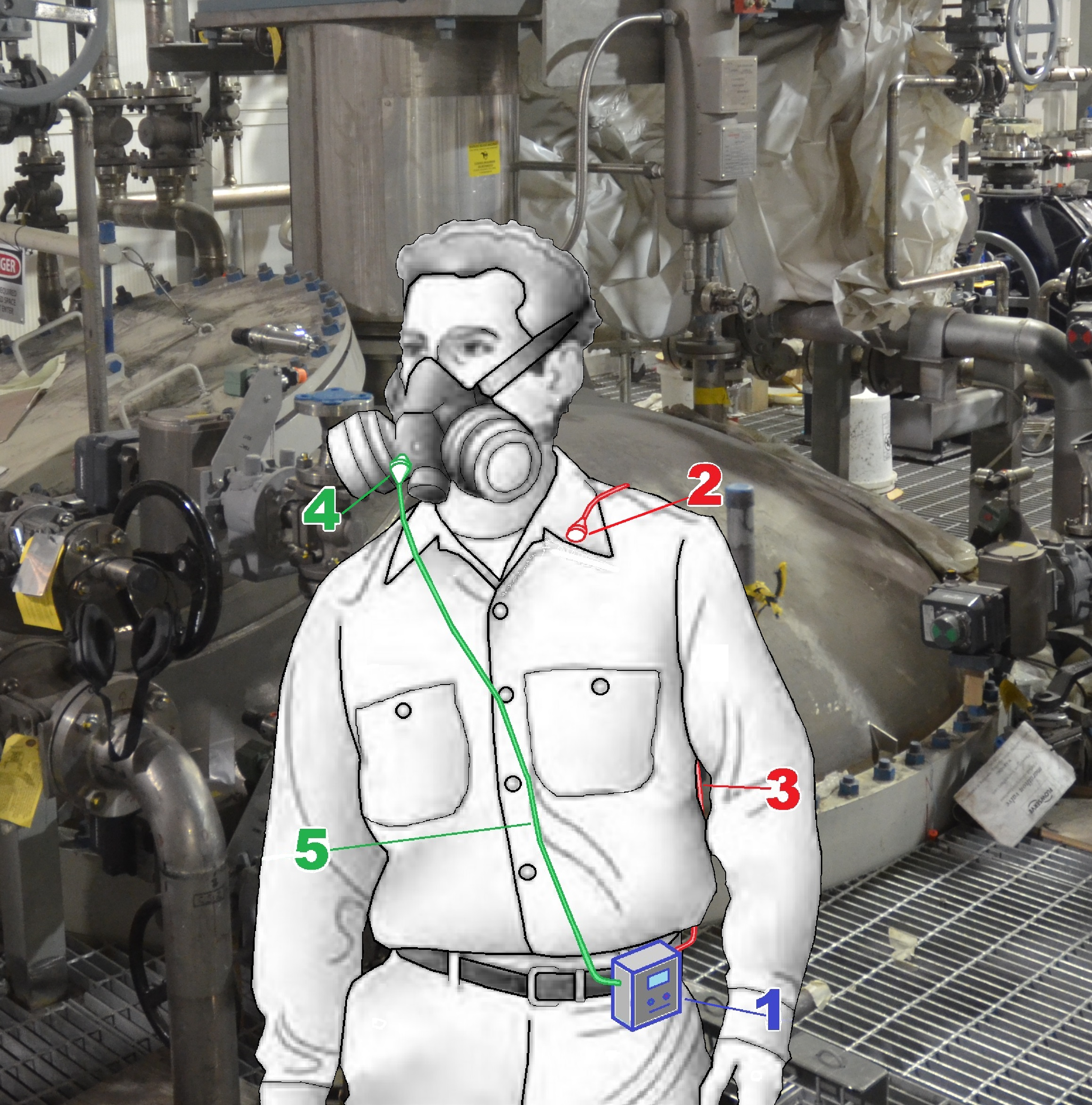
Example of measurement of efficiency of the respirator (in the workplace). Description: (1) personal sampling pump, (2) the cassette and the filter for determining the concentration (in the breathing zone), (3) the sampling line (from the breathing zone), (4) the cassette and the filter to determine the concentration (under a mask), and (5) the sampling line (from the mask).

The respiratory protective devices (RPD) can protect workers only if their protective properties are adequate to the conditions in the workplace. Therefore, specialists have developed criteria for the selection of proper, adequate respirators, including the Assigned Protection Factors (APF) - the decrease of the concentration of harmful substances in the inhaled air, which (is expected) to be provided with timely and proper use of a certified respirator of certain types (design) by taught and trained workers (after individual selection with a tight-fitting mask and fit testing), when the employer performs an effective respiratory protective device programme.

== Background ==
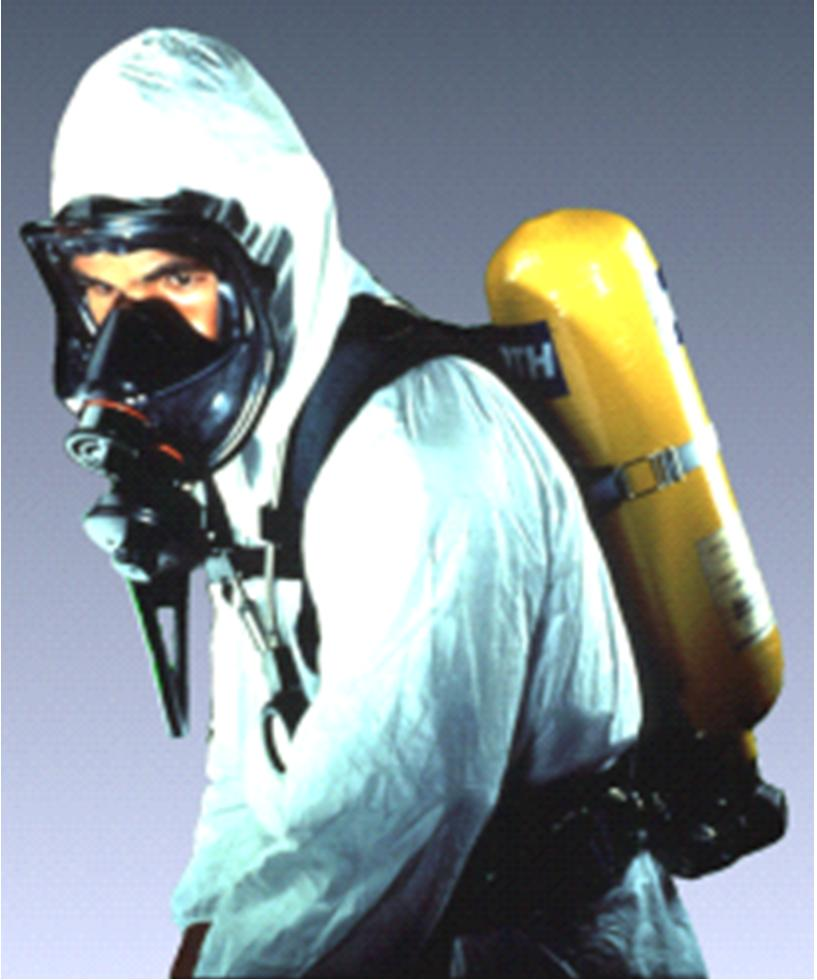
Self Containing Breathing Apparatus (SCBA) with pressure-demand air supply mode into the full face mask. This is the most reliable RPD type, its APF = 10 000

=== The different methods of protection from air pollution and their effectiveness ===
The imperfection of technological processes, machines and other equipment can lead to air contamination with harmful substances in the workplace. Protecting of the workers' health in this situation may be achieved by different means, listed below in order of decreasing of their effectiveness:

Hierarchy of hazard control
1.	The use of alternative substances which are less hazardous.
2.	The substitution of a given substance in a form that is less hazardous, e.g. replacing a fine powder by a coarser powder, pellets, or by a solution
3.	The substitution of a process by an alternative process likely to generate lower airborne concentrations of substances
4.	Total or partially enclosed process and handling systems
5.	Partial enclosure with local exhaust ventilation
6.	Local exhaust ventilation
7.	General ventilation
8.	Reducing period of exposure
9.	The introduction of appropriate working practices and systems of work, e.g. to close and store containers securely when not in use
10.	Use of monitors and warning devices to give a clear indication when unsafe airborne concentrations are present
11.	Good housekeeping
12.	Provision of a respiratory protective device program

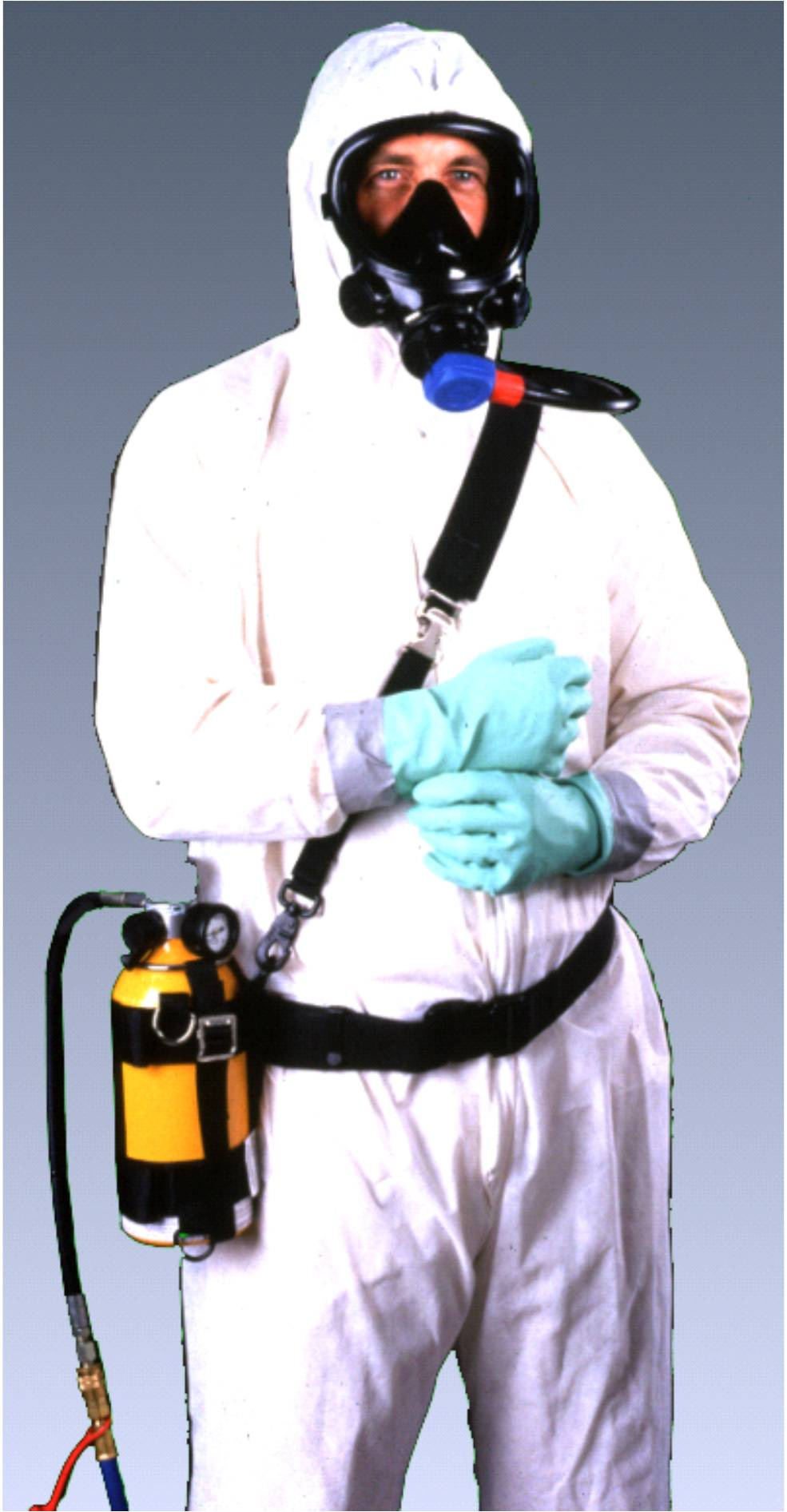
Supplied Air Respirator (SAR) with auxiliary breathing apparatus (for evacuation in case of possible supply disruptions of air through the hose) with pressure-demand air supply mode into the full face mask. This is one of the most reliable RPD type, its APF = 1000

If the use of these methods is impossible, or if their use did not reduce the concentration of harmful substances to a safe value, workers must use respirators. These respirators must be sufficiently effective, and they should correspond to known or expected conditions at the workplace. However, the sole reliance on personal protective equipment for personnel is considered the least effective means of controlling hazards, for reasons including: non-usage of the respirators in the contaminated atmosphere; leakage of unfiltered air through the gaps between the mask and face; and delayed replacement of gas cartridges.

=== The effectiveness of respirators with different designs ===
Different terms may be used to describe the protective properties of respirators:

- Penetration = (the concentration of harmful substances under mask) / (concentration outside the mask);
- Efficiency = ( (concentration outside the mask) - (the concentration of harmful substances under mask) ) / (concentration outside the mask) = 1 - Penetration;
- Protection Factor (PF) = (the concentration of harmful substances on the outside of the mask) / (concentration under mask) = 1 / Penetration.

The term "Protection Factor PF" has been used in the U.S., and the term "Penetration" was used in the soviet literature from the 1960s.

In the first half of the 20th century, experts measured protective properties of respirators in the laboratories. They used different control substances (argon, halogenated hydrocarbon vapour, aerosols of sodium chloride and oil mist, fluorophores, dioctyl phthalate, and others, and they measured their concentrations under the mask, and outside masks (simultaneously). The ratio of the measured concentrations is an indicator of the protective properties of different types of respirators. These measurements showed that if the efficiency of filters is sufficiently high, then the gaps between the mask and the face become the main way of penetration of air contamination under the mask, in the same way that on a cold day, a person wearing a warm jacket and pants will lose most of their heat through the head and extremities.

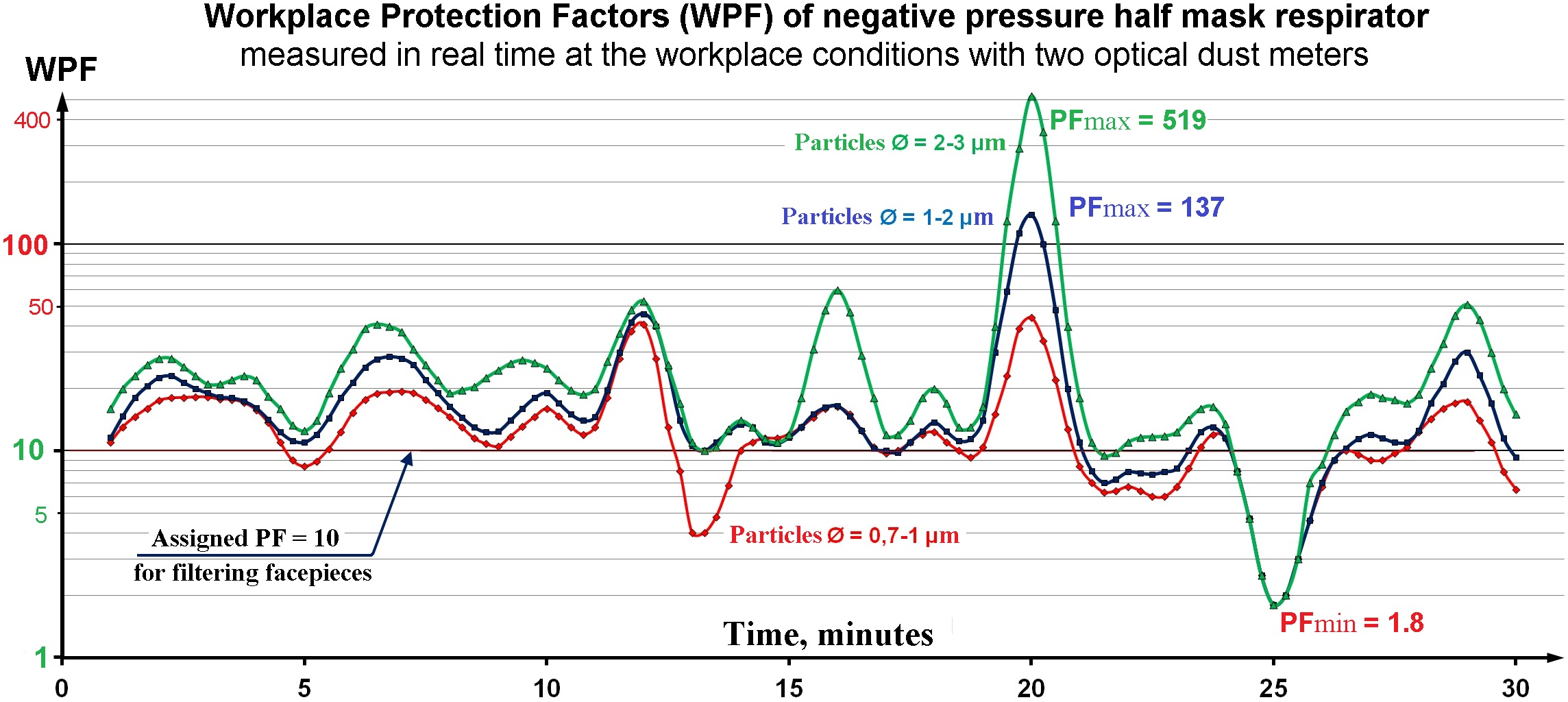
Workplace PF of filtering facepiece, measured in real time with two optical dust meters. In-facepiece dust concentration is changed dozens of times in a matter of minutes due to changes of the size of the gaps between the mask and face. Source

The shape and size of these gaps is not constant, and depends on many factors (the degree of fit the mask to the face - by shape and size; the correct donning the mask; the mask slippage on the face during the work due to execution of different movements; the design of the mask). The respirator's PF may change dozens of times over several minutes; and the two average PF (that were measured for the same worker in one day; for example - before and after the lunch break) can differ by more than 12 000 times.

Experts believed that the measurement of protection factors in the laboratory allows them to correctly evaluate, predict the RPD efficiency in the workplace conditions. But after the detection of cases of excessive harmful exposure on employees who used high quality respirators with HEPA particle filters in the nuclear industry of the US, the experts changed their opinion. Studies have been carried out to measure the protection factors for the various types of respirators - not only in the laboratories, but also at the workplaces. Dozens of such field studies have shown that the performance of serviceable respiratory protective equipment at the workplaces may be significantly less than in laboratory conditions. Therefore, the usage of laboratory results to assess the real efficiency is incorrect; and can lead to a wrong choice of such respirators that can not reliably protect workers.

=== Terminology to describe the different PF, and methods for APF development ===
The experts used the results of measurements at the laboratories and at the workplaces to develop more completely terminology for description of the respirators' performance; and this terminology has been applied officially, and in the preparation of research results for publication. Specialists began to use different terms to describe the protection factors, which were measured at workplaces with continuous use of respirators; and measured in the workplace when the workers used of respirators intermittently; measured not in the workplace while fit testing; measured in the laboratories under the simulation workplace's conditions; and for the protection factors, that can be expected (in most cases) when the workers properly used the respirators at the workplace.

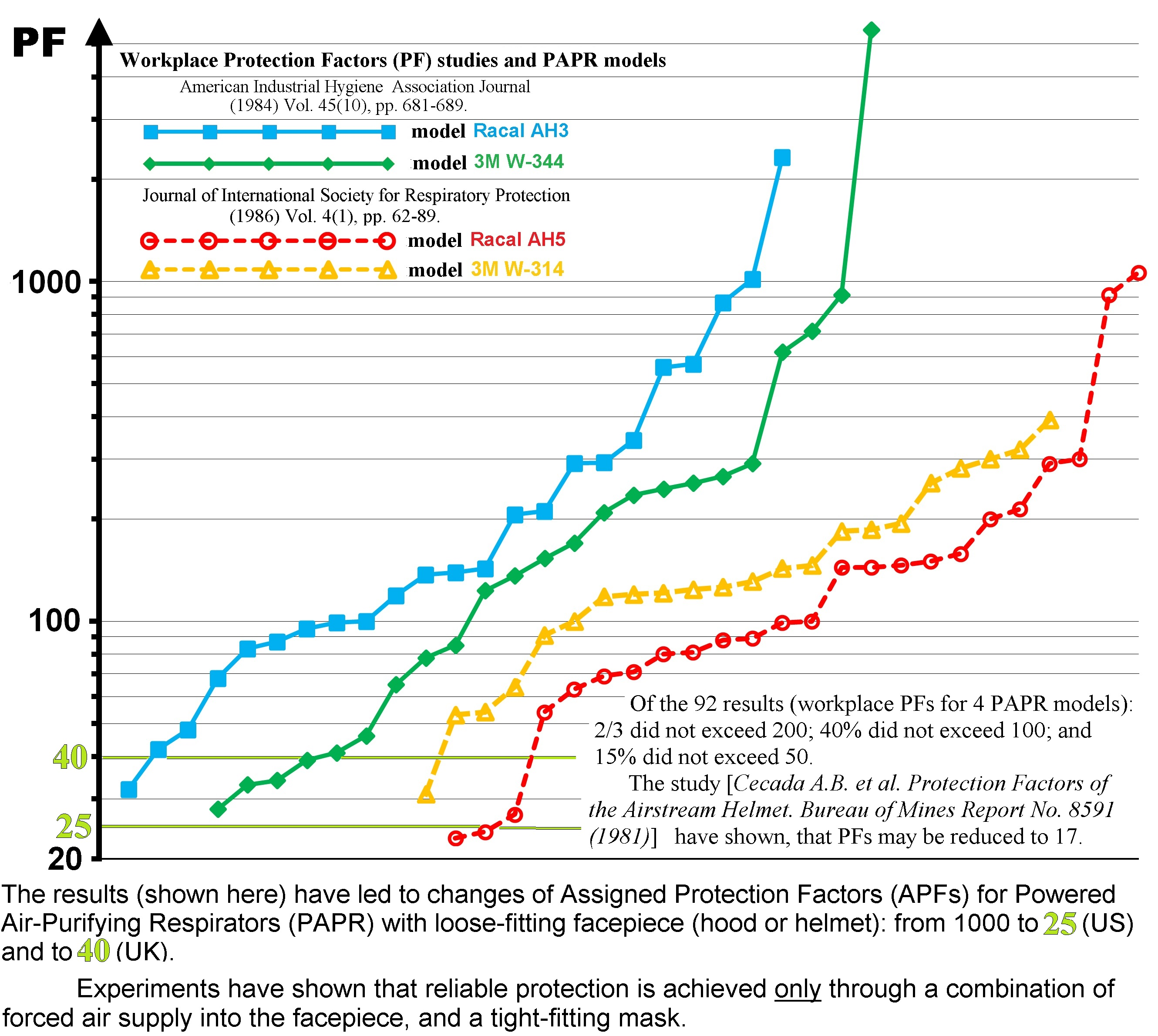
The diagram show 92 values of the Workplace PFs of PAPRs with loose-fitting facepieces (hood or helmet). After them, the Assigned Protection Factors of such PAPRs were reduced from 1000 to 25 (US) and to 40 (UK)

The modern terminology for RPD performance description (pp. 22–26)
Protection Factor	A description of the term
Assigned Protection Factor (APF)	The minimum anticipated protection provided by a properly functioning respirator or class of respirators to a given percentage of properly fitted and trained users.
Fit Factor	A quantitative measure of the fit of a specific respirator facepiece to a particular individual (FF are measured during fit test).
Simulated Workplace Protection Factor (SWPF)	A surrogate measure of the workplace protection provided by a respirator (SWPF are measured in laboratory conditions, that imitate real workplace conditions during "work")
Workplace Protection Factor (WPF)	A measure of the protection provided in the workplace only while the respirator was properly worn and used during normal work activities (WPF are measured at the workplaces, after fit testing; and without mask doffing during measurement).

A significant difference between respirator performance in the laboratories compared to the efficiency at the workplaces not allowed to use the laboratory results to predict the degree of protection offered in practice. And instability of respirators' protective properties (for the same RPD design, and in the same usage conditions) prevented evaluate their efficiency. For solving these problems, scientists Donald Campbell and Steven Lenhart suggested to use the results of measurements of Workplace PF values for development of Assigned (expected in practice) PF values (APF) - as the lower 95% confidence interval of WPF values. The results of measurements of WPF has been used in the development of APF by ANSI (for the recommended standard, that is not mandatory). The same was made during the development of the APF by OSHA (in the development of the standard, that is mandatory for the employer).

=== Development of APF values for the various respirator types ===
Results of measurements of WPF in the US and the UK became the basis for the development of APF for UK standard and for English version of EU standard. In some cases, there was no information on the effectiveness for respirators of specific design (type) in the workplace. This is due to the fact that the measurement of workplace PF is very difficult, time-consuming, and expensive work, which was carried out not very often. For these types of respirators experts used the results of WPF measurements of other types of respirators, which are similar. For example, the effectiveness of the Supplied Air Respirators (SARs, with hose) was considered similar to the efficiency of Powered Air Purifying Respirators (PAPRs), if they have the same facepieces and the same air supply mode. Finally, in the absence of this information, specialists could use the results of Simulated WPF measurements; or estimates of competent experts.

== Correction of Assigned PF values ==
Measurement of workplace protection factors surprisingly revealed the low efficiency of some designs of respirators, and that results have led to a sharp tightening of the requirements for application limits for respirators of such designs.

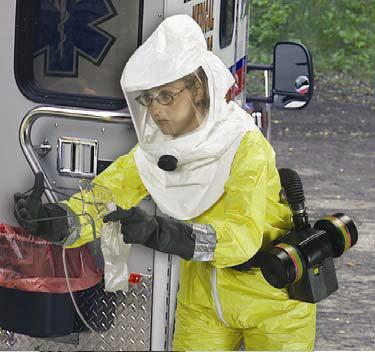
PAPR with hood. APF decreased from 1000 to 25 after PF studies in the workplaces

- PAPR with helmets or hoods

In a 1984 study by Myers et al., the WPF measurements for Powered Air Purifying Respirators (PAPRs) with helmets (that is not tight-fitted to the face) showed that the ingress of harmful substances in the inhaled air can be very high (PF = 28 and 42 for two models). This came as a surprise, since earlier studies in the laboratory showed that the flow of clean filtered air from the inside to the outside of the helmet prevents ingress of harmful substances under the helmet (PF > 1000). Additional studies, from 1986 and 1981, agreed with the result from the Myers et al. 1986 study: the minimum values of the workplace protection factors of two models of respirators were 31 and 23; and leakage of unfiltered air attained 16% in some cases in wind tunnel at 2 m/s air velocity

Therefore, the use of such RPD types was limited 25 PEL in the United States, and 40 OEL in the UK.

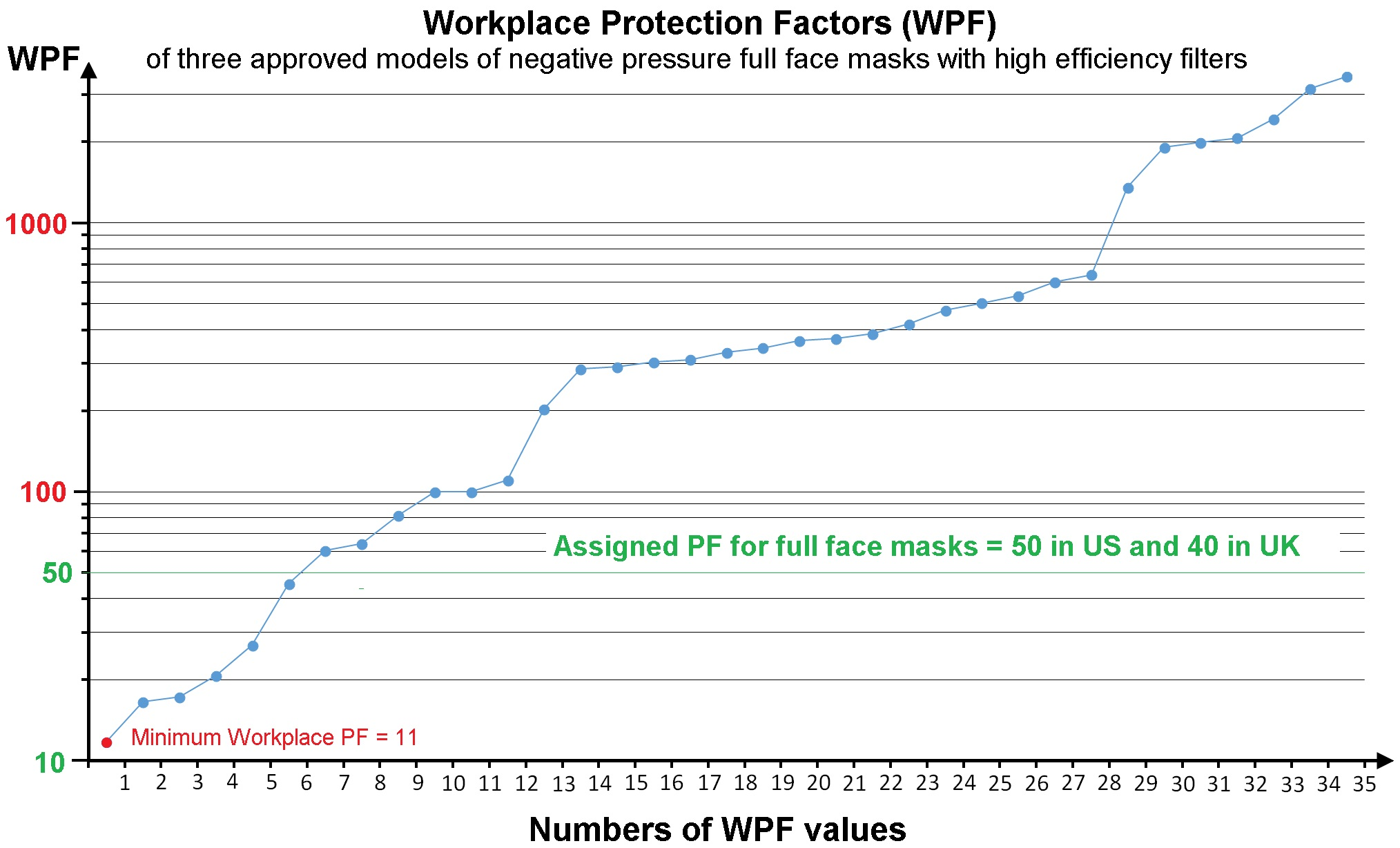
Results of respirator Workplace Protection Factors (WPF) measurement. Source

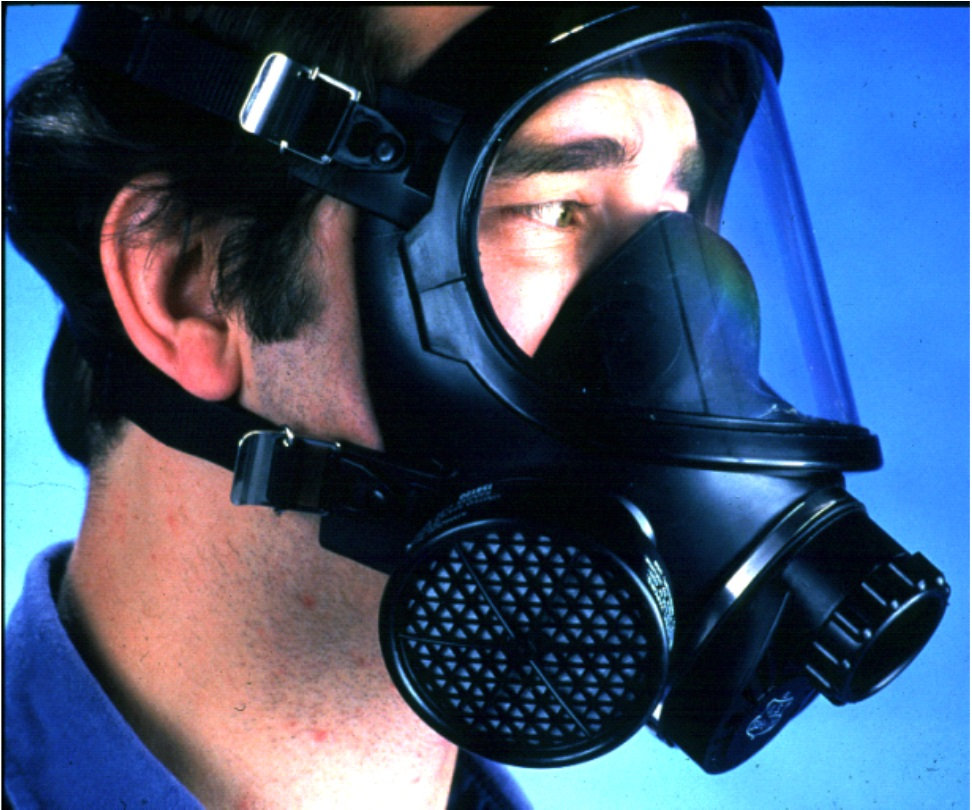
Negative pressure full face mask. APF decreased from 900 to 40 after PF studies in the workplace

- Negative pressure full face masks

Measurement of protection factors of negative pressure full face masks with high-efficiency filters in the laboratory revealed a risk of decrease in protective properties to a small values. Therefore, the use of such respirators has been limited to the values 50 or 100 PEL in the United States. However, the experts in the UK believed that the quality of their masks is higher than American masks, and were allowed to use up to 900 OEL. But the study showed that the value of the protection factor of > 900 has been achieved in practice infrequently. Minimum protection factors of 3 different models of full facepiece respirators were 11, 18 and 26. So, the new standards limit usage of these respirators up to 40 OEL in UK (after this study).

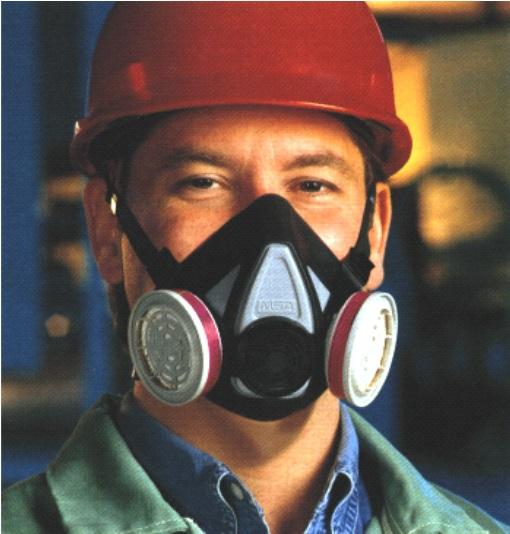
Negative pressure half mask, possible APF decreased from 100 to 10

- Negative pressure half mask respirators (after fit testing)

Fit testing of tight-fitting masks of negative-pressure respirators became widely used in US industry in 1980-s. At the beginning, it was thought that the half-mask fit quite well to the worker's face, if during a fit test the protection factor (fit factor) is not less than 10 (later, experts began to use "safety factor" = 10 during the fit test; threshold fit factor become 10 × 10 = 100). The widespread use of fit testing in the industry gives professionals optimism, and they allowed to the employers restrict the use of half mask respirators in accordance with the values of worker's personal fit factor (the maximum concentration of pollutants = personal Fit Factor × PEL), but not more than 100 × PEL. However, scientific studies have shown that although such test increases the effectiveness of protection, the risk of leakage of large amounts of unfiltered air is maintained. Furthermore, the studies have shown that non-filtered air under the mask is not uniformly mixed with the filtered air, which leads to large errors in the measurement of the in-facepiece concentration of contaminants, and subsequent calculations of fit factors - the latter is often much smaller than the "measured" value. So, specialists recommend not allowed usage negative pressure half mask respirators then harmful substances' concentrations exceeds 10 PEL. Therefore, OSHA standards require to restrict using of half-mask negative-pressure respirators up to 10 PEL after obtaining fit factor greater than or equal to 100 during the mask selection for the worker (they used a safety factor = 10).

== US Assigned PF values ==
Air-purifying respirators cannot be used in oxygen-deficient atmospheres (less than 19.5% oxygen). Nor can they be used in atmospheres with a contaminant concentration that may be immediately dangerous to life or health, or in unknown atmospheres. In these cases air-supplying respirators must be used. If concentrations of hazardous particulates or gasses that are greater than the occupational exposure limit, U.S. regulations require that respirators be worn, but they may also be worn at lower concentrations. Similar mandatory legal requirements apply to employers in many other countries (examples). The respirator must have a sufficient assigned protection factor (APF) for the conditions.

Respirators are rated by APF; higher APFs protect more
Type	APF	protects from
Disposable filtering facepiece respirators	10-30	particulates only
Half-mask elastomeric respirators	10-30	both particulates and gasses
Full-face-mask elastomeric respirators	50	both particulates and gasses
Loose-hood PAPRs	25 or 50	both particulates and gasses
Elastomeric PAPRs	1000	both particulates and gasses
Supplied-air respirators (SARs)	10-2000	both particulates and gasses
Self-contained breathing apparatus (SCBAs)	50-10 000	both particulates and gasses

Elastomeric masks may fail to protect if they are not donned before entering a hazardous environment. Other problems include using a size other than the size the wearer was fit-tested on, using the wrong sort of cartridge, re-using a cartridge that is no longer good, not doing a positive- and negative-pressure seal check each time the mask is donned, failing to test the respirator (and perhaps inhaling the carbon from a broken cartridge), and even putting the nose-clip up the nose rather than using it to pinch the nose shut.

== Comparison of APF in the US and the UK ==
The table lists the APF values for the most common respirator types (for US and UK).

The Assigned Protection Factors for some main (equivalent) RPD types (developed on the basis of results of Workplace Protection Factors studies)
RPD type in US	APF in US	RPD type in UK	APF in UK
N95 negative pressure air-purifying half mask respirators (filtering facepieces or elastomeric)	10	FFP2 filtering facepieces or elastomeric half masks with P2 filters	10
N99 or N100 negative pressure air-purifying half mask respirators (filtering facepieces or elastomeric)	10	FFP3 filtering facepieces or elastomeric half masks with P3 filters	20
Negative pressure air-purifying respirators with full facepieces with P100 filters	50	Negative pressure air-purifying respirators with full facepieces with P3 filters	40
Powered Air-Purifying Respirators (PAPRs) with loose-fitting hood or helmet, and P100 filters	25	PAPRs with loose-fitting hood or helmet, and P3 filters	TH1 or TM1 10 TH2 or TM2 20 TH3 or TM3 40
Supplied Air Respirators (SARs) or Self Contained Breathing Apparatus (SCBA) with full mask and air supply on demand	50	SARs or SCBAs with full face mask and negative pressure demand air supply	40
SARs with full mask and pressure demand air supply	1 000	SARs with full face mask and positive pressure demand air supply	2 000
SCBAs with full mask and pressure demand air supply	10 000	SCBAs with full face mask and positive pressure demand air supply	2 000

US particle filters N95 are similar to P2; and P100 (HEPA) are similar to P3; filtering materials in US N95 filtering facepieces are similar to FFP2. However, in the UK and Europe any tight fitting half mask/full face mask is required to have a second check based on total inward leakage (TIL) which cannot exceed 8% for FFP2 and 2% for FFP3

The difference of the APF for air purifying negative pressure full-facepiece masks are not large. The difference between PAPR with helmets a few more. But measurements showed that the real effectiveness of RPD (at the workplace conditions) is strongly dependent on the conditions of their use, not only from the design, and this partly explains the difference in APF values. The APF for negative pressure half mask respirators are twofold. But this difference cannot be considered separately from recommendations for use of respirators. The use of half-face masks in the US is limited to 10 PEL for the "worst case" - work in the polluted atmosphere of 8 hours per day, 40 hours a week. But British experts took into account large experience of the use of negative pressure air purifying RPDs, and they concluded that to achieve continuous wear respirator 8 hours a day is impossible (because of the negative impact on the health of workers). For this reason, they recommend to the employer to give the job to the workers so that they work in the polluted atmosphere not during entire shift, but only a part of the shift. The remaining time the employee needs to work in a non-polluted atmosphere (without the respirator). The fact that the employee is in a non-polluted atmosphere some part of working time provide additional protection of his health, and therefore, the requirements to the efficiency of the respirator may be less stringent.

The development of the Assigned PF in the United States and Britain were based on measurements of the effectiveness of respirators in the workplace (after statistical processing). Also used opinions of experts, based on the similarity of the respirators with different designs (for example, powered air purifying filtering respirators (PAPR), and a similar supplied air respirators SAR) - provided that the mode and the quantity of air supply, and the facepieces (masks) were the same. Experts in the two countries often used the results of the same studies of WPF (because of their limited number). For example, British standard had been developed with usage of results of 1897 WPF measurements during 31 studies; and 23 of this 31 studies had been conducted in United States.

Therefore, the values of the assigned PF in the US and in the UK are evidence-based; and they are very similar to each other.

== The values of the APF in EU and other countries ==
Studies of respirator's performance was carried out not very often, and almost all of these studies were conducted in USA (and UK). It is possible that the lack of information about the RPD efficiency in the workplaces, was the reason behind developing these assigned PF in several European countries, whose values differ significantly from the evidence-based values of APFs in the US and UK.

The Assigned Protection Factors for some main RPD types, developed in several EU countries
RPD type	APF in several EU countries			
RPD type	Finland	Germany	Italy	Sweden
FFP2 filtering facepices	10	10	10	10
Elastomeric half masks with P2 filters	10	10	10	10
FFP3 filtering facepices	20	30	30	20
Elastomeric half masks with P3 filters	-	30	30	-
Negative pressure air-purifying respirators with full face mask and P2 filters	15	15	15	15
Negative pressure air-purifying respirators with full face mask and P3 filters	500	400	400	500
Powered Air-Purifying Respirators (PAPRs) with loose-fitting hood or helmet, and THP3 filters	200	100	200	200
PAPRs with full face mask, and TMP3 filters	1000	500	400	1000
SARs with full facepiece and negative pressure demand air supply	500	1000	400	500
Supplied Air Respirators (SARs) with full facepiece and positive pressure demand air supply	1000	1000	400	1000
SCBAs with full facepiece and positive pressure demand air supply	-	≥ 1000	1000	-

Most European countries (except UK) did not conduct very complex and expensive studies on the effectiveness of respirators in the workplaces, or spent very little of such research. Therefore, it may be that some countries do not take full account of results of foreign researches (that showed a significant difference between the effectiveness of respirators in a laboratory environment; and in applying them in the workplaces). For example, after the study in 1990, the APF value of negative pressure full face masks was reduced from 900 to 40 (1997) in UK. But in other countries, similar research was not carried out; and a similar decrease did not occur.

The study showed that the three models of full face masks had a significant leakage of unfiltered air through the gaps between the mask and the face. The minimum values of the workplace protection factors (WPF) of each of the three negative pressure full face mask models were 11, 17 and 26. The maximum value of the WPF from one of the models did not exceed 500 no times at all. And for all results together, the WPF was not more than 100 in ~ 30% of the measurements. So, for this reason, the values of the APFs for this RPD type in Germany (400), Finland (500), Italy (400), and Sweden (500), may not fully take into account the lower this type respirators' performance at the workplace compared to the performance in the laboratory (during certification). The same was true for other RPD types and their APF.

State standard in India points to the need to use the workplace protection factors for restricting the permissible use of respirators, but does not set any values of the APFs. The standard also recommends the use of those PFs, which are obtained during the certification (in the laboratories, but not at workplaces). These values greatly exceed the values used in the US and in the UK.

The Ukrainian version of the EU standard EN 529 does not set any values of the APFs for the selection of respirator in this country. This document only listed the values of APFs in several European countries (for reference); and declares the inadmissibility of the use of laboratory efficiency for predicting the protective properties at the workplace.

The APFs are not developed in RF, in South Korea, as well as in many other countries, and selection of respirators is not regulated by its national legislation. This contributes to errors, and the usage of such respirator's types, which are not able to reliably protect the workers due to its design (even at high quality of specific certified models).

The Assigned Protection Factors^{1} for different RPD types in several countries
Facepiece type по лицевой части	Country										Minimum values, measured at the workplaces^{4}
Facepiece type по лицевой части	USA	United Kingdom	Australia	Canada	China	Japan	South Korea^{2}	France^{3}	Germany^{3}	RF^{2}	Minimum values, measured at the workplaces^{4}
Negative pressure respirators (without forced air supply into the mask)
Half mask	10	20	10	10	10	10	10	20	30	50	2,3; 2,5 ...
Full face mask	50	40	100	100	100	50	100	40	400	2 000	11; 17 ...
Powered air purifying respirators (with forced air supply into the facepiece)
Half mask	50	40	-	50	50	50	50	40	500		16; 19 ...
Full face mask	1000	40	>100	1000	1000	100	200	40	500		5; 12 ...
Hood or helmet	25/1000^{4}	40	>100	1000	25/1000	25	200	40	100		23; 24 ...
Supplied air respirators (with forsed air supply into the facepiece)
Half mask	1000	-	50	50	50	50	50	200	100		-
Full face mask	2 000	2 000	>100	1000	1000	1000	1000	~ 250	1000		-
Hood or helmet	25/1000^{5}	40	>100	1000	25/1000	25	1000	100	-		-
Self-contained breathing apparatus with full facepiece mask	10 000	2 000	>100	>1000	>1000	5 000	2 000	Maximum	>1000		-
1 - The APF values in the table are the maximum values for the selected RPD type, that is: 1.1. The air purifying respirators (negative pressure; and powered PAPR) - with high efficiency filters (>99.95%); 1.2. The supplied air respirators - with positive pressure demand air supply to the masks; and with continuous flow air supply to the helmets or hoods. 2 The APF for South Korea and RF are not mandatory, but recommended values only. 3 - There is no information that would show that the values of these APFs were developed so that the difference in efficiency at the workplaces and in the laboratories is taken into account to the full extent (as in the US and UK). 4 - For reference: there are the minimum values of the protection factors, measured in the workplace during work in the last column of the table. 5 - APF = 25 for all approved PAPR; and APF = 1000 only for those approved respirators, that have been further tested in the workplace and there have shown high performance (WPF > 1000).

== The use of the APFs when selecting respirators for known workplace conditions ==
US law obliges the employer to accurately measure air pollution at workplaces. The results of such measurements are used to assess whether short-term inhalation of harmful substances may lead to irreversible and significant deterioration of health, or death (IDLH concentrations). If concentrations exceed the IDLH, the standard allows the use of only the most reliable respirators - SAR or self-contained breathing apparatus: with pressure-demand air supply in the full facepiece mask ( §(d)(2)).

If the concentration of a harmful substance is less than the IDLH, the coefficient of air pollution for the harmful substance (Hazard Factor) is determined, which is equal to the ratio of this concentration to the PEL (TLV, OEL) for the harmful substance. The APF of the selected respirator type must equal or exceed the Hazard Factor.

If there are several harmful substances in the workplace air, then the selected respirator must meet the following requirement:

C_{1}/(APF×PEL_{1}) + C_{2}/(APF×PEL_{2} ) + C_{3}/(APF×PEL_{3} ) + ... + Cn/(APF×PELn) ≤ 1

where C_{1}, C_{2} ... and Cn are the concentrations of harmful substances number 1, 2 ... n; and PEL is the maximum allowable concentration for corresponding harmful substances in the breathing zone.

If this requirement is not met, the employer needs to choose a different type of respirator, which has a greater APF value.

In all cases, if they employer selects a respirator with tight-fitting facepiece (full face mask, elastomeric half-mask or quarter-mask, or filtering facepiece respirator), all employee must be fit tested (to prevent the leakage of unfiltered polluted air through gaps between their faces and the tight-fitting masks, which may not match to their faces). Appendix A provides a detailed description of this testing.

Values of IDLH concentrations and detailed recommendations for the selection of respirators (and self-rescuers) are available in the NIOSH directory.

== International standard for RPD selection and usage ==
ISO is developing two international standards that govern the certification of respirators; and their selection and application

The standards governing the selection of respirators use the APF value. But HSE specialists critique these documents, noting these standards are set to values of APF that differ from those established in the US and the UK; and these values are set not for a specific RPD type but rather for any RPD that meets approval requirements:

New ISO RPD classification and APF
ISO RPD type	ISO requirements for approval	Protection level
PC6	TIL < 0.001%	10 000
PC5	TIL < 0.01%	2000
PC4	TIL < 0.1%	250
PC3	TIL < 1%	30
PC2	TIL < 5%	10
PC1	TIL < 20%	4

The report concluded that new ISO standards set insufficiently high APF values and recommended that these values should not be used in practice, and to continue work on APF justification for the different types of respirators.

== See also ==
- Immediately dangerous to life or health
- Permissible exposure limit
- Respirators testing in the workplaces
