= Racal (disambiguation) =

Racal is a British electronics company.

Racal may also refer to:

== People ==
- Maris Racal (born 1997), Filipina actress and singer-songwriter
- Kevin Racal (born 1991), Filipino professional basketball player

== Other uses ==
- Racal suit, a protective suit with powered air-purifying respirator
