= Workplace respirator testing =

Testing of respirators in real life conditions

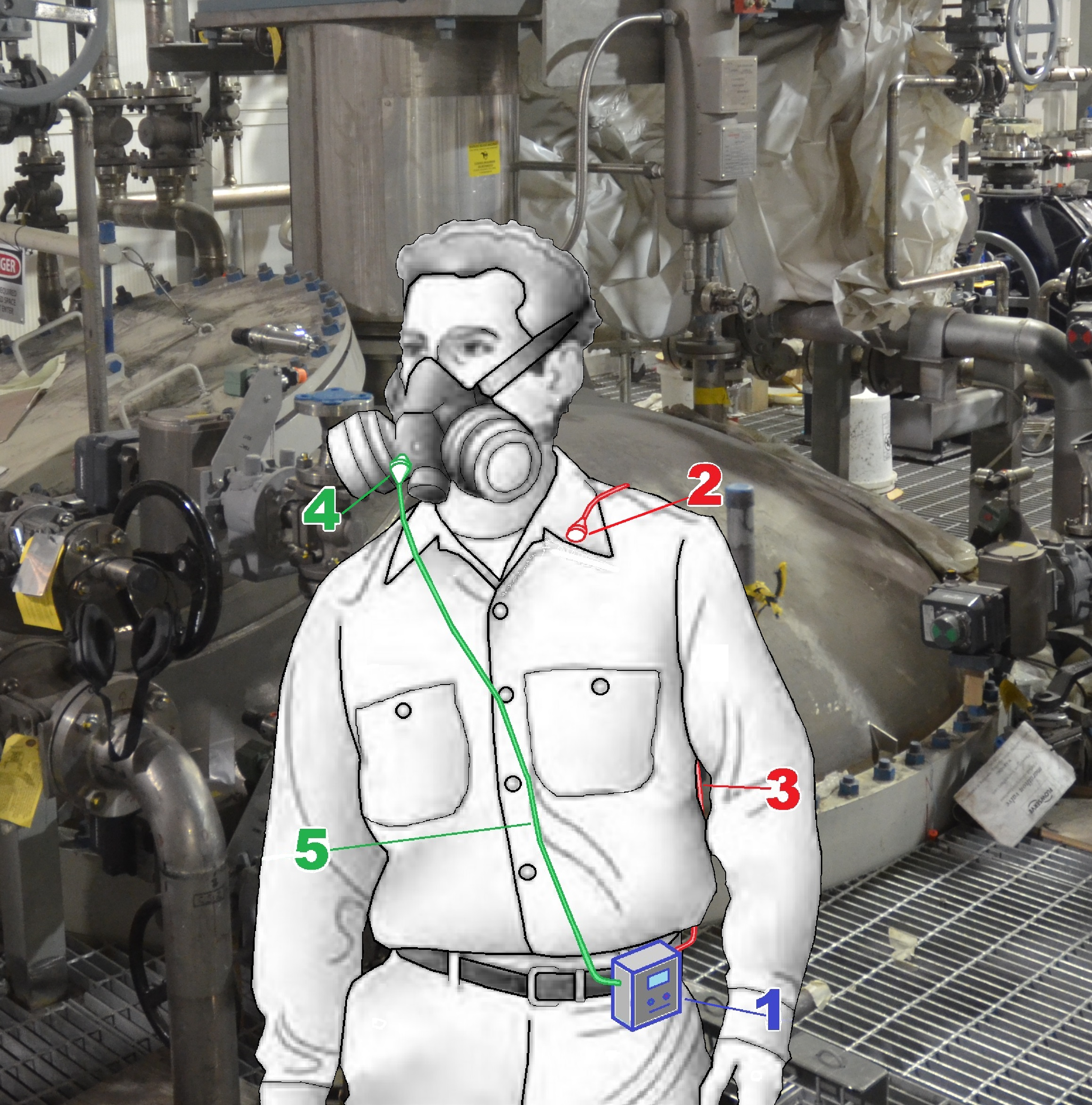
Example of measurement of efficiency of the respirator (in the workplace). Description: (1) personal sampling pump, (2) the cassette and the filter for determining the concentration (in the breathing zone), (3) the sampling line (from the breathing zone), (4) the cassette and the filter to determine the concentration (under a mask), and (5) the sampling line (from the mask).

Respirators, also known as respiratory protective equipment (RPE) or respiratory protective devices (RPD), are used in some workplaces to protect workers from air contaminants. Initially, respirator effectiveness was tested in laboratories, but in the late 1960s it was found that these tests gave misleading results regarding the level of protection provided. In the 1970s, workplace-based respirator testing became routine in industrialized countries, leading to a dramatic reduction in the claimed efficacy of many respirator types and new guidelines on how to select the appropriate respirator for a given environment.

== Background ==
A video describing respirator certification

The invention of the first personal sampling pump in 1958 made it possible to simultaneously measure the concentrations of air pollution outside and inside a respirator mask. This was the first attempt to measure the effectiveness of respiratory protective equipment. Until the 1970s experts mistakenly believed that the protective properties of a respirator in the laboratory were not significantly different from its properties in the workplace. There were therefore no measurements of the effectiveness of respirators under production conditions, and the regions where different types of respirators could be safely used were established on the basis of laboratory tests only.

This picture began to change when it was realized in the 1960s that workers using approved respirators were still being exposed to high levels of harmful contaminants. Workplace studies have since shown that the effectiveness of respirators of all designs is much lower in real-world tests than in the laboratory. Under workplace conditions, employees must perform a variety of movements that testers in the lab do not. When the facepiece of the respirator is tightly fitted, these movements cause gaps to form between the mask and the face, decreasing the efficiency of the mask due to leakage of unfiltered air through the gaps. In addition, a small number of testers can not simulate all the variety of shapes and sizes of faces, and a 20-minute certification lab test cannot simulate all the variety of movements performed in workplaces. Testers may also be more careful about putting on and using their masks than an ordinary worker.

== Evolution of workplace-based testing standards ==
=== Initial workplace-based tests of effectiveness in the 1970s and 1980s ===
A groundbreaking study in 1974 on the effectiveness of respirators used by miners simultaneously measured dust concentrations with personal samplers worn by individual miners, and using two dust collectors, without the mask. The researchers also measured the percentage of time that the miners used their respirators by attaching two thermistors to each miner (one in the facepiece, the other on the belt). Heat detection in the expired air was a sign of wearing a mask. The study defined a new measure, the "effective protection factor", that described the protection offered under real-world conditions, and reported the range of effective protection factors in four different mines.

In the steel fabrication industry, individuals performing sandblasting wore various types of hoods, usually supplied with air. Studies in 1975 found that the concentration of dust under these hoods exceeded the maximum permissible value, although air-supplied hoods offered better protection than non-air-supplied hoods. Even when sandblasting was not occurring, the level of silica dust in the atmosphere far exceeded safe levels, meaning that time workers spent outside the hood on breaks led to exposure.

In copper smelters, three commonly used types of negative pressure filtering respirators with elastomeric half-masks were examined for their ability to protect workers against concentrations of sulfur dioxide in 1976. The different respirator designs showed large variations in protectiveness, partially attributable to the comfort of the respirator design: the more comfortable masks were adjusted more tightly and were therefore more effective.

A 1979 study of the effectiveness of self-contained breathing apparatus (SCBA) in protecting firefighters against inhalation of carbon monoxide showed that intermittent usage of these respirators made them ineffective. Even continuous usage of SCBAs did not provide complete protection. This SCBA design had an air supply into the mask that supplied air "on-demand" (i.e. allowing negative pressure under the mask during inhalation). US and EU legislation now requires the use of breathing apparatus with the "pressure-demand" mode of air supply (i.e. with positive pressure under the mask during inhalation) for firefighters.

Studies also found that worker-to-worker variation in the use of respirators can have very large effects on the protection achieved. A 1980 study on inhalation exposure of cadmium workers identified a single worker who always used his respirator correctly. The protection factor for this worker was found to be 26 times higher than that for the average worker. In a study in coal mines, miners frequently removed their respirators in conditions where they perceived the dust level to be low, greatly reducing efficacy. In another study, respirators with an expected protection factor of 1000 in fact had protection factors ranging from 15 to 216. Factors affecting the level of protection achieved include the snugness of the fit of the respirator to the worker's face, and air movement in the environment.

=== New measures of efficacy ===
As researchers repeatedly found that the level of protection actually experienced in the workplace was much lower than the protection factors assigned to the devices after laboratory testing, it was proposed that a new expected protection factor scale should be developed, such that the real effectiveness was higher than the "expected effectiveness" with a probability of at least 90%.

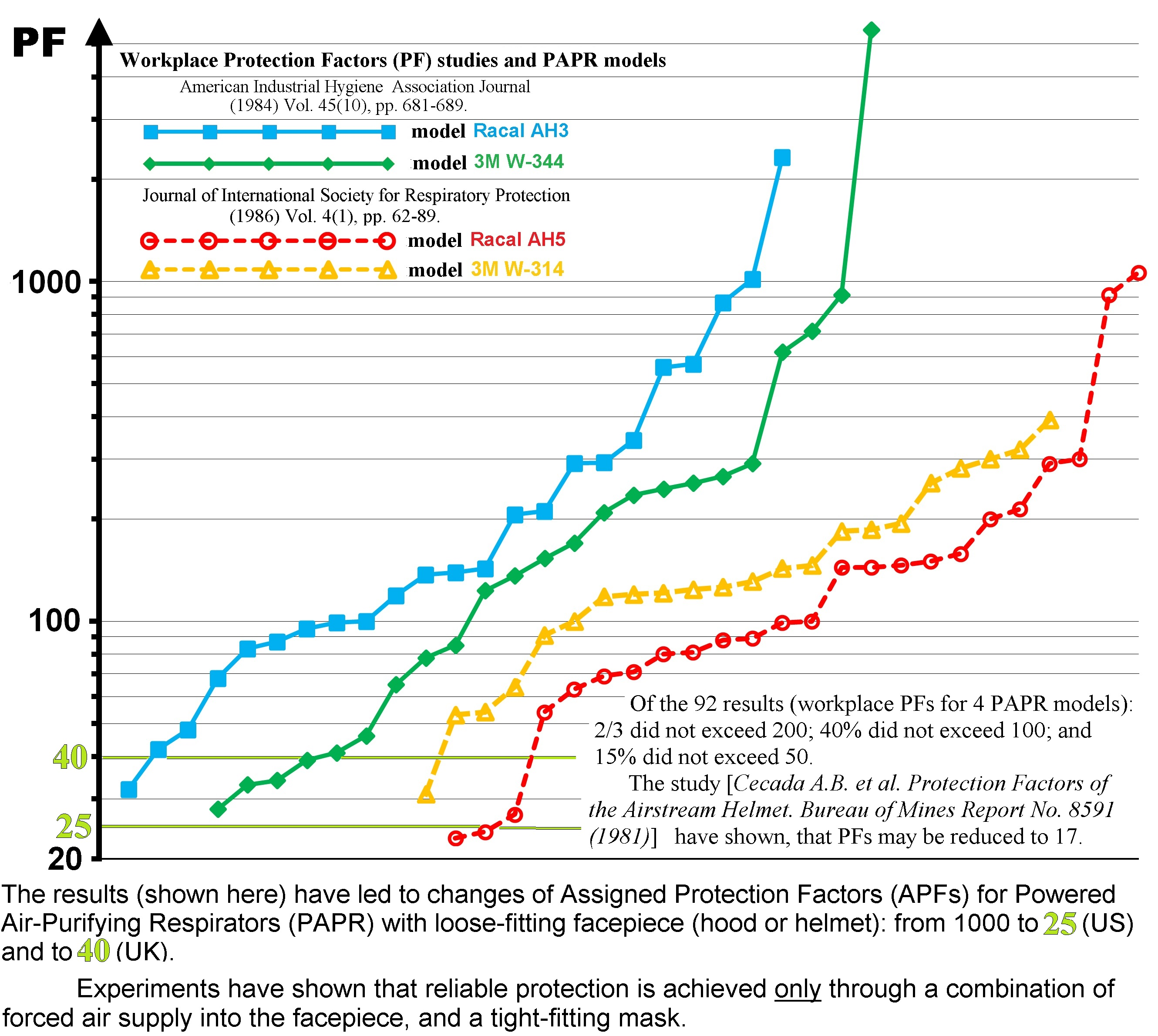
Protection factors (PFs) of powered air-purifying respirators (PAPRs) with loose-fitting facepiece (hood or helmet). These data led to the assigned PF being lowered from 1000 to 25 PEL (USA), and from 1000 to 40 OEL (UK)

The significant differences between real and laboratory-measured effectiveness prompted the National Institute for Occupational Safety and Health (NIOSH) to release two informational messages on respirators in 1982, warning consumers about the unexpectedly low effectiveness of respirators. After extensive discussion, six new definitions of respirator protection factors were agreed upon. For example, the assigned protection factor (APF) of a respirator is the minimum protection factor the respirator must provide under the following circumstances: the respirator will be used by trained and taught workers, after individual selection of masks to fit the face of an employee, and will be used without interruption in the polluted atmosphere. The actual protection experienced by a worker may be significantly lower than this and protection may vary from worker to worker.

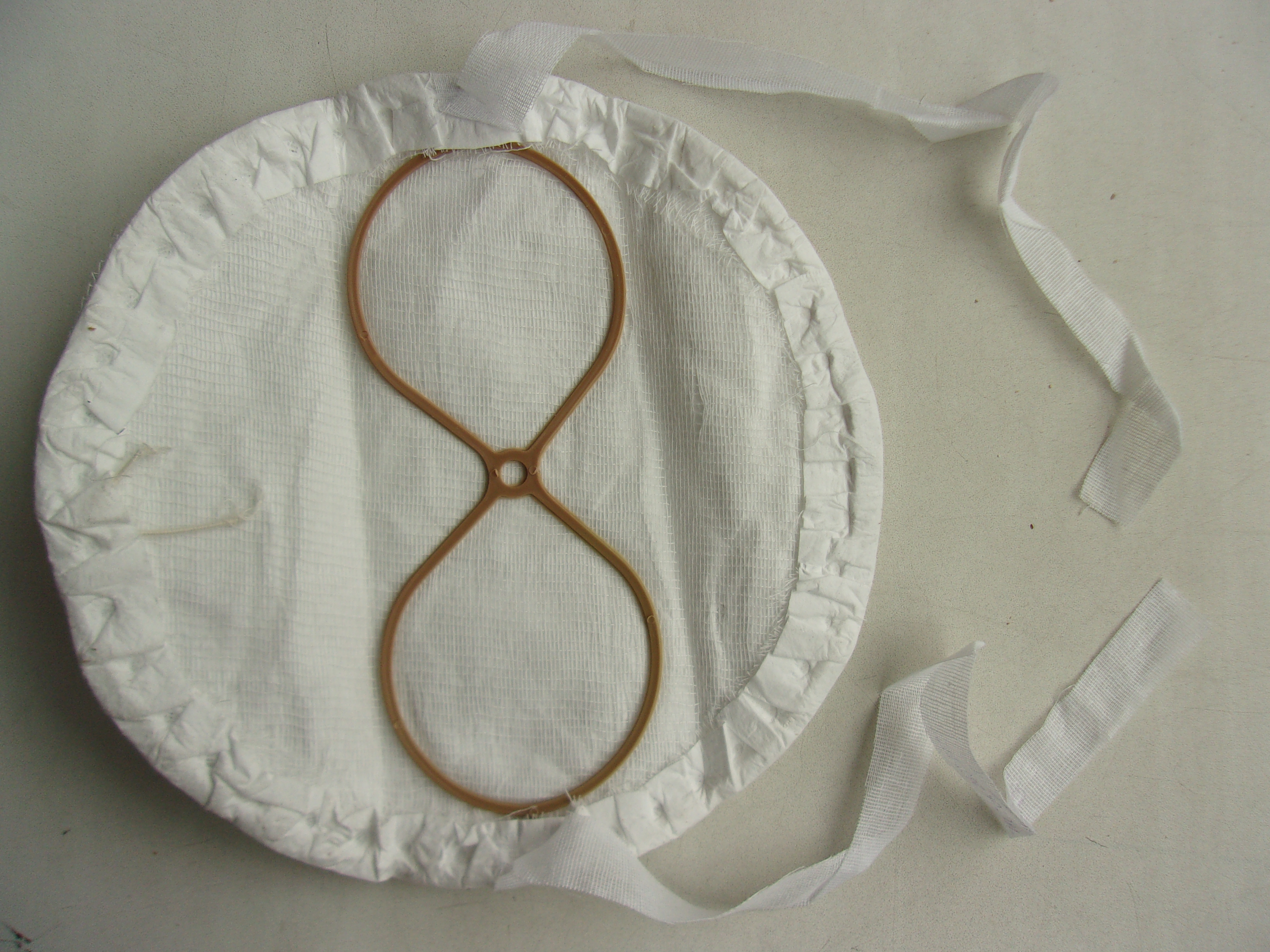
The Lepestok filtering half-mask, viewed from the inner side of the semi-finished product. The effectiveness of this filtering facepiece was overestimated by orders of magnitude. For the period 1956 to 2015, over 6 billion respirators were produced.

=== Respirator efficacy at Chernobyl ===
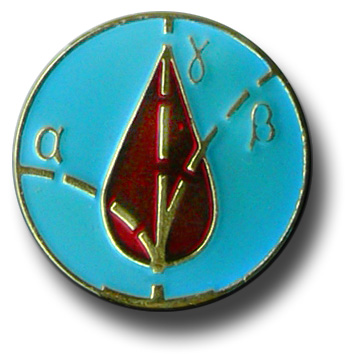
The central detail of the Liquidators' medal, with traces of alpha (α) and beta (β) particles and gamma (γ) rays over a drop of blood.

The Chernobyl nuclear accident in 1986 led to an urgent need for protection of workers from radioactive aerosols. Approximately 300,000 negative pressure filtering facepieces of the model "Lepestok" were sent to Chernobyl in June 1986. These respirators were considered to be very effective (the declared protection factor for the most common model was 200). However, the individuals who used these respirators were exposed to excessive contamination. Just as in the case of the studies noted above, the declared protection factor was very different from the actual protection factor under real-world conditions. As seen in other workplace tests, the passage of unfiltered air through the gap between the mask and face undermined the efficiency of the respirator. However, these discoveries did not lead to a change in assessments of the effectiveness of respirators in the USSR.

=== Alternatives to respirator use ===
Workplace-based testing has led to extensively revised standards for the use of different designs of respirators, and has forced manufacturers to pay more attention to methods of hazard reduction such as sealing, ventilation, and automation, and to improvements in technology. For example, the National Institute for Occupational Safety and Health (USA) has provided recommendations for reducing dust concentrations in coal mines and other mines. Field measurements showed that respirators are the least reliable means of protection, with unstable and unpredictable efficacy.

Respirators are not convenient; they create discomfort and inhibit communication. The reduction of the field of view due to respirator use leads to an increase in the risk of accidents. Respirators also reinforce overheating at high air temperature. In real-world conditions, these deficiencies often lead to workers removing their respirators periodically, further reducing the efficacy of the respirator. In addition, respirators only protect workers against harmful substances entering the body through the respiratory system, whereas pollutants frequently also enter the body through the skin. Respirators thus cannot be used as substitutes for other measures that reduce the impact of air pollution on workers. However, if the respiratory system is the main way that harmful substances enter the body, and if other means of protection do not reduce the impact to an acceptable value, respirators may be a useful supplement. To maximize effectiveness, the type of respirator should be selected for the specific situation, masks should be chosen for employees personally, and workers should be trained to use the respirator effectively.

== Reduction in permissible exposure limits ==
Legislation in industrialized countries establishes limitations on the use of all types of respirators, taking into account the results of field trials of efficacy. The permissible exposure limit [PEL] for several types of respirators was reduced. For example, for negative pressure air-purifying respirators with full face mask and high-efficiency filters, the limits were reduced from 500 PEL to 50 PEL (USA), and from 900 OEL to 40 OEL (UK); for powered air-purifying respirators with a loose-fitting facepiece (hood or helmet), limits were reduced from 1000 PEL to 25 PEL (USA); for powered air-purifying respirators with half mask, limits were reduced from 500 PEL to 50 PEL (USA); for supplied air respirators with full face mask and continuous air supply mode, limits were reduced from 100 OEL to 40 OEL (UK); for self-contained breathing apparatus respirators with air supply on demand, limits were reduced from 100 PEL to 50 PEL (USA). Filtering facepieces and negative pressure half-mask respirators were limited to 10 PEL in the USA.

Table. Requirements for protection factors for different types of respirators before and after workplace testing
Respirator type, country	Requirements for protection factor for certification (2013)	Permissible exposure limits prior to workplace testing (year)	Permissible exposure limits after workplace testing (2013)	Minimum values of measured workplace protection factors
PAPR with helmet, USA	> 250 000	up to 1000 PEL	up to 25 PEL	28, 42 ...
Negative pressure air-purifying respirator with full face mask, USA	> 250 000	up to 100 PEL (1980)	up to 50 PEL	11, 16, 17 ...
Negative pressure air-purifying respirator with full face mask, UK	> 2000 (for gases) or >1000 (for aerosols)	up to 900 OEL (1980)	up to 40 OEL	11, 16, 17 ...
Negative pressure air-purifying respirator with half mask facepiece, USA	> 25 000	up to 10 PEL (since the 1960s)		2.2, 2.8, 4 ...
Self-contained breathing apparatus with air supply on demand, USA	> 250 000	up to 1000 PEL (1992)	up to 50 PEL	Monitoring showed low efficiency for carbon monoxide exposure

The National Institute for Occupational Safety and Health of the USA now requires the manufacturers of high-performance RPE to perform testing at representative workplaces as a requirement for certification.

== See also ==
- Respirator Assigned Protection Factors
- Respirator fit test
