= Aeromedical Biological Containment System =

Air-transport system for isolated patients

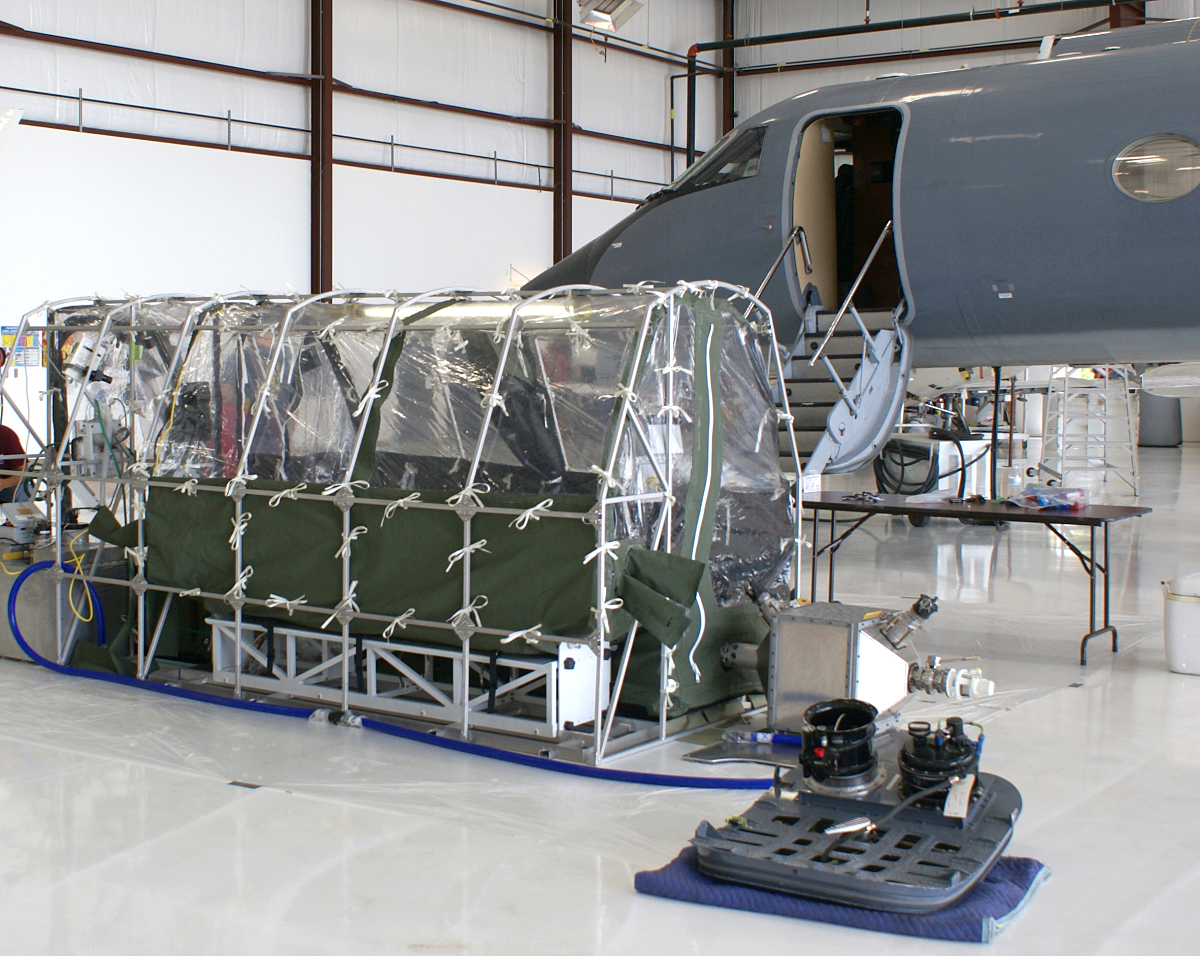
The Aeromedical Biological Containment System (ABCS): Phoenix Air's isolator with its Gulfstream III platform and associated equipment.

The Aeromedical Biological Containment System (ABCS) is an aeromedical evacuation capability devised by the U.S. Centers for Disease Control and Prevention (CDC) in collaboration with the U.S. Department of Defense (DoD) and government contractor Phoenix Air between 2007 and 2010. Its purpose is to safely air-transport a highly contagious patient; it comprises a transit isolator (a tent-like plastic structure provided with negative air pressure to prevent escape of airborne-contagious pathogens) and an appropriately configured supporting aircraft. Originally developed to support CDC staff who might become infected while investigating avian flu and SARS in East Asia, it was never used until the 2014 Ebola virus epidemic in West Africa, transporting 36 Ebola patients out of West Africa.

== History ==
The CDC experienced difficulties and embarrassment relating to safe patient air-transport during an international tuberculosis scare in 2007. Additionally, the memory of the severe acute respiratory syndrome (SARS) epidemic of 2003-2004 and the then-current avian influenza threat (both potentially requiring transport of sick patients back to the U.S. from the Far East) prompted CDC officials to initiate the program that became the ABCS. The Cartersville, Georgia-based military airlift provider Phoenix Air was contracted; the CDC provided medical expertise to the collaboration, while the DoD provided some of the protective technology through its Edgewood Chemical Biological Center.

With the anticipated decommissioning of the U.S. Army's Aeromedical Isolation Team (AIT) in December 2010, the need for a new system to support transport of highly contagious patients became even more urgent. By that time, the ABCS had been extensively tested and was certified for its mission by the Federal Aviation Administration (FAA). The U.S. Air Force had also approved it for ferrying military personnel. The dedicated air platform for the ABCS was a 32-year-old Gulfstream III jet that had once been owned and operated by the Royal Danish Air Force as military tailcode "F-313". (F-313 had been sold to Phoenix Air in January 2005. Rechristened as air ambulance jet "N173PA", it was utilized in support of the 2007 TB incident.)

The international swine flu pandemic of 2009-10 did not occasion the need for air-transport under isolation of any CDC personnel. Consequently, the ABCS—which comprised three isolation units (but only one aircraft) by late-2011—was to some extent mothballed. That changed abruptly in late-July 2014 when Phoenix Air was asked if they could support a patient with a "bloodborne pathogen" (namely Ebola virus) as well as it could an "airborne pathogen" (such as TB or flu, for which it had been designed). Physicians from Phoenix, along with CDC experts, spent a day and a half reviewing the system, after which they all agreed it was suitable for Ebola patients. "In fact, it's probably over-engineered for Ebola, because it's designed for airborne pathogens," the Phoenix director stated. On 2 August 2014, the ABCS carried the first Ebola patient (Dr. Kent Brantly, an employee of Samaritan's Purse) ever to be evacuated to the United States; three days later, it transported another, Nancy Writebol. To date, Phoenix Air and the ABCS have flown five Ebola patients out of West Africa (four Americans—Brantly, Writebol, Dr Rick Sacra, and an unidentified American on September 9 -- and a German doctor from Sierra Leone to Hamburg, Germany). After the first two missions, Phoenix Air—which says it considered them successful "proof-of-concept flights"—decided that it would only undertake future missions under the aegis of the U.S. government. Challenges such as dealing with U.S. customs officials, obtaining permission to transit foreign airspace, and the selection of specific destination medical centers had become too onerous. Since then, the U.S. Department of State has coordinated all such flights, including those for foreigners returning to their own countries. U.S. taxpayers pick up the tab for official government patients, but reimbursement is required for all others. (Brantly and Writebol each cost about $200,000, including the cost of equipment decontamination, which their organization paid.)

Phoenix Air currently keeps only one plane on standby for transporting Ebola patients.

== Operation ==
The modular ABCS utilizes a transit isolator consisting of a metal frame supporting numerous items of medical equipment (heart and pulse oxygen monitors, etc.). Most of airframe's cabin space is taken up by the isolator. The framework is encased in a transparent plastic sheathing, or "tent". Only one patient—attended by one doctor and two nurses—can be accommodated in one isolator in one aircraft. The patient area is provided with continuous negative air pressure and air filtration to keep pathogens from entering the rest of the cabin. An antechamber to the patient area is used by medical personnel for donning and doffing personal protective equipment as well as for decontamination. Next to the isolator is a toilet for the patient's use.

After transport of an infected patient is completed, Phoenix Air performs a decontamination process stipulated by the CDC. This consists of spraying a powerful disinfectant inside the module for 24 hours and sending all contaminated contents — including the plastic casing, patient stretchers, and even walkie-talkies — to an incinerator (operated by a federally licensed hazardous-materials disposal team) for burning.

== See also ==
- Aeromedical Isolation Team
- United States biological defense program
