= Supplied-air respirator =

Breathing apparatuus remotely supplied by an air hose

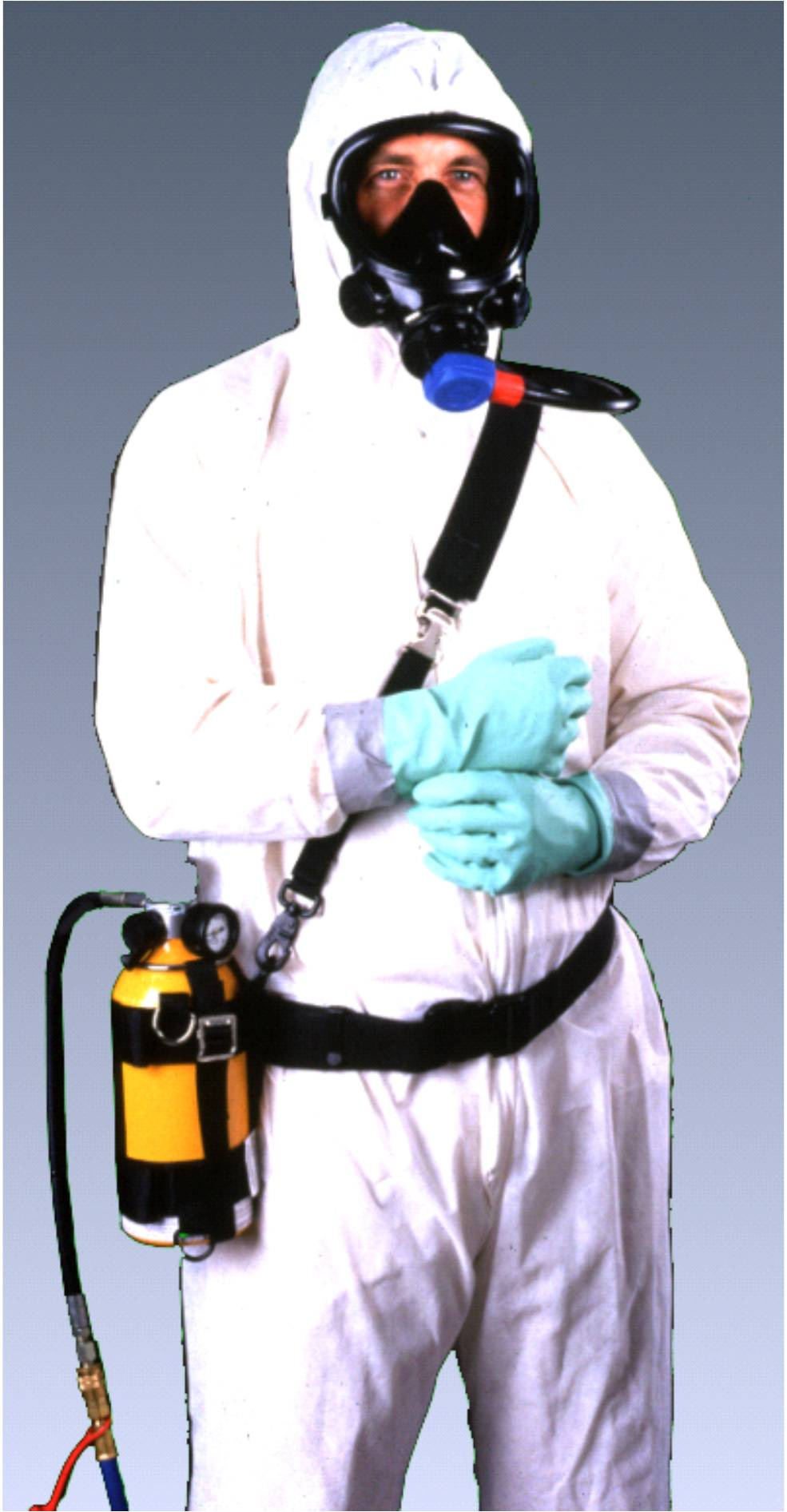
- A small backup air tank (yellow), is included for emergency use if the air-supply line is damaged.
- Other name(s): air-line respirator
- Regulated by: National Institute for Occupational Safety and Health, Canadian Standards Association
- Regulation: 42 CFR 84
- NIOSH schedule: TC-19C
- [edit on Wikidata]

A supplied-air respirator (SAR) or air-line respirator is a breathing apparatus used in places where the ambient air may not be safe to breathe. It uses an air hose to supply air from outside the danger zone. It is similar to a self-contained breathing apparatus (SCBA), except that SCBA users carry their air with them in high pressure cylinders, while SAR users get it from a remote stationary air supply connected to them by a hose. They may be equipped with a backup air tank in case the air-line gets cut.

== Description ==
SARs are lightweight, but tether the user. Unlike SCBAs, the worker will not run out of air when the tank they carry is empty. They can therefore be used for longer continuous work periods. The mask end of a SAR is generally lower-maintenance than an SCBA, but the air compressors or tanks at the other end of the hose require monitoring and maintenance. It is important that they deliver good air; contaminants (which may also be introduced by faulty operation of the machinery) can be dangerous.

If the air-supply line is cut or pinched shut, the user will not have any air to breathe. SAR users therefore often carry a small backup air tank (called an auxiliary escape cylinder). In an emergency, they can switch to using this supply, which should last long enough for them to escape the dangerous area. This backup bottle is required in some jurisdictions. Other regulations also apply. Users of SARs must generally be given hands-on training with the specific model they are to use.

SARs may be either constant-flow or pressure-demand respirators. Constant-flow respirators supply a steady stream of air, some of which escapes from the wearer end unbreathed. Pressure-demand respirators supply air only when the pressure in the wearer's mask drops (that is, when they inhale). This saves air but allows more inwards leakage. Pressure-demand respirators can only be used with a sealed elastomeric mask, not with a loose-fitting hood (like those used in powered air-purifying respirators) or helmet (used in construction). Hoods may be made of Tyvek, polyethylene, or polypropylene.

== Use ==
According to the NIOSH Respirator Selection Logic, SARs with an auxiliary SCBA are recommended for oxygen-deficient atmospheres, atmospheres that are immediately dangerous to life or health, and unknown atmospheres, all of which are conditions that air-purifying respirators such as N95 masks do not protect against. SARs without an auxiliary SCBA may also be used in conditions where an air-purifying respirator may be used, and have the benefit of a higher range of assigned protection factors (APF). Air-purifying respirators have APFs in the range 5–50 while SARs are in the range 25–2000, and full-facepiece pressure-demand SARs with an auxiliary pressure-demand SCBA have an APF of 10,000. For substances hazardous to the eyes, a respirator equipped with a full facepiece, helmet, or hood is recommended. SARs are not effective during firefighting, for which a SCBA is recommended instead.

== Regulation ==
=== United States ===
As of 2001, under 42 CFR 84, there are six types of supplied-air respirators. NIOSH definitions from the CEL software are provided below:

NIOSH supplied-air respirator classifications
Respirator class	NIOSH definition	Additional information from ANSI Z88.2–2015
Type A	"For entry into or escape from atmospheres not immediately dangerous to life or health, which consists of a motor-driven or hand-operated blower that permits the free entrance of air when the blower is not operating and a strong large-diameter hose having a low resistance to airflow".	N/A
Type AE	"A Type A supplied-air respirator equipped with additional devices designed to protect the wearer's head and neck against impact and abrasion from rebounding abrasive material, and with shielding material such as plastic, glass, woven wire, sheet metal, or other suitable material to protect the window(s) of facepieces, hoods, and helmets which do not unduly interfere with the wearer's vision and permit easy access to the external surface of such window(s) for cleaning".	N/A
Type B	"A hose mask respirator, for entry into and escape from atmospheres not immediately dangerous to life or health, which consists of a strong large diameter hose with low resistance to airflow which the use draws inspired air by means of his lungs alone, a harness to which the hose is attached, and a tight-fitting facepiece".	N/A
Type BE	"A Type B supplied-air respirator equipped with additional devices designed to protect the wearer's head and neck against impact and abrasion from rebounding abrasive material, and with shielding material such as plastic, glass, woven wire, sheet metal, or other suitable material to protect the window(s) of facepieces, hoods, and helmets which do not unduly interfere with the wearer's vision and permit easy access to the external surface of such window(s) for cleaning".	N/A
Type C	"An airline respirator, for entry into and escape from atmospheres not immediately dangerous to life or health, which consists of a source of respirable breathing air, a hose, a detachable coupling, a control valve, orifice, a demand valve or pressure demand valve, and arrangement for attaching the hose to the wearer and a facepiece, hood, or helmet".	Comes in "continuous-flow", "demand", and "pressure-demand" configurations, like a self-contained breathing apparatus.; Maximum hose length of 300 feet (91 m); Use in IDLH situations allowed only if backup air is provided; Grade D air required
Type CE	"A Type C supplied-air respirator equipped with additional devices designed to protect the wearer's head and neck against impact and abrasion from rebounding abrasive material, and with shielding material such as plastic, glass, woven wire, sheet metal, or other suitable material to protect the window(s) of facepieces, hoods, and helmets which do not unduly interfere with the wearer's vision and permit easy access to the external surface of such window(s) for cleaning".	See above
