= Aeromedical Isolation Team =

Former US Army aeromobile biocontainment team

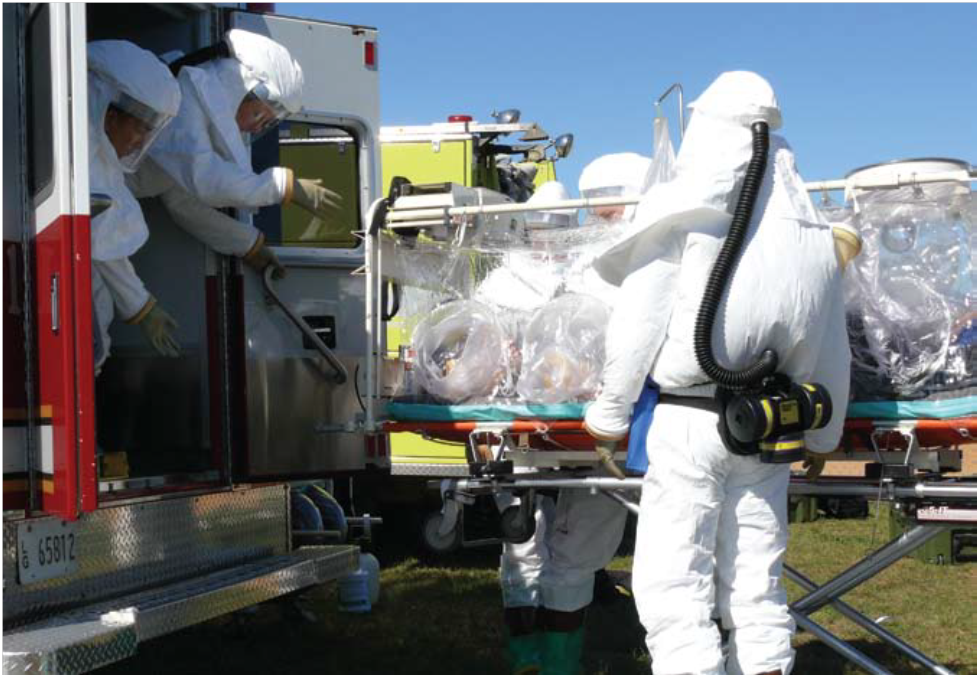
The AIT conducting training in PPE while transporting a mock patient in an ATI at Fort Detrick. (Photo by Bruce Maston, 2007)

The Aeromedical Isolation Team (AIT, or SMART-AIT) of the US Army Medical Research Institute of Infectious Diseases (USAMRIID) at Fort Detrick, Maryland was a military rapid response team with worldwide airlift capability designed to safely evacuate and manage contagious patients under high-level (BSL-4) bio-containment conditions. Created in 1978, during its final years the AIT was one of MEDCOM’s Special Medical Augmentation Response Teams (SMART teams) comprising a portable containment laboratory along with its transit isolators for patient transport. Contingency missions included bioterrorism scenarios as well as the extraction of scientists with exotic infections from remote sites in foreign countries. The AIT trained continuously and was often put on alert status, but only deployed for “real world” missions four times. The AIT was decommissioned in 2010 and its mission was assumed by one of the US Air Force’s Critical Care Air Transport Teams (CCATTs).

== History ==
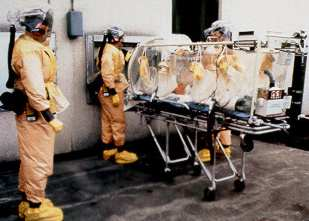
AIT members (with an older type of Racal suits) prepare to transfer a patient from a stretcher isolator into a BSL-4 medical care suite

The AIT was created in 1978 for purposes of contingency air evacuation of a hypothetical USAMRIID researcher who might become exposed to a highly infectious pathogen while undertaking endemic surveillance in remote areas of the world where a suspected or known disease outbreak was occurring. At the core of AIT operations was its specialized equipment, notably the Aircraft Transit Isolator (ATI). Developed by Vickers in the U.K. in the 1970s - and manufactured in later years by Elwyn Roberts Isolators, Shropshire, UK, until 2007 - the ATI was a self-contained unit capable of transporting a patient with a highly virulent disease and at the same time providing maximum microbiological security while full nursing care and treatment are rendered. It was designed to minimize the risk of transmission to air crews and caregivers, whether military or civilian. The interior of the isolator was maintained at a pressure negative to the external environment by a high-efficiency particulate air (HEPA) filtered blower. The isolator could be attached directly to a transfer port, situated on the external wall of the main USAMRIID building, to allow movement of the patient into a BSL-4 medical care suite without exposing the environment to the patient. While moving the isolator, team members wore protective suits and positive-pressure, HEPA-filtered Racal hoods (manufactured by Racal Health & Safety, Inc, Frederick, Maryland).

Throughout its existence the AIT was associated with a BSL-4 Medical Containment Suite (MCS, called “the Slammer”) at USAMRIID for ICU-level patient care under biocontainment. The MCS was built in 1969 and became operational in 1972; it was the destination to which contagious patients were to be removed by the AIT. Over the years the scope of the AIT/MCS mission was expanded to include U.S. military personnel, the U.S. Centers for Disease Control and Prevention, and U.S. citizens or foreign nationals deemed to be in need of service by the U.S. Department of State. Occasionally, the AIT trained with similar teams of foreign allies.

In 2007, due to the death of Mr Roberts, the ATI and associated products ceased to be manufactured. During 2008–2010, the AIT began preliminary training with, and testing of, a new transit isolator product - the Patient Isolation Unit (PIU) - developed by the Gentex Corporation under a contract with the U.S. Air Force.

The AIT was decommissioned - along with the MCS - in 2010 and its mission was assumed by one of the US Air Force’s Critical Care Air Transport Teams (CCATTs). The Air Force's capabilities, however, do not meet the standard of biocontainment (BSL-4) facilities, but rather represent enhanced patient isolation. No BSL-4 ICU facility has replaced the Army's former MCS to date.

=== Selected AIT alerts and deployments ===
- Deployed to Reston virus outbreak, 1989
- Deployed to Sweden in support of Marburg virus patient management, 1989
- Alerted for Ebola outbreak in Zaire, 1993
- On call for Yale researcher with Sabia virus exposure, 1994
- Alerted for military physician Machupo virus exposure, 1994
- Alert for Ebola, Zaire outbreak, 1995
- Deployed to Wright-Patterson AFB, Bio-bomblets, Dec 1995
- Alerted for deployment to Rwanda/Zaire 1996
- NYC, Bronx Zoo, West Nile virus, Oct 1999
- Alerted to support with possible Ebola exposure in Uganda, Dec 2000
- Alerted for support with anthrax mailings, 2001
- Alerted to support WTC attacks, 2001
- On orders to support the Presidential State of the Union Address, 30 January 2002
- On orders to support the Winter Olympics, 17 January to 20 March 2002
- Advisors for SARS outbreak, 2003
- Alerted for XDR-TB patient, May 2007
- Alerted for Viral hemorrhagic fever outbreak in Congo, Aug 2007

== See also ==
- United States biological defense program
- List of former United States Army medical units
- Aeromedical Biological Containment System
