= Racal suit =

Protective suit with powered air-purifying respirator

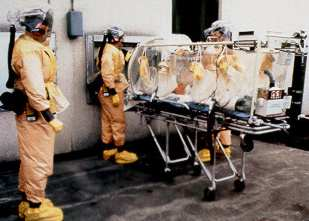
Racal suits used at the United States Army Medical Research Institute of Infectious Diseases

A Racal suit (also known as a Racal space suit) is a protective suit with a powered air-purifying respirator (PAPR). It consists of a plastic suit and a battery-operated blower with HEPA filters that supplies filtered air to a positive-pressure hood (also known as a Racal hood). Racal suits were among the protective suits used by the Aeromedical Isolation Team (AIT) of the United States Army Medical Research Institute of Infectious Diseases to evacuate patients with highly infectious diseases for treatment.

Originally, the hood was manufactured by Racal Health & Safety, a subsidiary of Racal Electronics located in Frederick, Maryland, the same city where AIT was based. The division of Racal responsible for the suit's manufacture later became part of 3M, and the respirator product line was branded as 3M/Racal.

== Components ==
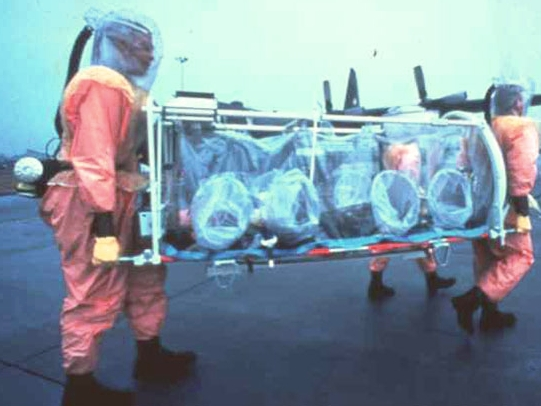
Details of the suit components

The main body of the protective suit consists of a lightweight coverall made of polyvinyl chloride (PVC), rubber gloves, and rubber boots. Originally, the coverall was in a bright orange color, and the Racal suit was known as an orange suit.

The hood is a separate component from the protective suit. The Racal hood is a type of PAPR consisting of a transparent hood connected to a respirator, which is powered by a rechargeable battery. The respirator has three HEPA filters that are certified to remove 99.7% of particles of 0.03 to 3.0 microns in diameter. The filtered air is supplied at the rate of 170 L/min to the top of the hood under positive pressure for breathing and cooling. The air is forced out through an air exhaust valve at the base of the hood. A two-way radio system is installed inside the hood for communication. The AIT later switched from using transparent bubble hoods to butyl rubber hoods.

== Procedures ==
The main purpose of the AIT was to evacuate a patient from the field to a specialized isolation unit. As part of their procedures, AIT members wore Racal suits while transporting the patients. They were trained to take a bathroom break before suiting up, since the time they would be in the suits could be 1 hour and 45 minutes for a training session and 4 to 6 hours for an actual mission. The patient was placed in a mobile stretcher isolator during transit. After the patient was delivered to the isolation unit, the members would leave the unit and enter into an anteroom with an airlock. They were then sprayed with glutaraldehyde solution to disinfect before the suit was cut away and sent to an on-site incinerator for complete destruction.

== Similar suits ==
The Racal suit is similar to other positive pressure personnel suits such as the Chemturion, in that there is an air supply to provide positive pressure to reduce the chance of airborne agents entering the suit. However, several components are different. The positive pressure section for the Racal suit is only available at the hood. The air supply for Racal suits comes from a battery-operated blower that makes the suit portable, whereas other suits must be connected to an air hose that is part of the building, such as in Biosafety Level 4 laboratories. The main body part of the Racal suit is also more lightweight and can be disposed of by burning after use.

== In popular culture ==
Racal suits were used in films such as Outbreak in 1995. The term is also used in literature related to situations with infectious diseases, such as in The Hot Zone: A Terrifying True Story, Infected, and Executive Orders.
