= Respirator fit test =

Safety procedure for testing PPE air-tightness

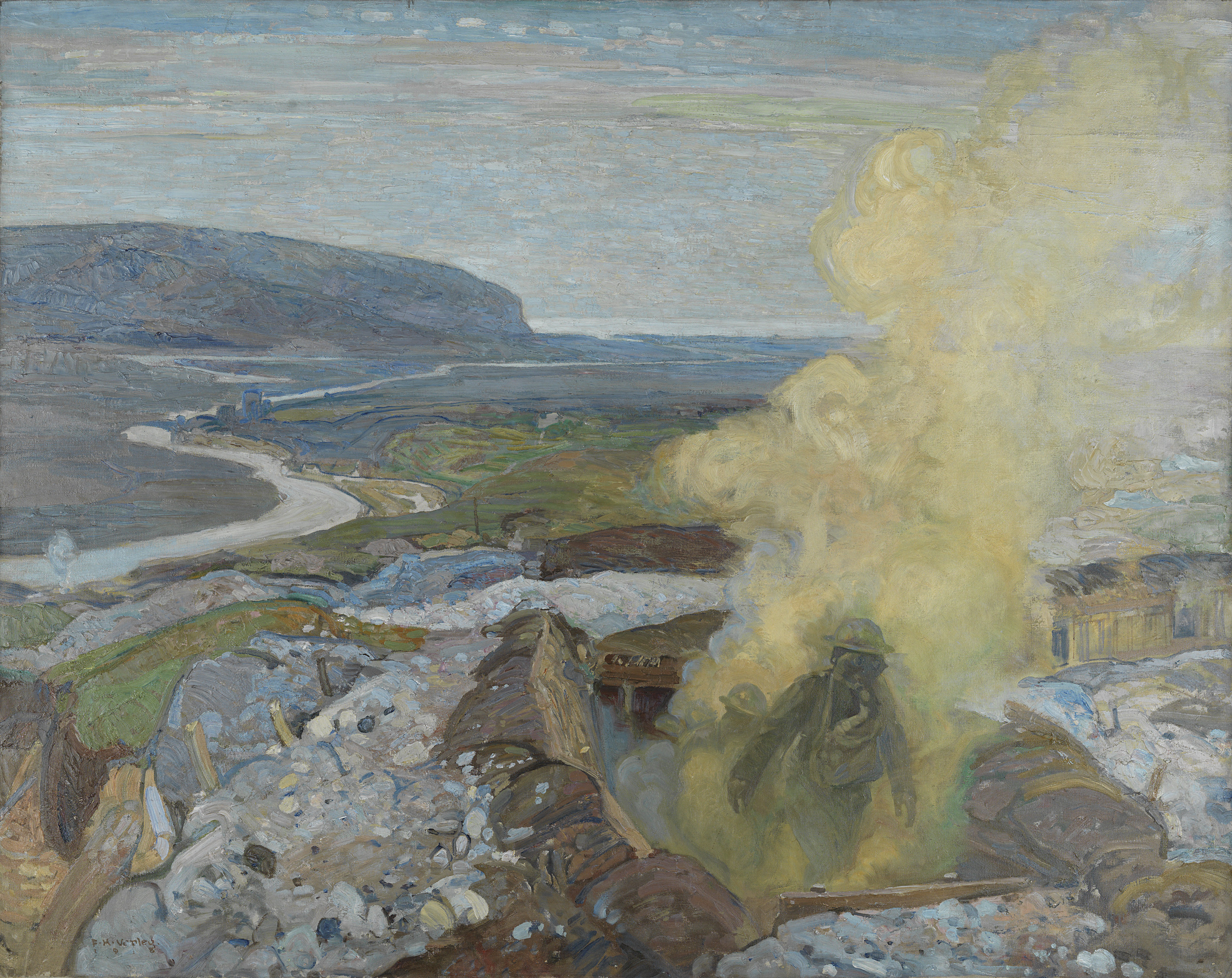
F.H. Varley painting of a training exercise in Seaford, England, with soldiers emerging from a gas hut wearing respirators

A respirator fit test checks if a respirator properly fits the face of a user. A fitted respirator must be able to separate a user's respiratory system from ambient air.

The test involves tightly pressing the mask against the face (without gaps) to ensure an efficient seal on the mask perimeter. Protection depends on an airtight seal, making testing necessary before entering contaminated air. Mask size and shape correctly fitted to the user's face provides better protection in hazardous environments. Facial hair, such as beards, can interfere with proper fit.

== History ==
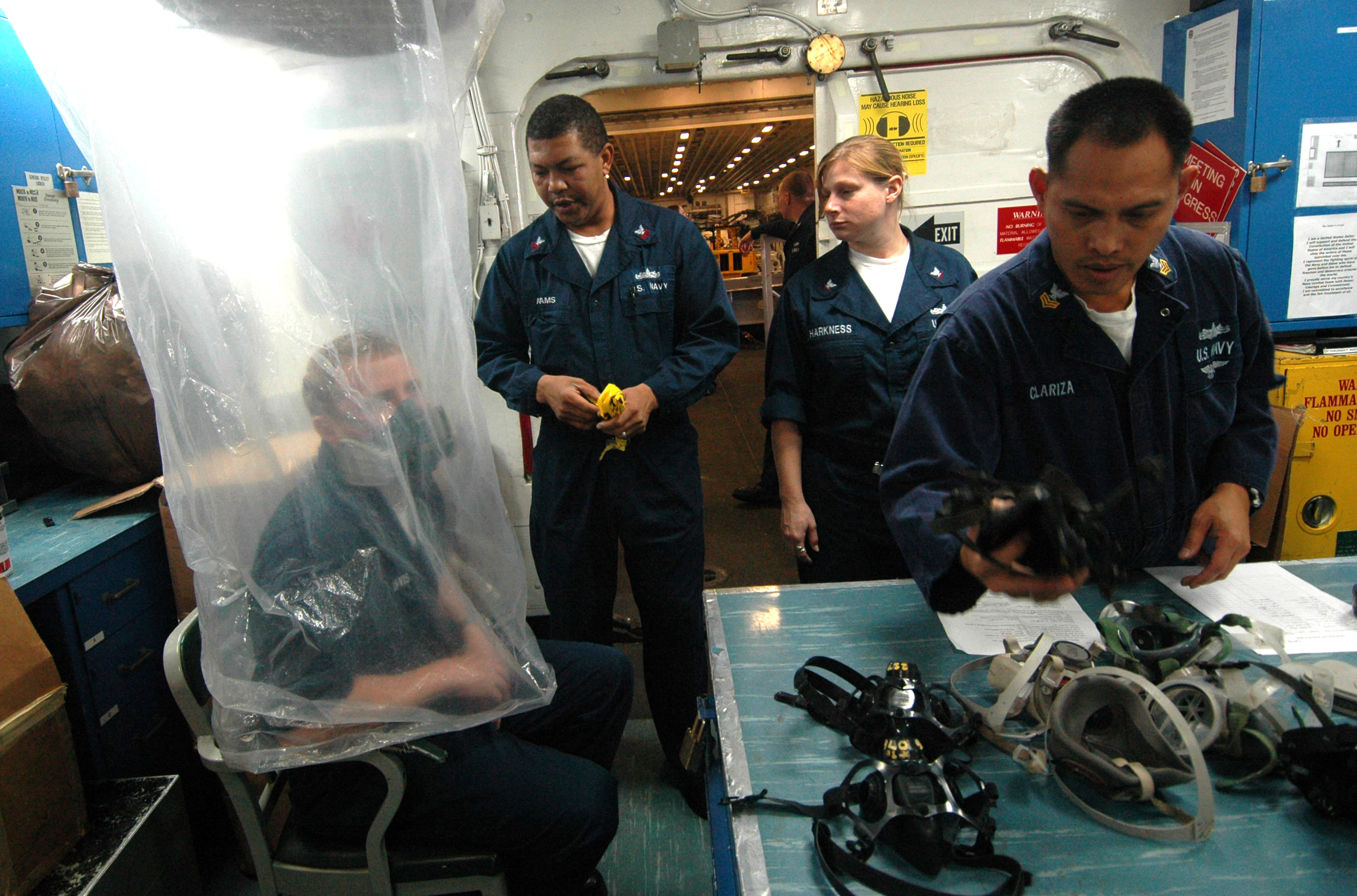
Fit test in the United States Navy

The effectiveness of various types of respirators was measured in laboratories and the workplace. The measurements indicated that the effectiveness of negative-pressure, tight-fitting respiratory protective devices (RPD) depends on leakage between mask and face, rather than on filters or canisters. A decrease in efficiency due to leakage occurred on a large scale during World War I, when gas masks were used to protect against chemical weapons; poor fit or poorly-situated masks could be fatal. The Russian army began to use short-term exposure to chlorine at low concentrations to solve this problem in 1917. Testing helped convince soldiers that their gas masks were reliable, because respirators were a novelty. Industrial workers were trained in gas chambers in the USSR (in preparation for the Second World War). German firefighters used a similar test between the First and Second World Wars. Diluted chloropicrin was used to test industrial gas masks, and the Soviet army used chloropicrin in tents with a floor space of 16 square meters.

== Methods ==
Respirator selection and use is regulated in many countries. Regulations often include a test of negative pressure for each individual wearer.

Fit-test methods are qualitative (QLFT) and quantitative (QNFT). Detailed descriptions are given in the US standard developed by the Occupational Safety and Health Administration (OSHA). This standard regulates respirator selection and organization; Appendix A describes fit testing, and compliance with this standard is mandatory for US employers.

=== Qualitative ===
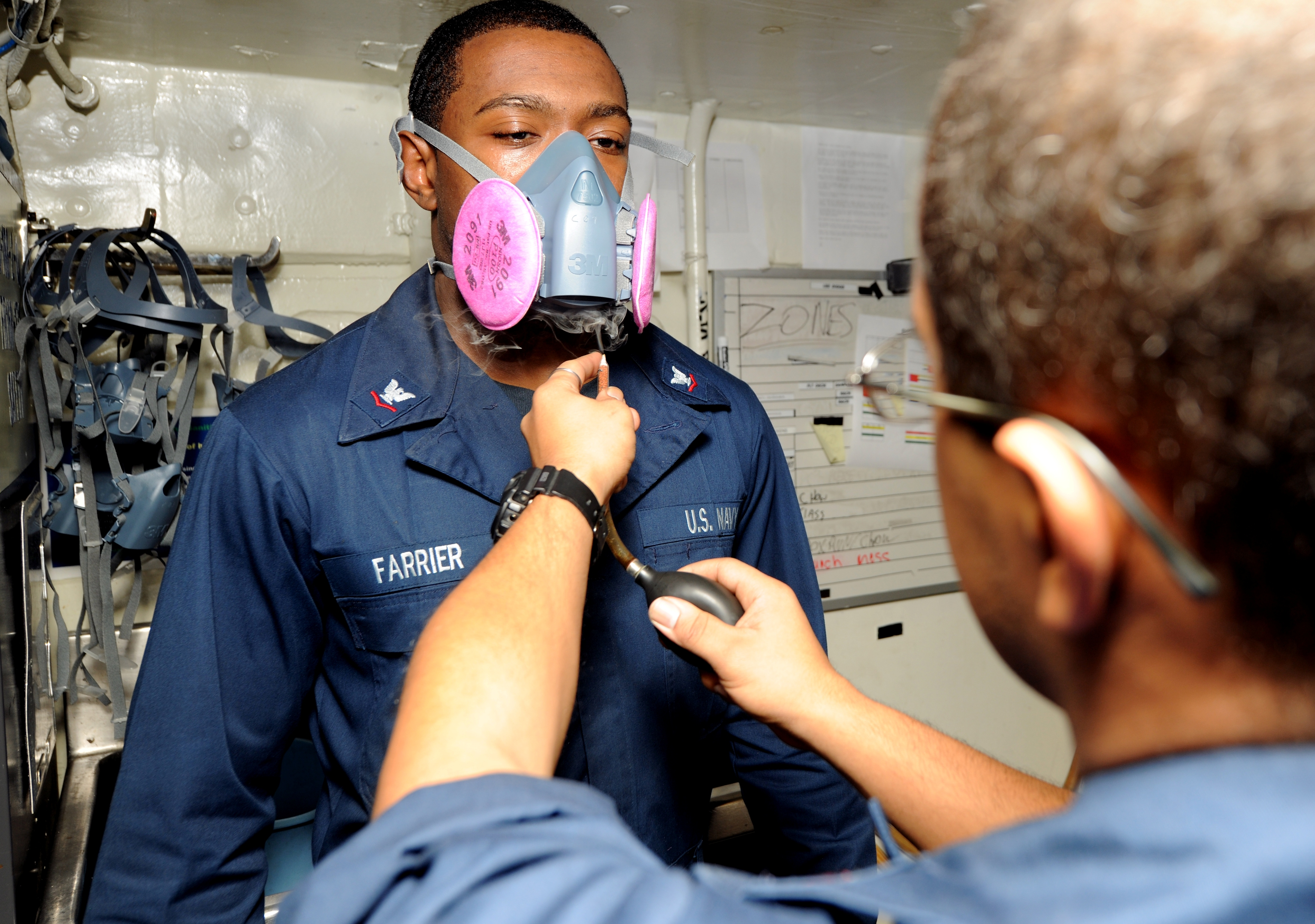
Irritant-smoke fit test

These methods use the reaction of workers to the taste or smell of a gas, vapors or aerosol if it leaks into the mask. Such reactions are subjective, requiring the subject to report results honestly. A qualitative fit test begins with a non-respirator sampling of the substance of choice to verify that the subject can detect it accurately. Such substances include:

- Isoamyl acetate: This substance smells like bananas, and is used only for fit testing of elastomeric respirators.
- Saccharin: Mixed with water and aerosolized, saccharin's sweet taste is used to test elastomeric and filtering respirator masks. A subject breathes through their mouth, slightly sticking out their tongue.
- Denatonium: A bitter-tasting substance which can be used to detect gaps. It is mixed with water and sprayed like the above materials.
- Irritant smoke: Irritates mucous membranes, resulting in coughing, sneezing and other discomfort. NIOSH recommended discontinuing this method, since exposure (in high humidity, for example) may significantly exceed the permissible exposure limit.

=== Quantitative ===
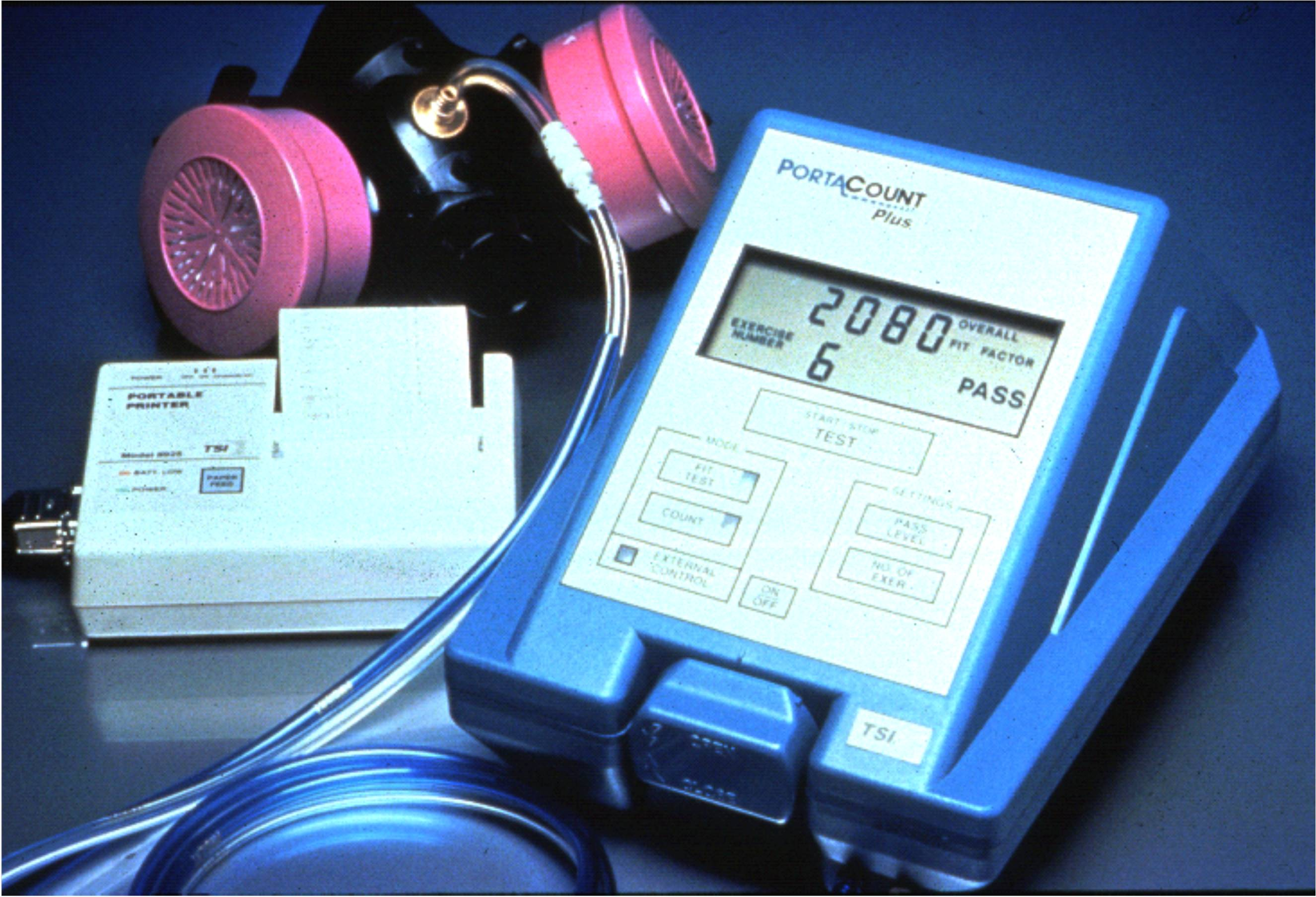
TSI PortaCount Plus, a device for ambient aerosol fit testing

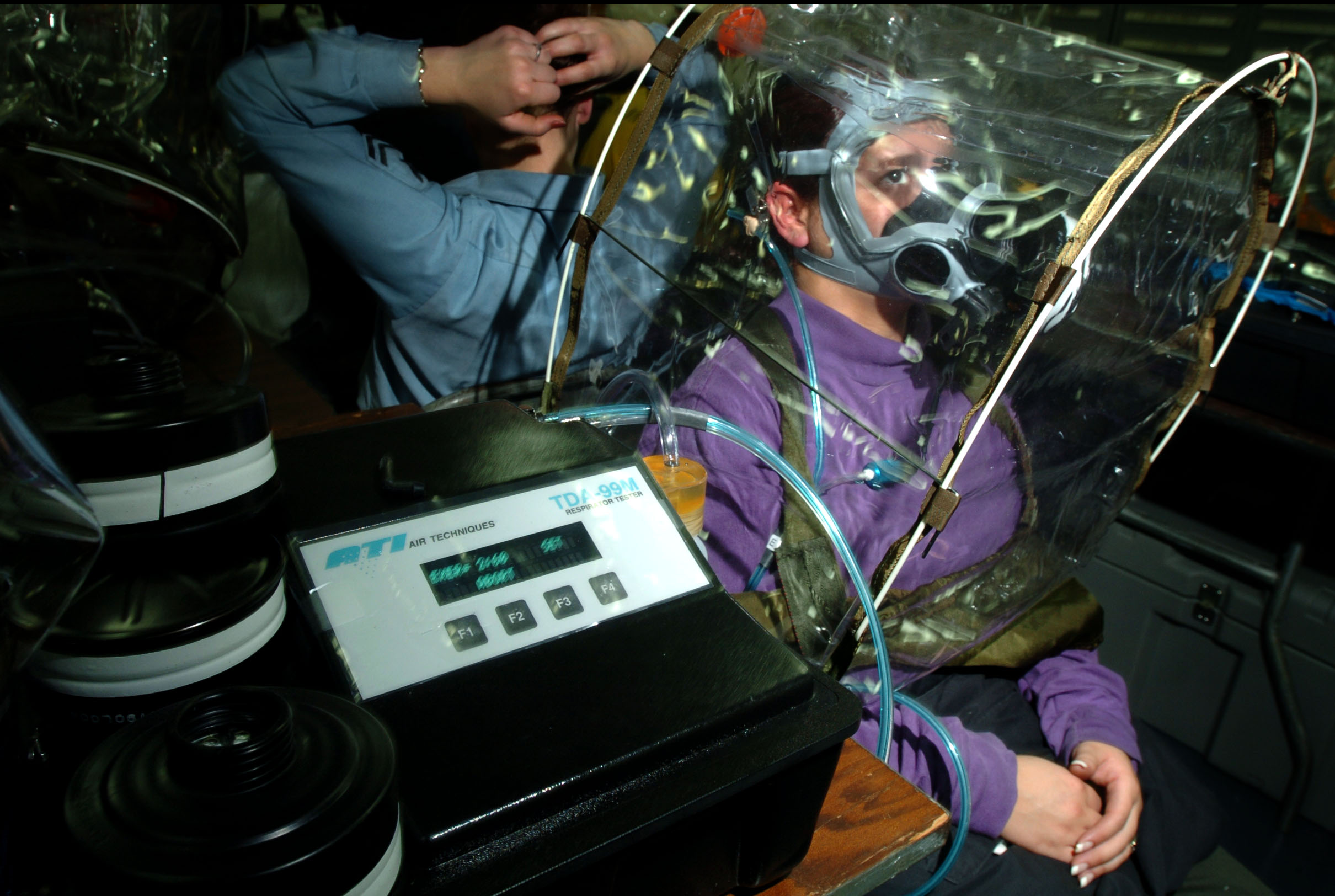
Air Techniques International TDA-99M, used for generated-aerosol fit testing

Concentrations of a control substance (challenge agent) inside and outside a mask can be measured, determining the flow rate of air under the mask. Quantitative methods are more accurate and reliable than qualitative methods because they do not rely on subjective sensing of a challenge agent. Unlike qualitative methods, quantitative methods provide a data-based, defensible metric.

==== Ambient aerosol method ====
An aerosol test measures internal and external aerosol concentrations. The aerosol can be artificial or a natural, atmospheric component. The ratio of external to internal concentration is known as the fit factor (FF). U.S. law requires employers to offer employees masks with an adequate fit factor. For half face-piece masks (used when the concentration of harmful substances is not more than 10 PEL), the fit factor must be at least 100; for full face masks (not more than 50 PEL), the fit factor must be at least 500. The safety factor of 10 compensates for the difference between testing and workplace conditions. To use an atmospheric aerosol, a PortaCount or AccuFIT device is needed. These devices increase the size of the smallest particles through vapor condensation (condensation particle counting, or CPC), and determines their concentration by count. Aerosols include sodium chloride and calcium carbonate. This method is standard for determining respirator fit for users in healthcare settings and research laboratories.

OSHA has approved a fast fit protocol which enables AAC/CPC (ambient aerosol concentration/condensation particle counting) to be performed in less than three minutes. The major advantage of the AAC/CPC method is that the test subject is moving and breathing while the fit factor is measured, better replicating actual conditions.

==== Flow (pressure) methods ====
Flow methods are a more-recent development. When a worker inhales, some aerosol is deposited in their respiratory system; this lowers the exhaled concentration. During inhalation, leaked, unfiltered air trickles under the mask before mixing with air inside the mask. If the stream collides with the sampling probe, the measured concentration becomes higher than the actual value; if the trickle does not come into contact with a probe, the concentration becomes lower.

Control negative pressure (CNP) directly measures the volume of air leaking into a respirator, and this is converted into a fit factor. Using a challenge pressure of 53.8 – 93.1 L/min, CNP devices stress the mask as a user would while breathing heavily under extreme physical conditions. The CNP method of fit testing is OSHA, NFPA and ISO certified.

The Dichot method differs from CNP in that common filters are installed on the mask and air is quickly pumped out of the mask, creating a vacuum. The negative pressure depends on filter resistance and leak rate. Filter resistance is measured with a sealed attachment of the mask to a dummy, allowing calculation of the leak rate through gaps.

== Industry ==
U.S. law began requiring employers to assign and test a mask for each employee before assignment to positions requiring respirator use, every 12 months thereafter and, optionally, in circumstances that could affect fit such as injury or tooth loss. Other countries have similar requirements. A U.S. study indicated that nearly all large enterprises complied with these regulations in 2001, but about half of enterprises with fewer than 10 employees were non-compliant.

== Comparison ==
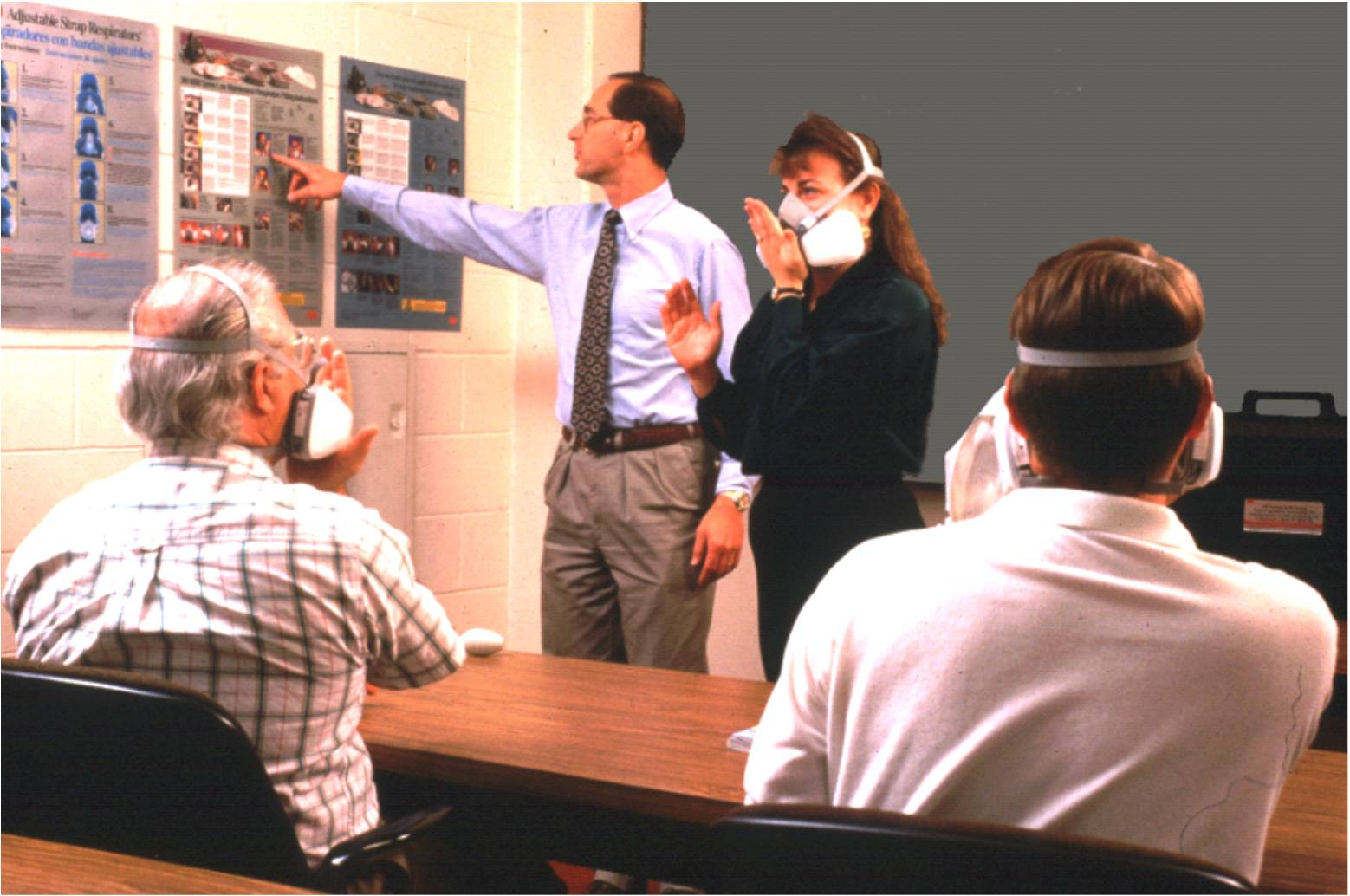
User seal checks and respirator training should be done before fit testing.

The main advantage of qualitative fit tests is low equipment cost; their main drawback is modest precision, not sensitive enough for masks for atmospheres exceeding 10 PEL. To reduce the risk of choosing a poorly-fitting respirator, the mask needs a sufficient fitting characteristic. Multiple masks must be examined, although poor test protocols may yield incorrect results. Re-checks require time and increase costs. In 2001, the most common QLFT was irritant smoke and saccharin, but NIOSH advised against using irritant smoke in 2004.

CNP is a relatively-inexpensive, fast quantitative method. However, a disposable filtering face-piece mask (such as the N95, N99, and N100 masks) cannot be tested with CNP. Fit tests with an atmospheric aerosol may be used on any respirator, but the cost of earlier devices (PortaCount) and the duration of the test was slightly greater than CNP. The OSHA Fast Fit protocols for CNC methods and newer instruments have made all quantitative fit-test devices equivalent in price and speed. In 2001, the CNP method had about 15 percent of the industrial fit-test market.

Fit-test methods for masks
Method	Types			Testing devices
Method	Filtering half-facepiece	Elastomeric half-facepiece respirators and elastomeric full-facepiece mask, used in workplaces with concentrations of contaminants up to 10 PEL	Elastomeric full-facepiece mask, used in workplaces with concentrations of contaminants up to 50 PEL	Testing devices
Qualititative methods				
Isoamyl acetate	Unlikely to pass (Note: Although called "banana oil" (implying use with oil-resistant filters, the protocol requires organic vapor cartridges. Organic vapor cartridges are not found on filtering facepiece respirators.)	Yes	No	Allegro-0202 et al.
Saccharin	Yes	Yes	No	3М FT-10 et al.
Bitrex	Yes	Yes	No	3М FT-30 et al.
Irritant smoke (Note: Not recommended by NIOSH.)	Class-100 filters only	Yes	No	Allegro-2050, VeriFit, RAE 10-123-01 et al.
Quantitative methods				
Control negative pressure (CNP) (Note: CNP with modeled breathing rate. The status of Quantafit (Dynatech Frontier) CNP modeled decay rate is unknown.)	Impossible to pass (Note: CNP machines cannot test respirators where the entire assembly is penetrable by air, like a filtering facepiece.)	Yes	Yes	FitTester 3000 (DNI Nevada/OHD), Quantifit (OHD), QuantiFit2 (OHD)
Ambient aerosol method (CPC)	Yes	Yes	Yes	PortaCount, Accufit 9000, OHD AeroFit
Generated aerosol method (Aerosol Photometer)	Oil-resistant filters only (Note: Generated aerosols use DOP or PAO as a test agent, similar to the oil used during initial respirator approval.)	Yes	Yes	TDA-99M, TSI 8587A
