= Mask bloc =

Type of organization distributing masks

A mask bloc is a type of mutual aid group dedicated to the collection and distribution of face masks and other items such as rapid tests in the context of the COVID-19 pandemic.

Mask blocs distribute certified face-covering masks, considered respirators, with certifications such as N95, N99 in North America, and FFP in Europe.

== Context ==
In response to the global COVID-19 pandemic, disability advocates and individuals impacted by long COVID began grassroots mutual aid efforts across the United States to distribute free masks.

In May 2023, the World Health Organization declared the end of the global health emergency response to the COVID-19 pandemic.

Some of the public health policies in place were stopped. Collectives known as mask blocs started forming as hubs to continue collect and distribute personal protective equipment (PPE) and tests. They used social media to spread the word.

The first mask blocs began in the US, in cities like Portland and New Orleans and on college campuses like UC Davis. They identify harm reduction outreach, abolitionist work, disability justice organizing, and disaster related mutual aid as their core principles.

By 2023 and 2024, American mask blocs were no longer limited to major metro areas, with dozens of groups distributing masks in cities, rural communities, and small cities.

== Activities of a mask bloc ==
Although each mask bloc is independent, organizers often collaborate by sharing information about mask sales and auctions.

Depending on the scale of the mask bloc, some offer support beyond individual requests and partner with events and protests to provide free masks, tests and sometimes air purifiers on a larger scale.

Masks can be distributed in communal spaces, identified distribution points, during events, or even in public spaces such as metro stations and bus stops.

Organizers have sometimes been involved in pushing for the reinstatement of mask mandates and better air filtration in places considered essential.

There has been some criticism of the practices of mask blocs from former members and others concerned about COVID-19. One bloc, based in Louisville, Kentucky, was dissolved due to anti-Blackness.

== January 2025 Southern Californian wildfires and mask distribution ==
During the January 2025 Southern California wildfires, mask blocs like Mask Bloc LA distributed masks in Los Angeles to populations dealing with hazardous levels of smoke and chemicals in the air.

Volunteers handed out N95 and KN95 masks at evacuation shelters.

Groups also distributed masks to homeless populations across Los Angeles who would be impacted directly by the smoke during the Palisades and Eaton fires.

Mask blocs have also partnered with various organizations known as Clean Air Clubs in the context of wildfires and the impact of smoke and air pollution. These organizations lend out high-quality air purifiers for events in indoor venues.

== Distribution of mask blocs worldwide ==
As of July 2026, there are mask blocs in the United States, Canada, Australia, New Zealand, and several countries in Europe and South America.
