= Elastomeric respirator =

Respirator with a rubber face seal

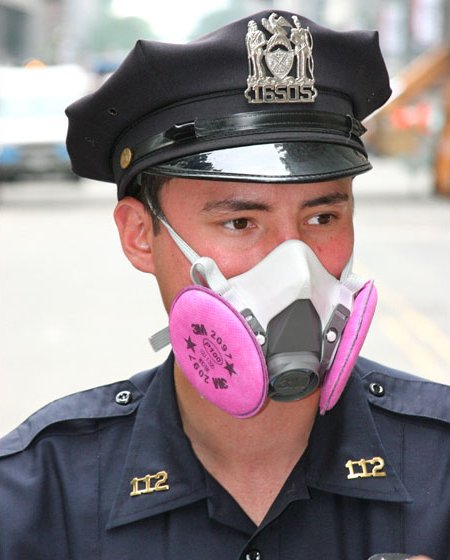
- Protective P100 half-face elastomeric filter mask worn by a NYPD officer; proprietary 3M pink pancake filters
- [edit on Wikidata]

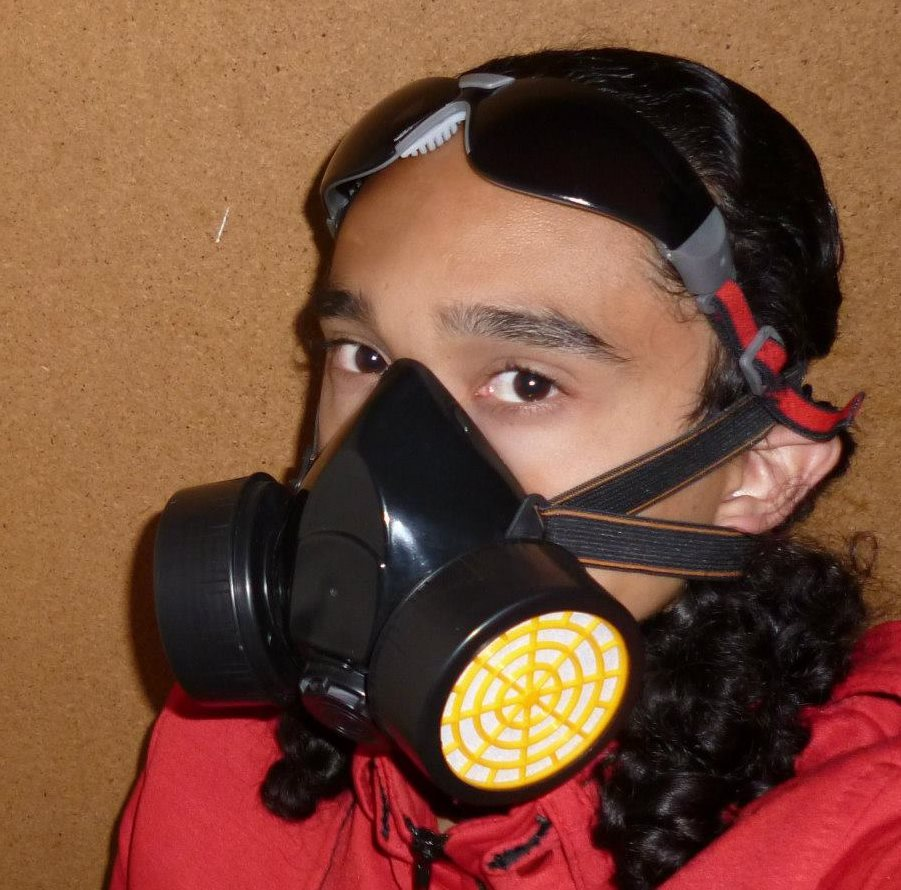
Similar mask with generic flat disk filters.

Elastomeric respirators, also called reusable air-purifying respirators, seal to the face with elastomeric material, which may be a natural or synthetic rubber. They are generally reusable. Full-face versions of elastomeric respirators seal better and protect the eyes.

Elastomeric respirators consist of a reusable mask that seals to the face, with exchangeable filters. Elastomeric respirators can be used with chemical cartridge filters that remove gases, mechanical filters that retain particulate matter, or both. As particulate filters, they are comparable (or, due to the quality and error-tolerance of the elastomeric seal, possibly superior) to filtering facepiece respirators such as most disposable N95 respirators and FFP masks.

Elastomeric air-purifying respirators are designed to be safely reused for years. Provided the cartridge integrity and filter have not been compromised, current practice shows that the filters could be used for at least one year. Some, but not all, filter materials are proprietary and manufacturer-specific, and supply-chain failures can make replacements hard to find.

Although powered air-purifying respirators and air-supplying respirators may have elastomeric masks, they are not generally referred to as elastomeric respirators.

== Physical form ==
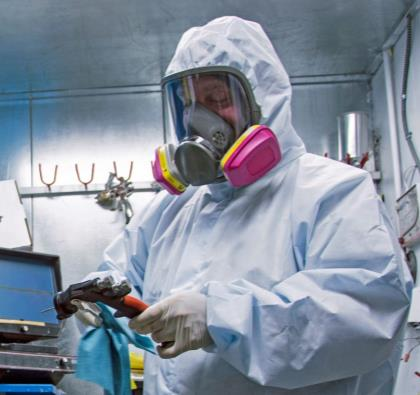
This full-face mask also protects the eyes, and has an inner orinasal mask to reduce dead space. Pink hard-case P100 particulate filter cartridges make their presence or absence conspicuous at a distance.

Elastomeric respirators are examples of air-filtering respirators, in contrast to air-supplying respirators. Air-supplying respirators are usually positive-pressure, so they leak outwards, and thus offer better protection. They are more complex and heavier, but less bulky about the head, and can be worn for longer. Air-purifying respirators draw the surrounding air through filters which remove contaminants.

A range of elastomers are used, including silicone, neoprene, EPDM (ethylene propylene diene monomer rubber), or proprietary elastomers such as Hycar. Latex is rarely used due to allergies. Many manufacturers offer a choice of two materials.

Elastomeric respirators include:

- mouth-bit respirators, which fit in the mouth with the nose pinched shut (escape only)
- quarter-mask or orinasal mask, covering the mouth and nose only
- half-mask, from below the eyes to below the chin
- fullface mask, from above the eyes to below the chin

Some elastomeric masks include one-way valves to let exhaled air out unfiltered. This reduces the resistance when the user is breathing out, and some find it makes the mask more comfortable. It may also reduce inwards leakage. However, masks which do not filter exhaled air cannot be used for source control.

== Filter types ==
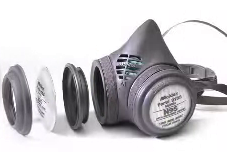
An exploded view of a respirator, showing two reusable plastic screw-on rings and a disposable disk of N95 particulate filter material.

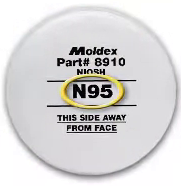
Disk of filter material from previous image, with mark showing it is N95-certified circled

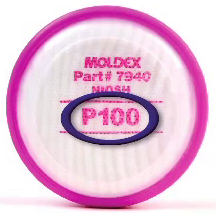
Another type of filter disk. This is a P100 filter, a higher standard than the previous N95 filter.

Air-purifying respirators have filters. The masks and filters come in a variety of standards for mechanical filters and for chemical cartridges, intended for a variety of purposes. An appropriate standard of filter must be used for the mask to be effective.

Filters may be contained in cartridges or canisters; there are also flexible flat and pancake-style filters (see illustrations). Filters are usually mounted on the face, but in the case of powered air-purifying respirators, they are mounted on the belt, and a fan drives air through them and into the face mask. Most masks take one or more filters.

=== Particulate filters ===
As of 2020, the commercially available particulate filter disks and cartridges are disposable, and must be replaced when clogged due to accumulated particles (so that breathing resistance is too high), damaged (torn or soiled with something that will damage the filter, such as many fluids; physical or chemical damage), or contaminated (the outside has caught dangerous particulates; for instance, infectious particles). Disinfection and reuse techniques have been tested for emergency use; some, like soap and water, destroy traditional disposable electret filters by removing the electret charge. Launderable, reusable electret filters were being developed during the COVID-19 pandemic.

Particulate filters may be simple disks or other shapes of flat filter material, which are lightweight, or they may be pancake-style hollow discs with a smaller central plastic connecting tube on one side. Particulate filters may also be enclosed in hard-cased disposable cartridges. The disposable cases protect the filter against splashes and can be wiped clean, which may be important in some applications.

In the 2020 COVID-19 pandemic, plastic adapters and filter-holders were 3D-printed in large quantities. These fit on common masks originally made to take proprietary filters (the type shown below). The adapters hold circles cut out of surgical masks, utilizing them as filter discs (as shown above). Six filter discs can be cut from one mask.

Like other proprietary refills, proprietary filter cartridges cause vendor lock-in.

=== Chemical cartridges ===
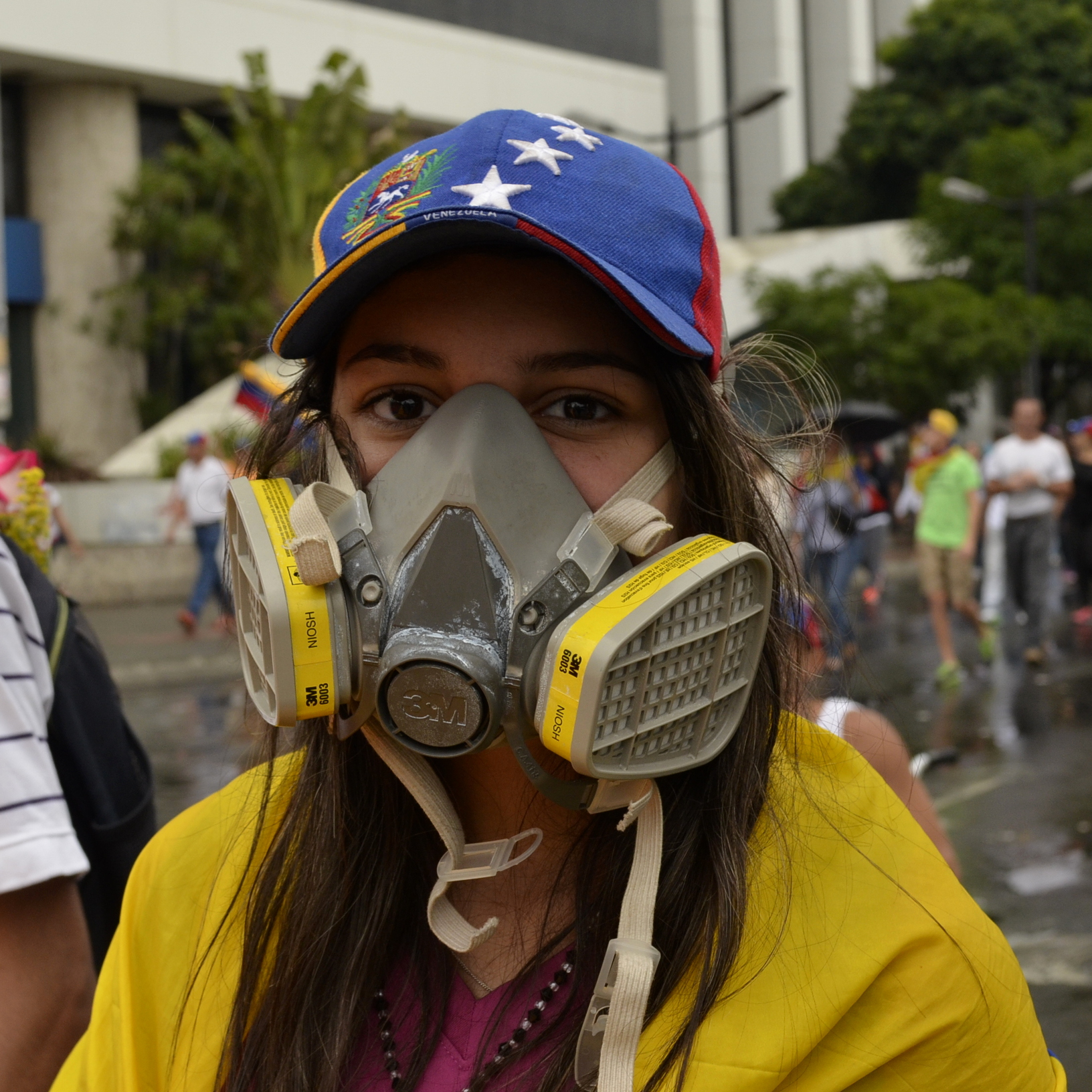
A protester in Venezuela wearing a gas mask, an elastomeric respirator with chemical cartridges.

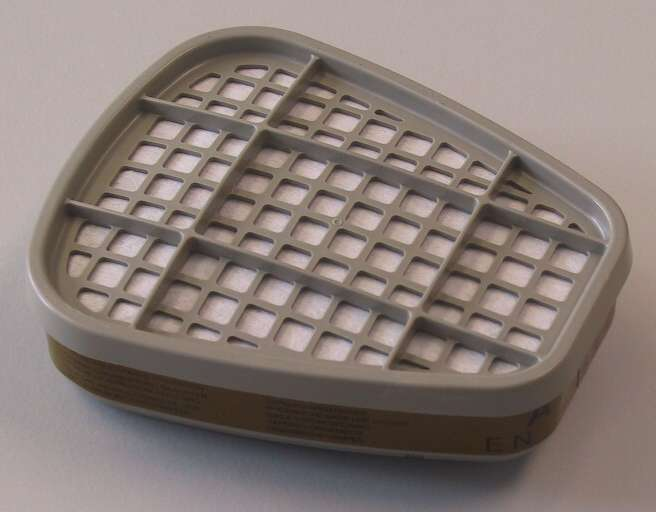
The manufacturer-specific cartridge filter. Colour-coding suggests that this brown-banded cartridge is a different standard from the yellow-banded cartridges the protestor is using.

Different types of cartridge must be used to filter out different chemicals. Most cartridges are made of activated charcoal, which has a very high surface area to adsorb toxins onto. These carbon filters are often impregnated with reagents which react and bond with the specific airborne chemical(s) the cartridge targets. This process is called chemisorption; the reagents bond the toxic gases and vapors before the wearer can breathe them in. The activated carbon may be saturated with copper, zinc, silver and molybdenum compounds, as well as with triethylenediamine (TEDA) Many chemicals cannot be safely filtered out by any chemical cartridge.

Chemical cartridges must generally be kept sealed from the air until use, and will eventually be too old to use even if kept sealed.

Many chemicals bond to the cartridge material fairly irreversibly, through chemisorption. But some adsorbed organic vapours may only bond weakly and reversibly (for example methanol). These organic vapours, especially the more volatile ones, may desorb from the filter and diffuse through the cartridge while it is not in use, such that they may be breathed by the wearer when they begin to use the cartridge again. For this reason, cartridges used against organic vapours are single-use, unless experimental evidence shows that desorbtion-caused breakthrough after a storage period is not a problem for the specific organic vapours in question.

Chemical cartridges must be replaced when they no longer have the ability to absorb the toxic chemicals, a point which is determined by a qualified industrial hygienist. Cartridge service life is dependent on many factors, including contaminant type and concentrations, interference from other chemicals, breathing rates, whether respirator use is continuous or intermittent, sorption capacity of the cartridges, and environmental factors like humidity and temperature. There is active research into making more types of chemical cartridge with an end-of-service-life indicator (ESLI), which indicates to the user when the cartridge has expired. ESLIs may be moisture-dependent, in which case relying on them for use in dry atmospheres could cause dangerously high exposures.

== Traits ==
Use of respirators in the workplace; see minutes 6:47-8:20 for elastomeric respirators, and 10:10-14:30 for filter types.

Air-purifying respirators cannot be used in oxygen-deficient atmospheres (less than 19.5% oxygen). Nor can they be used in atmospheres with a contaminant concentration that may be immediately dangerous to life or health, or in unknown atmospheres. In these cases air-supplying respirators must be used. If concentrations of hazardous particulates or gasses that are greater than the occupational exposure limit, U.S. regulations require that respirators be worn, but they may also be worn at lower concentrations. Similar mandatory legal requirements apply to employers in many other countries (examples). The respirator must have a sufficient assigned protection factor (APF) for the conditions.

Respirators are rated by APF; higher APFs protect more
Type	APF	protects from
Disposable filtering facepiece respirators	10-30	particulates only
Half-mask elastomeric respirators	10-30	both particulates and gasses
Full-face-mask elastomeric respirators	50	both particulates and gasses
Loose-hood PAPRs	25 or 50	both particulates and gasses
Elastomeric PAPRs	1000	both particulates and gasses
Supplied-air respirators (SARs)	10-2000	both particulates and gasses
Self-contained breathing apparatus (SCBAs)	50-10 000	both particulates and gasses

Elastomeric masks may fail to protect if they are not donned before entering a hazardous environment. Other problems include using a size other than the size the wearer was fit-tested on, using the wrong sort of cartridge, re-using a cartridge that is no longer good, not doing a positive- and negative-pressure seal check each time the mask is donned, failing to test the respirator (and perhaps inhaling the carbon from a broken cartridge), and even putting the nose-clip up the nose rather than using it to pinch the nose shut.

=== Fit ===
A CDC guide to facial hair and respirators

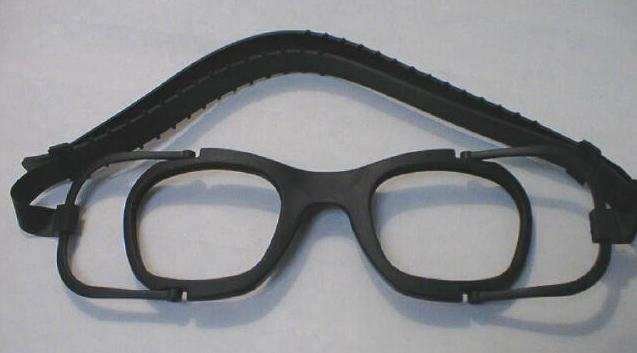
Mask-compatible eyeglasses, with flat elastomeric straps, to avoid interfering with the seal

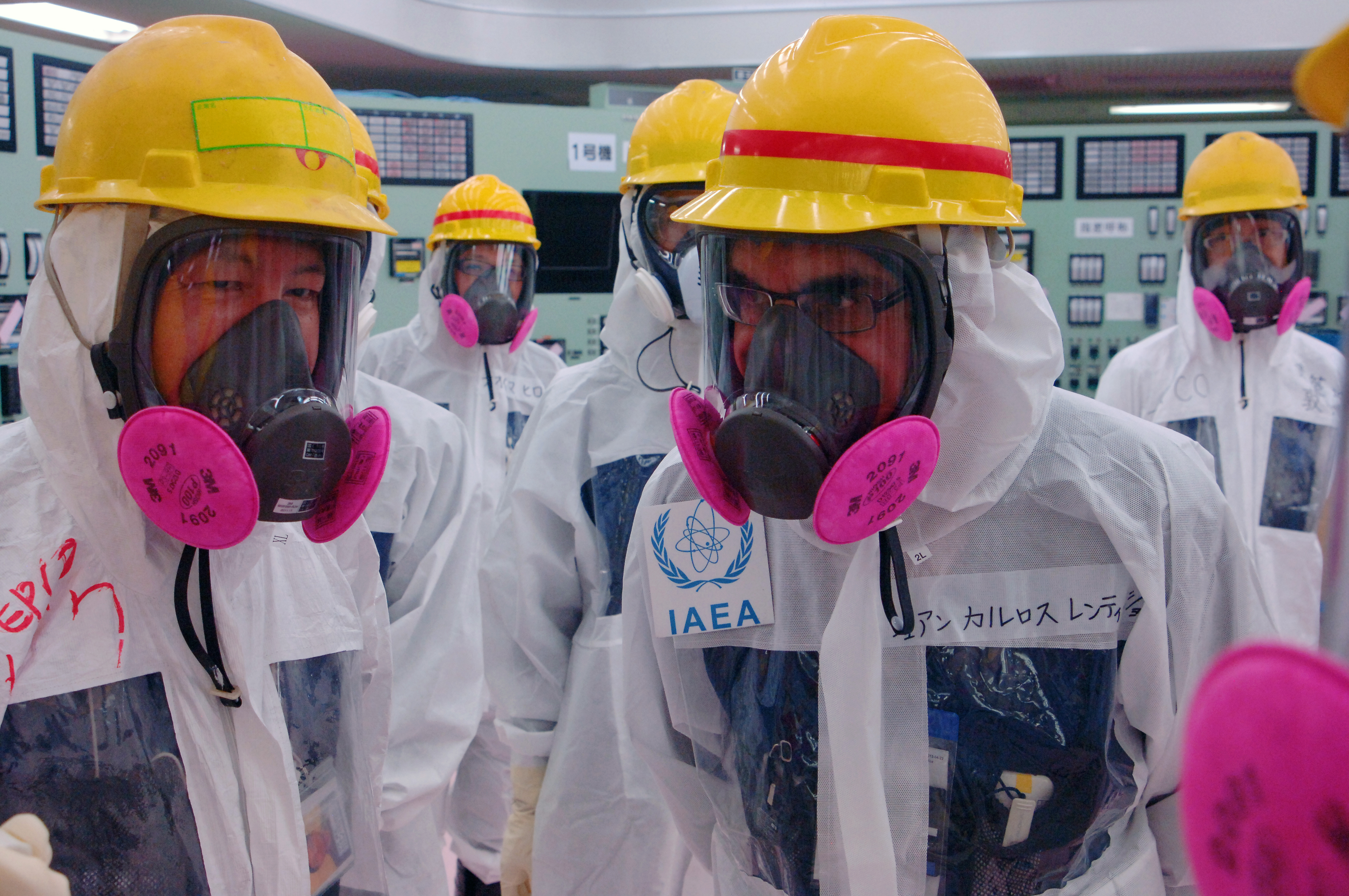
Elastomeric full-face masks being worn with standard eyeglasses.

Fit is critical to the protection provided by elastomeric respirators. Elastomeric masks must be individually fit-tested and inspected for full efficacy. They may be somewhat easier to fit than filtering facepiece respirators. Older mask designs were designed only to fit young adult men of average weight and a narrow range of ethnicities; newer ones use updated anthropometry and fit more people.

Limited research suggests that elastomeric respirators may have better fitting characteristics than disposable filtering-facepiece respirators, fitting a broader variety of faces, and thus being more likely to seal well when the user has not done a formal fit test. Available evidence also suggests that as a class, elastomeric respirators may leak less, and their seals are less likely to become damaged. Elastomeric respirators have wider straps which slip less, individually-adjustable straps, and wider, softer, more flexible seals (see image below); these may help reduce leaks.

Full-face elastomeric respirators generally seal better. For substances hazardous to the eyes, a respirator equipped with a full facepiece, helmet, or hood is recommended.

Eyeglasses can clash with elastomeric masks. Conventionally, full-face masks are modified, with prescription lenses inserted into the mask. Glasses can be worn over a half-mask, as long as they do not interfere with the seal or headstraps. Some users find this uncomfortable. Wearing contacts is not possible where there is a risk of solvent vapours, and may not be advisable if there is an infection risk, but otherwise contacts can be worn.

Facial hair underneath the seal is also a problem. Piercings, jewelry, heavy cosmetics, and some creases and scars can also interfere with sealing.

Straps may stretch slightly over time on some models.

=== Communication ===
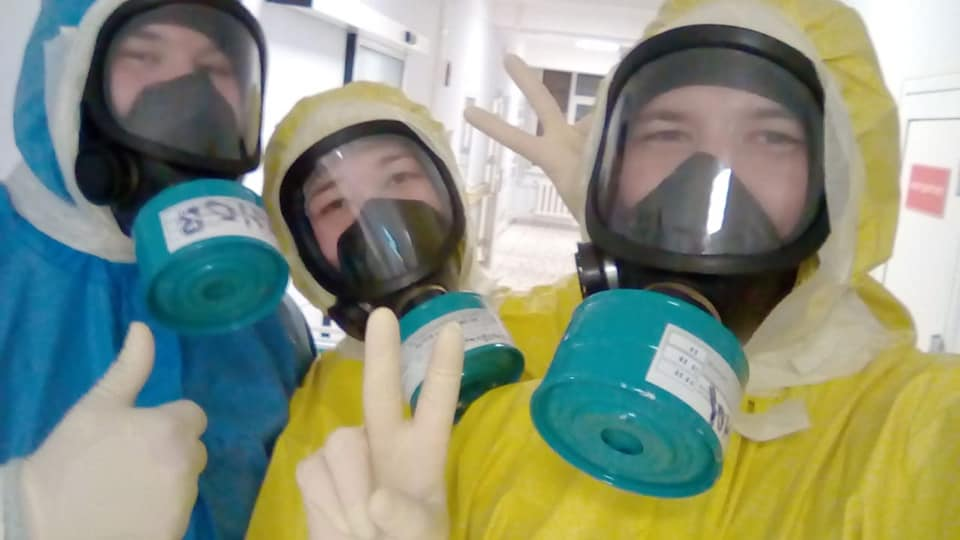
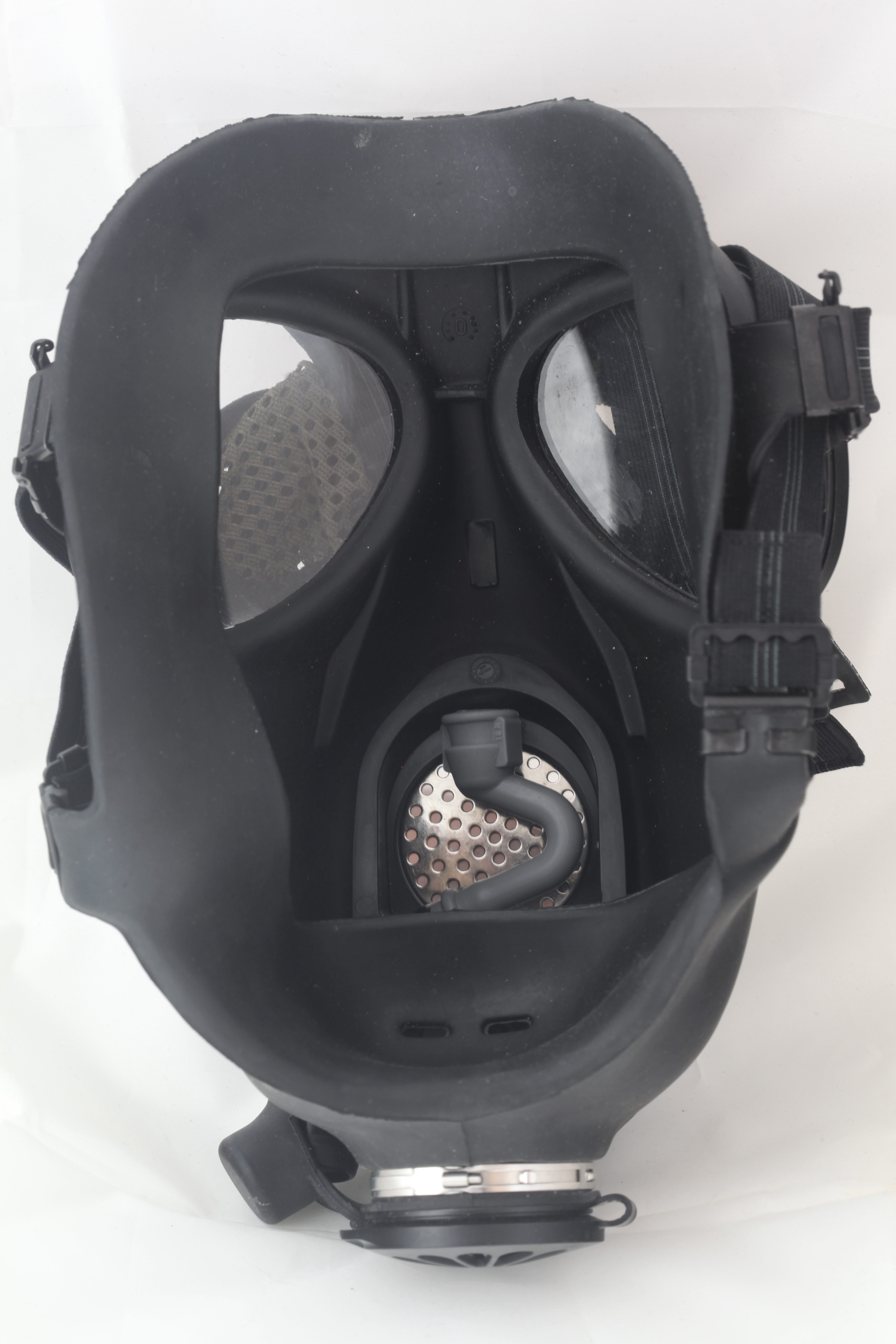
Left, Communicating with gestures, in a Russian hospital treating COVID-19 cases. Right, inside a Swiss military respirator, internal mask removed (replaced). The shiny metal shields a membrane for transmitting sounds. The item under the chin is an exhalation valve. The filter is attached to a third port between them, not visible here (outside view).

It is harder to understand the speech of someone wearing most types of elastomeric respirator. This can be dangerous in some environments. Some commercially available respirators include sound-transmitting diaphragms and/or transparent windows giving a view of the mouth, to improve communication efficiency. Designs that allow the jaw to move more freely may also help. Electronic voice relays, from inside the mask or from a throat microphone, have also been used.

Elastomeric respirators without these modifications muffle the wearer's speech more than filtering facepiece respirators (FFRs) such as N95 respirators. In some studies, this was a major reason why healthcare workers preferred to wear FFRs.

=== Comfort ===
Extended or off-label use of certain negative-pressure respirators, like a filtering facepiece respirator paired with a surgical mask, can result in higher levels of carbon dioxide from dead space and breathing resistance (pressure drop) which can impact functioning and sometimes can exceed the PEL. This effect was significantly reduced with powered air purifying respirators. In various surveys among healthcare workers, headaches, dermatitis and acne have been reported.

Sweat does not evaporate as easily from under a mask; elastomeric respirators may be more hot and humid than FFRs. Heavier respirators cause more fatigue. More breathing resistance causes more fatigue, and makes the wearer more likely to feel out-of-breath or claustrophobic. Tight straps, on any type of respirator, are reported to put pressure on the sinuses and cause headaches.

=== Exhalation valves ===
Some masks have exhalation valve that let the exhaled air go out unfiltered. The certification grade of the mask (such as N95) is about the mask itself and it does not warrant any safety about the air that is expelled by the wearer through the valve. A mask with valve mainly increases the comfort of the wearer.

== Uses ==
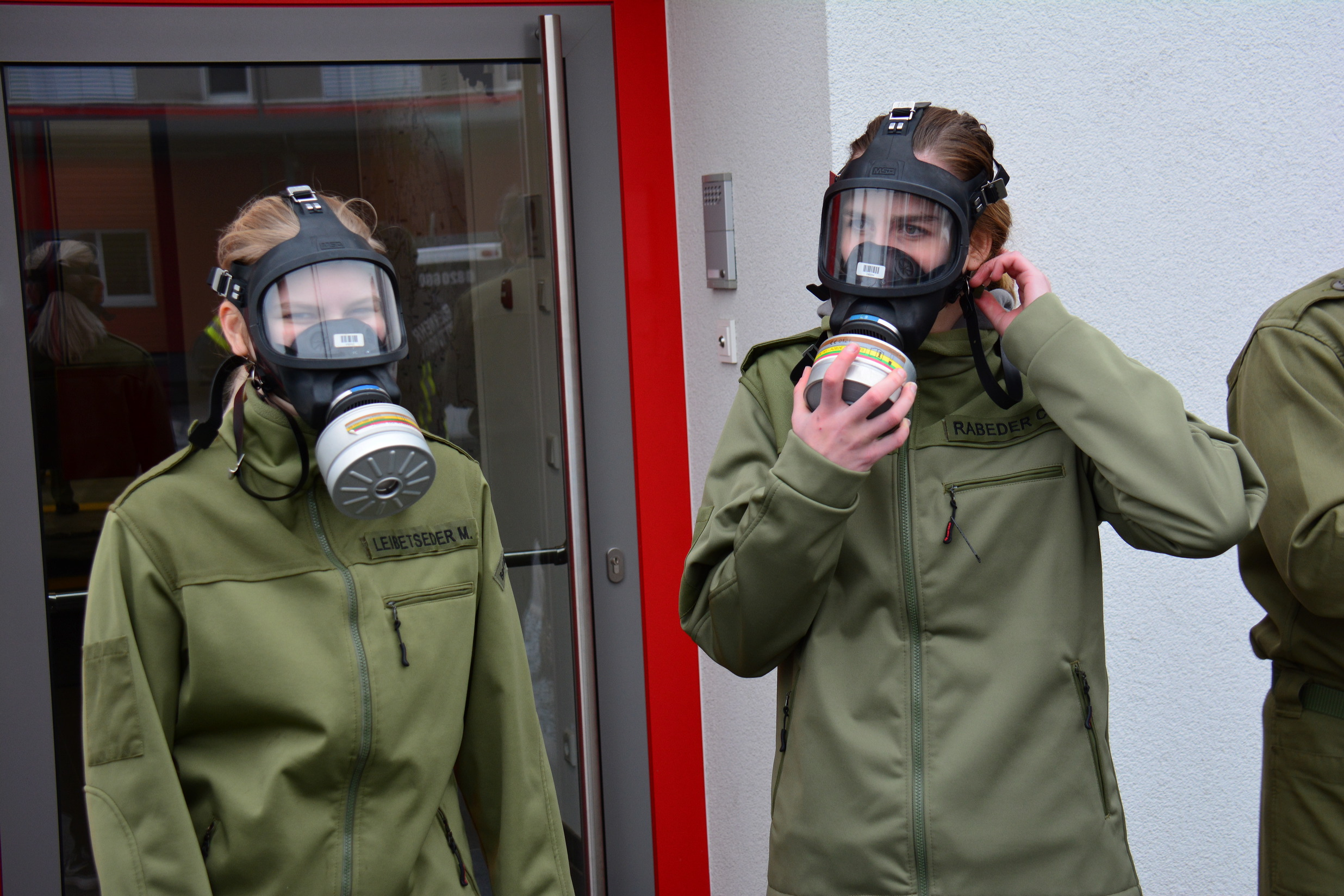
Firefighters testing elastomeric respirators, for light use in non-oxygen-deficient environments

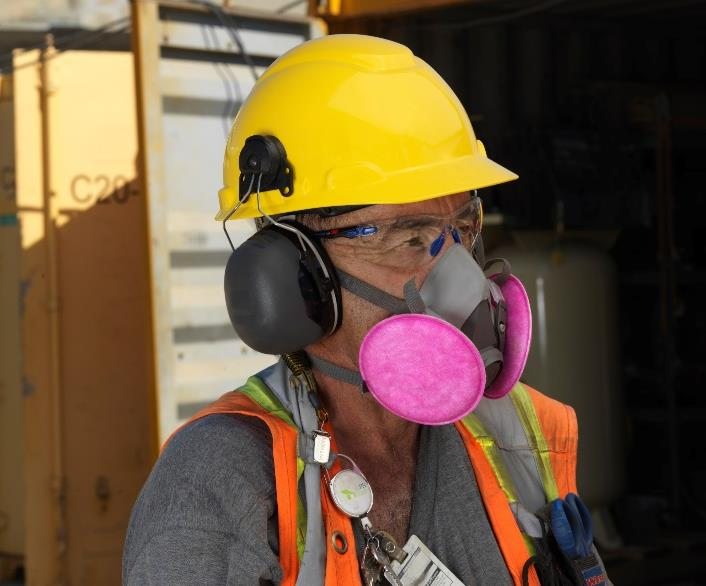
Elastomeric masks are part of the equipment worn in mining

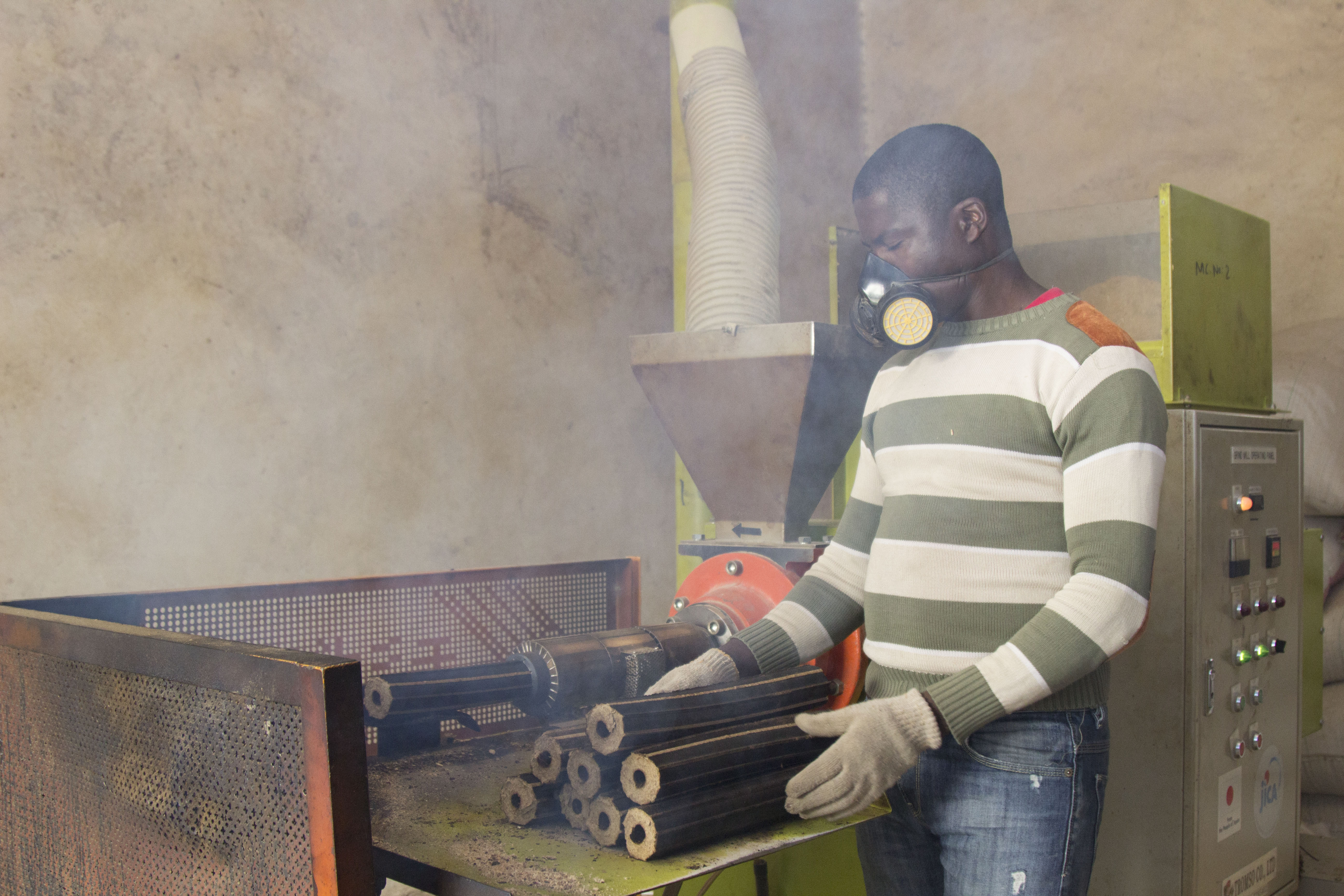
Making logs from rice chaff

First responders may use elastomeric respirators, including during smoke simulation exercises. Air-purifying respirators are not effective during firefighting, in oxygen-deficient atmosphere, or in an unknown atmosphere; in these situations an air-supplying respirator such as a self-contained breathing apparatus is recommended instead.

The CDC has been recommending elastomeric respirators be used to protect people from droplet and airborne transmission of deadly viruses since 1992.

Gas masks are extensively used in mining and construction. They are used against paint vapors, solvents, silica dust, and other hazardous particles and gasses. Masons and carpenters use them against dusts and adhesives.

Elastomeric respirators may be used to protect against welding fumes. Different welding processes may produce different fumes, both particles and gasses such as carbon monoxide. Oxygen displacement by otherwise-harmless shielding gasses is also a risk. A self-contained breathing apparatus may be needed. Respirators used by welders must fit under a welding mask.

Respirators are also used in demolition to protect against asbestos, mould, and other hazardous waste.

Elastomeric respirators are used for cleaning up after oil spills.

Elastomeric respirators are used against chemical aerosols and toxic gases. They are used in the chemical industry when handling hazardous materials; workers are usually issued escape respirators as a precaution against leaks. Workers are instructed to put their mask on and leave immediately to sound the alarm if they detect a leak. Other respirators may be used for making repairs to leaking equipment.

Elastomeric respirators may be worn in agriculture, for instance when using agricultural chemicals, solvents, fish meal, silage, mold spores and dust.

Manufacturing also uses elastomeric respirators, for instance on assembly lines. Elastomeric respirators are worn by many employees in the nuclear industry.

=== Medical use ===
A CDC video on the use of elastomeric respirators in healthcare

Elastomeric respirators were first used to keep health care workers safe from tuberculosis in the mid-1990s. The CDC has long recommended health care workers use elastomeric respirators during pandemics to keep themselves safe from droplet and airborne transmission. The CDC recommended health care workers use elastomeric respirators for protection from SARS in 2003, H1N1 in 2009 and COVID-19 in April 2020.

The possibility of wider use during pandemics was being investigated in the US in 2017. In 2017, CDC scientist Lew Radonovich presented the CDC plan to put elastomeric respirators into widespread use during pandemics. In September 2019, Lew Radonovich and the CDC presented the plan to put elastomeric respirators in to widespread use during pandemics at the AOHP Nation conference in Baltimore. In medical use, the elastomeric portions of the mask must also be cleaned and disinfected, as some germs can survive on them for weeks. Conventionally, the filter cartridges are discarded.

Filter cartridges can be hard to find amidst shortages. In emergency situations, if the filters are unclogged and unsoiled but contaminated with germs, the filters could be sterilized and re-used, although the filtration efficiency may be degraded by some forms of disinfection. As of 2020, the available filter materials would be damaged by being dipped or submerged in cleaning fluid, but the outside of the filter cartridges can be cleaned and disinfected by wipes (pancake-style filters cannot be disinfected). During the COVID-19 pandemic, public health authorities issued guidelines on how to save, disinfect and reuse standard mechanical filters, warning against the disinfection methods that damaged filtration efficiency.

Limited research failed to find evidence that elastomeric respirators caused more patient anxiety than FFR masks, including in children and disoriented patients. A single air-filtering elastomeric respirator cost about as much as 40 disposable filtering facepiece respirators, and a medical worker uses about 20 disposable masks per day, according to a 2018 publication. The particulate cartridges cost about as much as six disposable masks. (Note: Respirator cost 30-35 dollars ($19-33 for another mask), ~20 disposable masks/day at $17 per 20. $5–$6.50 per P100 cartridge.) Air-supplying respirators may be easier for hospital personnel to use; they can be worn for longer periods.

=== Source control ===
Unfiltered exhalation of air is found on both filtering facepiece and elastomeric respirators with exhalation valves. Unfiltered air is also found on powered air-purifying respirators, which cannot ever filter exhaled air. During the COVID-19 pandemic, masks with unfiltered-exhalation valves ran counter to the requirements of some mandatory mask orders. Despite the aforementioned belief, a 2020 research by the NIOSH and CDC shows that an uncovered exhalation valve already provides source control on a level similar to, or even better than, surgical masks.

It is possible to seal some unfiltered exhalation valves or to cover it with an additional surgical mask; this might be done where mask shortages make it necessary. However, so long as there are no shortages, respirators without exhalation valves should still be preferred in situations where source control is necessary.

=== CBRN defense ===
Elastomeric respirators may be used for protection from chemical, biological, radiological, and nuclear agents (CBRN). Some elastomeric respirators are specifically certified for such use.

Gas masks were initially widely used in chemical warfare, against the effects of war gas. Chemical and biological weapons are prohibited by customary international humanitarian law, in international and non-international conflicts. Use is considered a war crime.

During demonstrations and protests where tear gas (such as CS gas) is employed by riot police, gas masks are commonly used by police and demonstrators alike. Journalists covering these events also use respirators, and where use of tear gas spreads into residential areas, even those not on the front lines may buy them. Access to respirators has been restricted by authorities who regard them as tools of resistance, causing circumvention and smuggling.

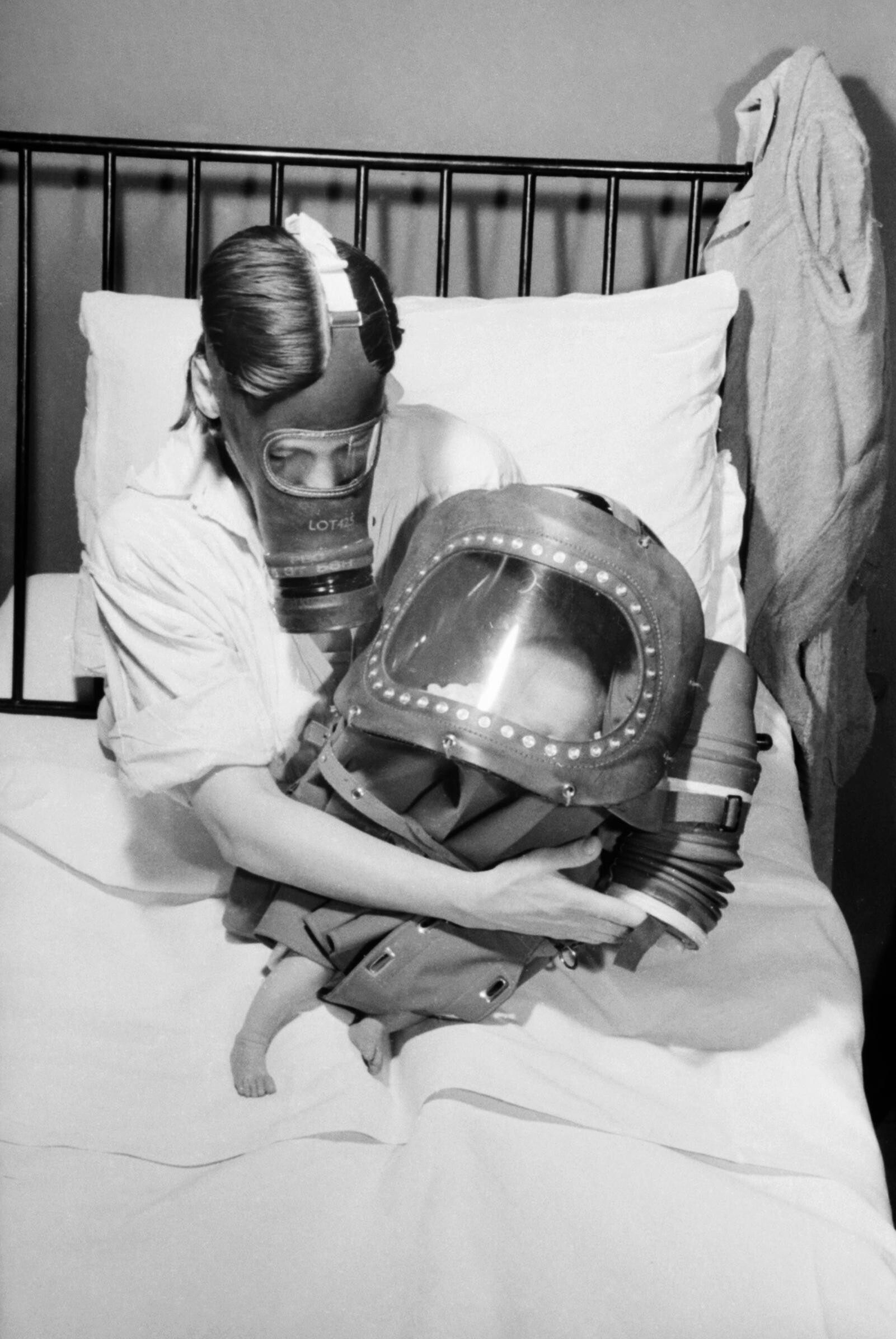
A mother and baby, both in gas masks, during WWII.

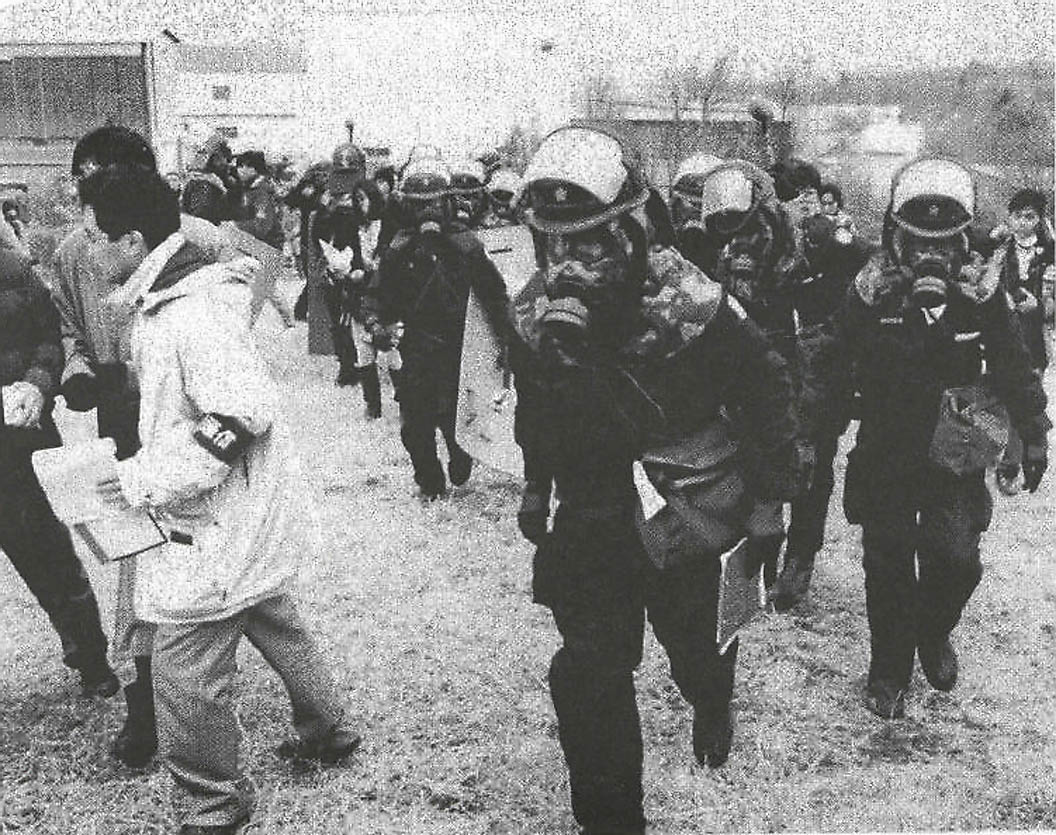
Police officers raid the Aum Shinrikyo headquarters following the Tokyo subway sarin attack in 1995

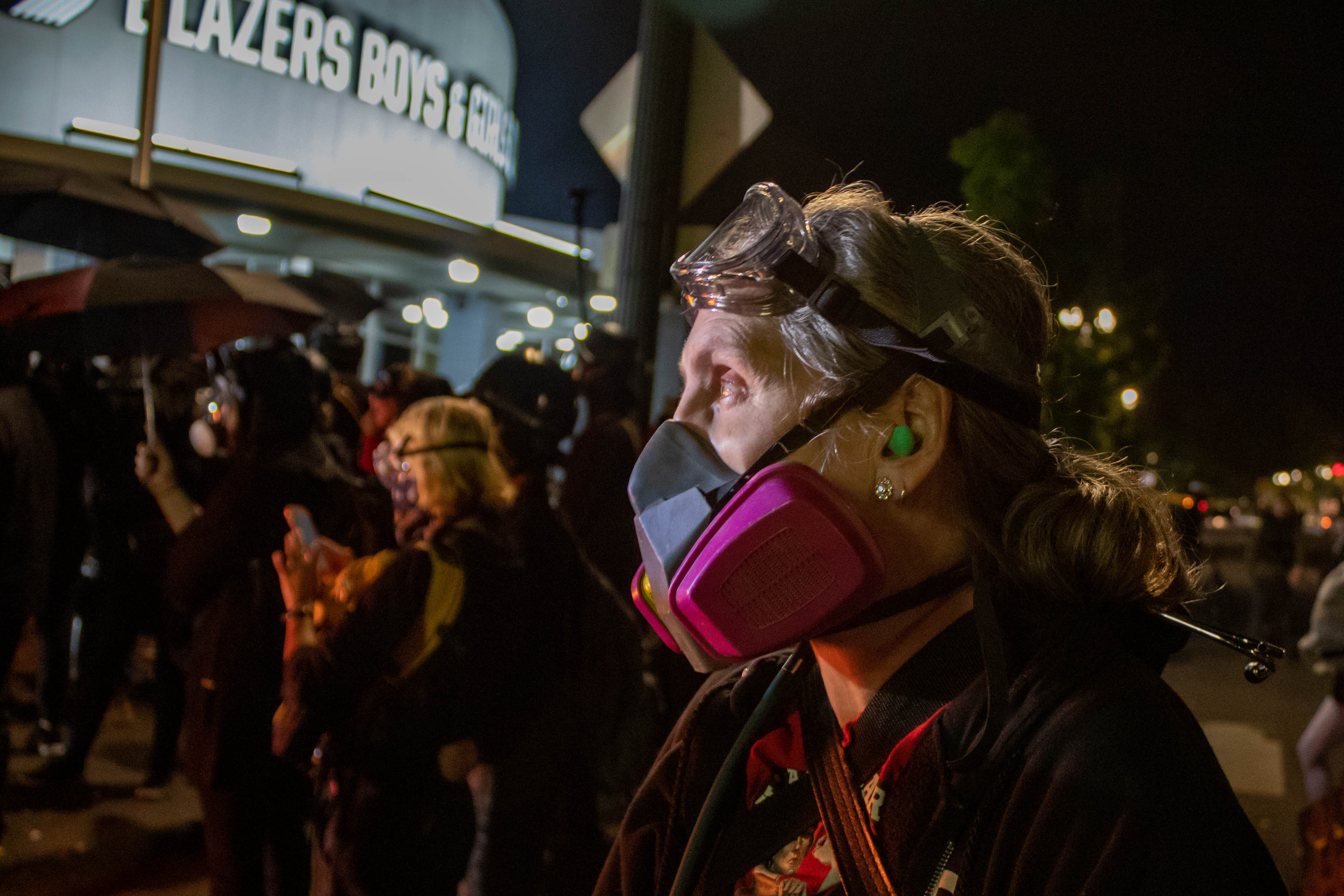
A protester at a demonstration in 2020

== Cleaning and storage ==
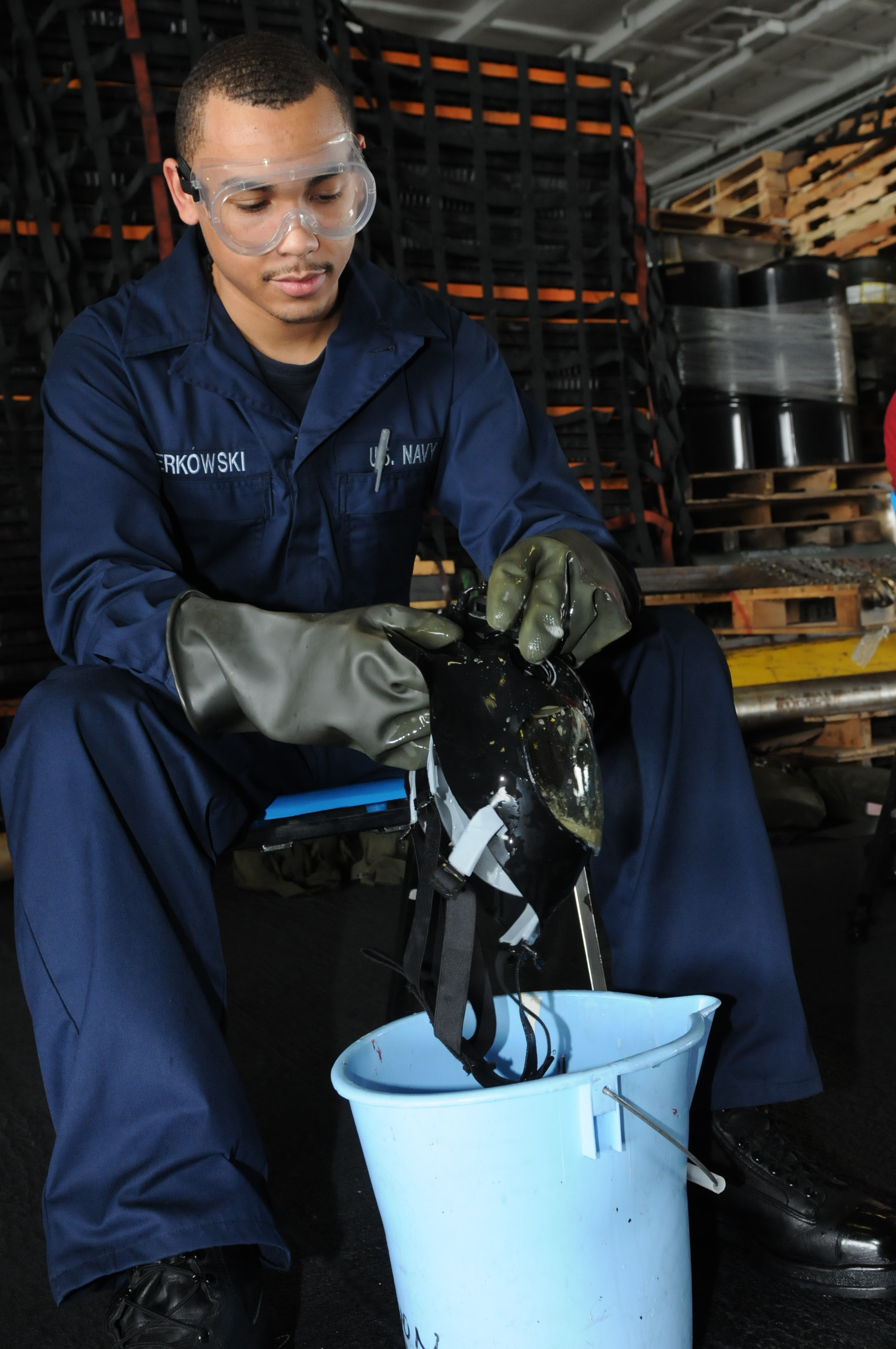
Cleaning a gas mask in the US Navy

Cleaning procedures are specific to the type and material of mask, and are supplied by the manufacturer. They generally involve washing with soap and water or other chemical disinfectants. Some manufacturer instructions have been shown to be much more difficult to understand than reformulated instructions; the lack of standardization also makes cleaning more complicated. Cleaning may be fairly time-consuming, depending on automation and the manufacturer's instructions.

Depending on materials, elastomeric components of masks may be damaged by some cleaning methods (such as acetone, ethanol, strong hypochlorite and iodine solutions, quaternary ammonium salts, ethylene oxide, or temperatures over 50 °C/122 °F). Cleaning by machine is possible, but cleaning can also be done by hand. The filter material may be damaged and lose effectiveness if it comes into contact with cleaning or disinfecting solutions. Manufacturers generally advise throwing it out each time the mask is cleaned, but this may not be possible in shortage situations.

Drying a mask may take hours, depending on design (elastomeric straps are typically dry within half-an-hour, but cloth straps take longer). Masks should never be stored wet. The facepiece and straps should not be stored in a way that will distort them. Well-maintained elastomeric masks can last for years in industrial use. Users may carry their respirator in a shoulderbag for accessibility.

In construction, elastomeric masks are rarer than disposable mechanical filters; the disposable masks are preferentially issued because supervisors prefer to avoid cleaning and storage. In industry, when there are few workers, each may be responsible for their own permanently-assigned mask; where there are more workers, there may be a dedicated staff who maintain and reprocess respirators.

== In popular culture ==
Elastomeric respirators may be used by graffiti taggers using aerosol paint canisters.

They are also used by urban explorers venturing into environments where materials such as radioactive particles or asbestos may be present.

Aside from serving their functional purposes, gas masks are also used as fashion in cybergoth wear. They are also used as emblems by some musicians.

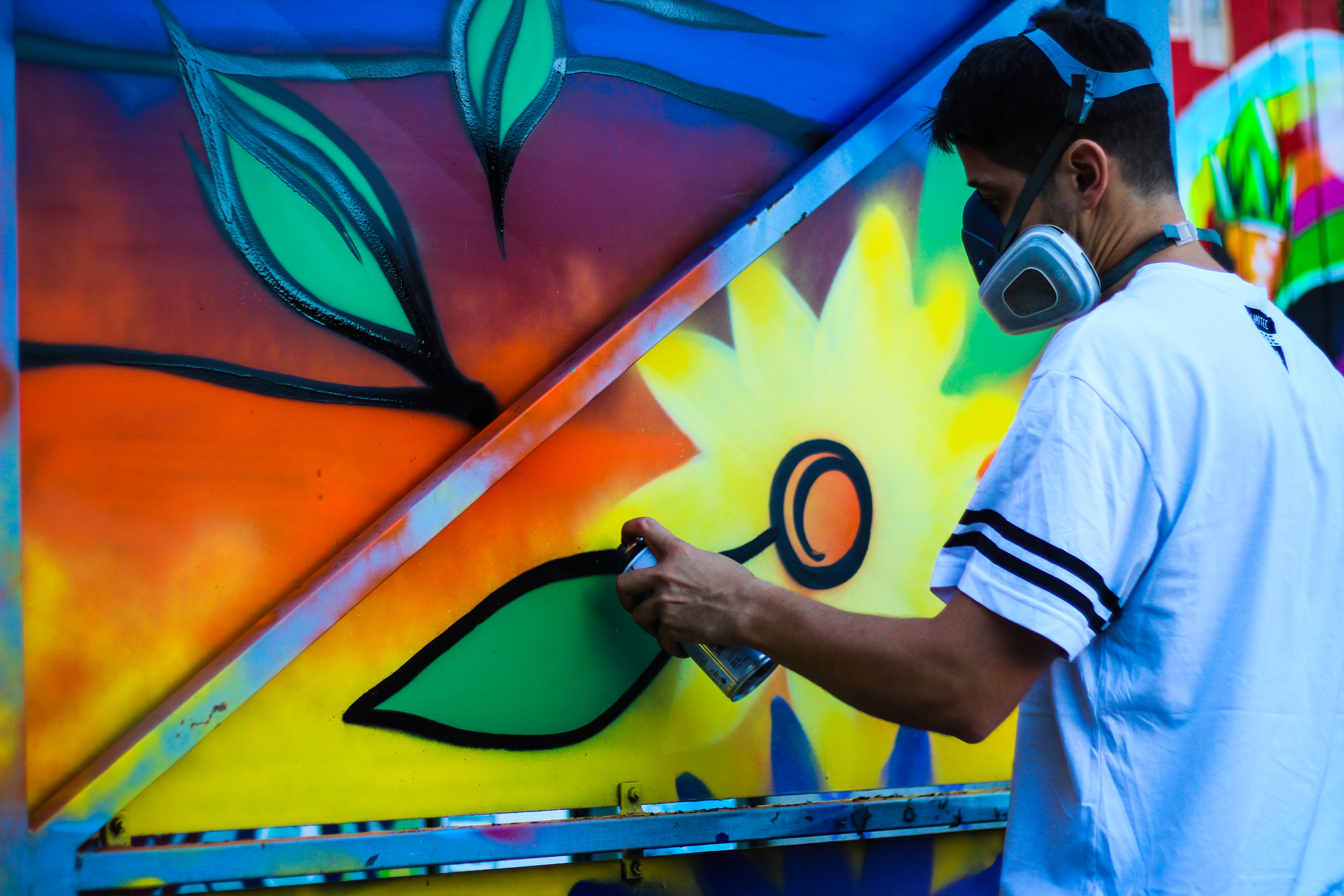
Spray-painting flowers in an elastomeric respirator

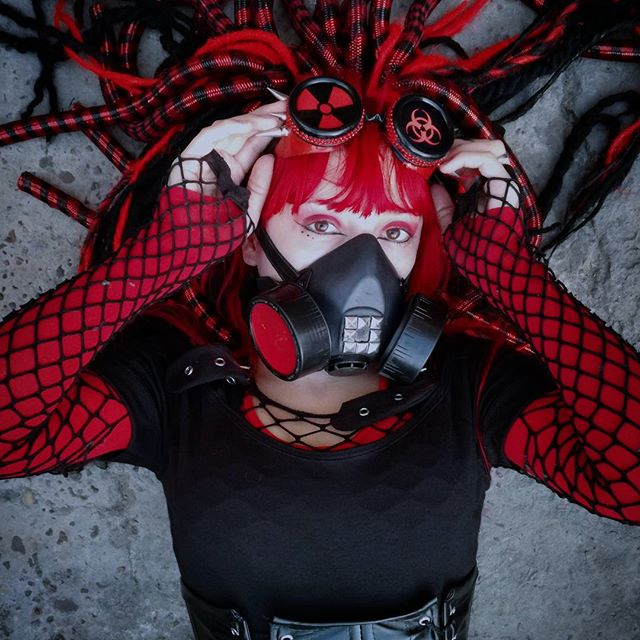
A respirator as part of a dancer's cybergoth outfit.

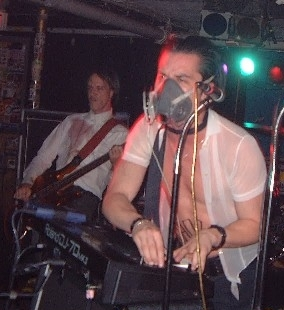
A singer, Mike Patton, performing in an elastomeric respirator (but without its filter cartridges) in 2002. Note microphone.

== See also ==
- Respirator for other types of respirators
  - Air-purifying respirators like elastomeric respirators are somewhat less protective than some air-supplying respirators.
  - A powered air-purifying respirator is an elastomeric mask with a battery-powered fan to force air in (except loose-fitting PAPRs)
- Chemical cartridge for chemical filters used with elastomeric respirators
- Mechanical filter respirator for other types of particulate filters
- Respirator fit test
