= Mechanical filter (respirator) =

Air-filtering face masks or mask attachments

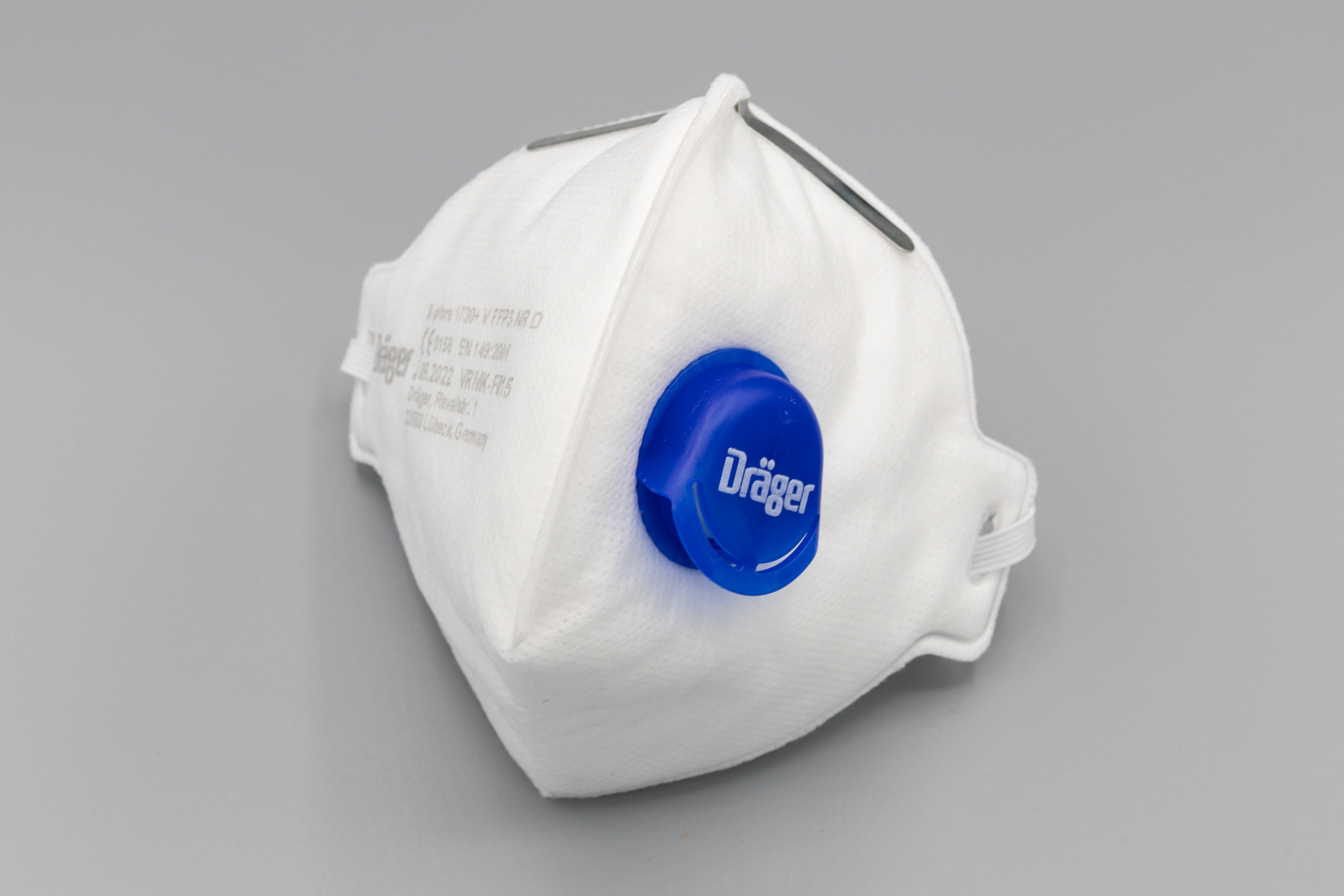
- Face mask (filtering facepiece respirator) FFP3 with exhalation valve
- Regulation: 42 CFR 84, EN 149, EN 143
- NIOSH schedule: TC-84A, TC-21C
- [edit on Wikidata]

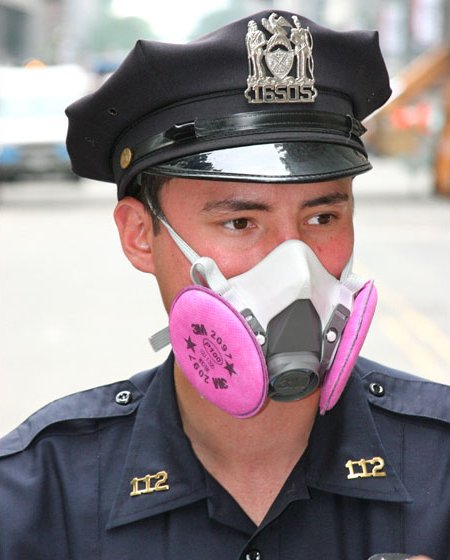
Filtering half mask, reusable elastomeric respirator with pink replaceable pancake filters and grey exhalation valve

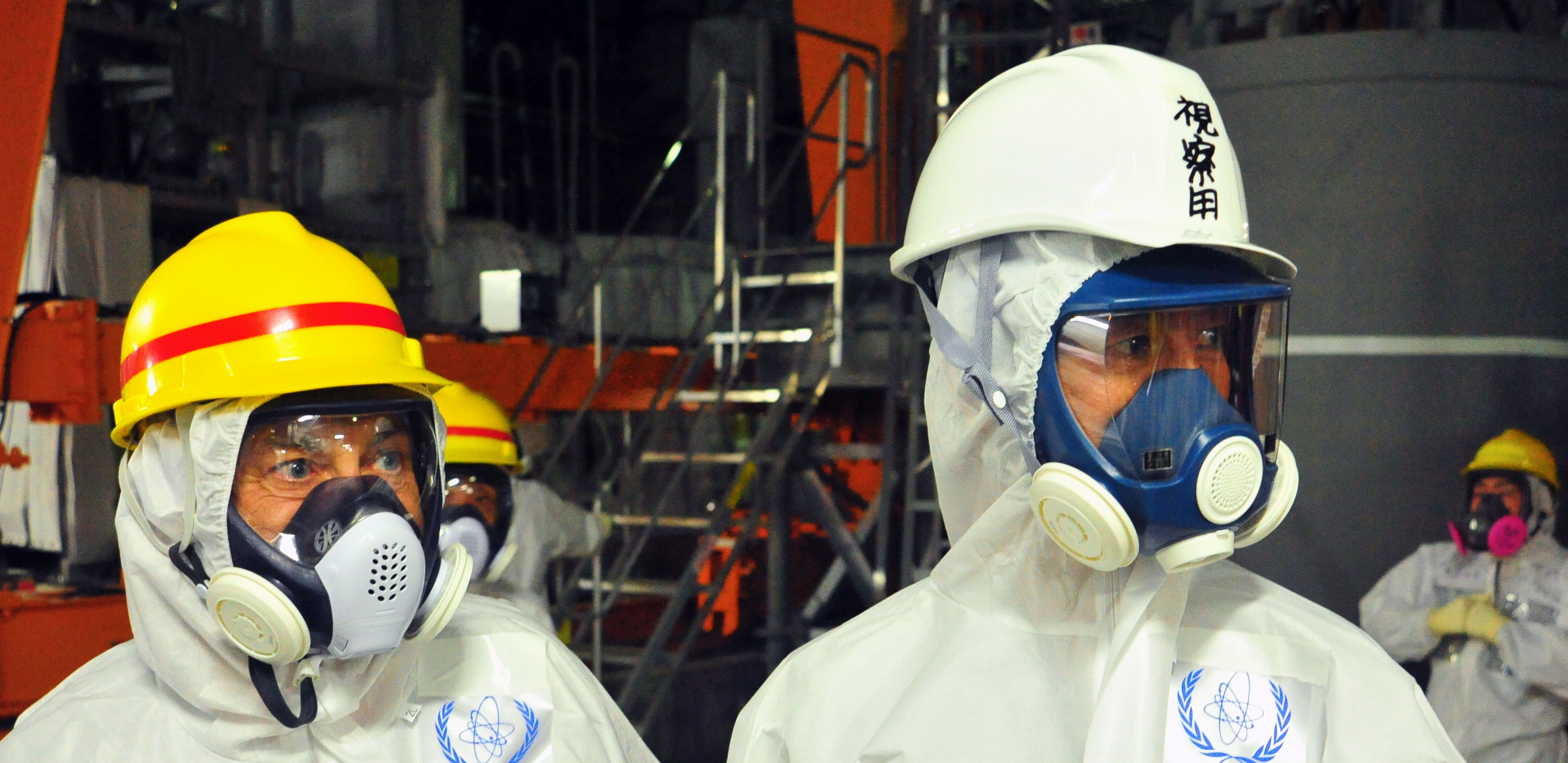
Full-face elastomeric respirators seal better.

Mechanical filters, a part of particulate respirators, are a class of filter for air-purifying respirator masks that mechanically stops particulates from reaching the wearer's nose and mouth. They come in multiple physical forms.

== Mechanism of operation ==
Small particles zigzag due to Brownian motion, and are easily captured (diffusion). Large particles get strained out (interception), or have too much inertia to turn, and hit a fiber (impaction). Mid-size particles follow flowlines and are more likely to get through the filter; the hardest size to filter is 0.3 microns diameter.

Filter mechanisms

Mechanical filter respirators retain particulate matter such as dust created during woodworking or metal processing, when contaminated air is passed through the filter material. Wool is still used today as a filter, along with plastic, glass, cellulose, and combinations of two or more of these materials. Since the filters cannot be cleaned and reused and have a limited lifespan, cost and disposability are key factors. Single-use, disposable and replaceable-cartridge models exist.

Mechanical filters remove contaminants from air in the following ways:

1. by interception when particles following a line of flow in the airstream come within one radius of a fiber and adhere to it;
2. by impaction, when larger particles unable to follow the curving contours of the airstream are forced to embed in one of the fibers directly; this increases with diminishing fiber separation and higher air flow velocity
3. by an enhancing mechanism called diffusion, where gas molecules collide with the smallest particles, especially those below 100 nm in diameter, which are thereby impeded and delayed in their path through the filter; this effect is similar to Brownian motion and increases the probability that particles will be stopped by either of the two mechanisms above; it becomes dominant at lower air flow velocities
4. by using electret filter material (usually, electrospun plastic fibers) to attract or repel particles with an electrostatic charge, so that they are more likely to collide with the filter surface
5. by the particles themselves, which plug the filter and increase filtration efficiency

More obscure mechanisms include:

1. by using certain coatings on the fibers that kill or deactivate infectious particles colliding with them (such as salt)
2. by using gravity and allowing particles to settle into the filter material (this effect is typically negligible)

Considering only particulates carried on an air stream and a fiber mesh filter, diffusion predominates below the 0.1 μm diameter particle size. Impaction and interception predominate above 0.4 μm. In between, near the most penetrating particle size of 0.3 μm, diffusion and interception predominate.

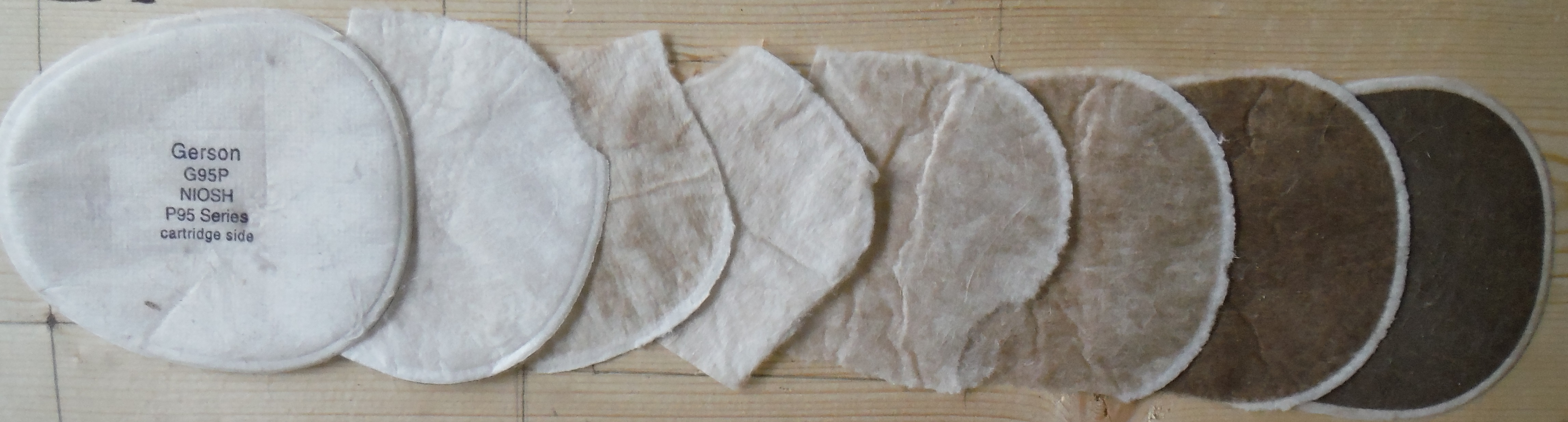
Cross-section of NIOSH-approved P95 filters used in metalworking operations. Even "clean" industrial processes often generate large amounts of harmful particulate matter and require breathing protection.

=== Materials ===
Mechanical filters can be made of a fine mesh of synthetic polymer fibers. The fibers are produced by melt blowing. The fibers are charged as they are blown to produce an electret, and then layered to form a nonwoven polypropylene fabric.

== Uses ==
=== Filtering facepiece respirators ===
Filtering facepiece respirators consist mainly of the mechanical filtration medium itself, and are discarded when they become unusable due to damage, dirt, or excessive breathing resistance. Filtering facepieces are typically simple, light, single-piece, half-face masks and employ the first three mechanical filter mechanisms in the list above to remove particulates from the air stream. The most common of these is the white, disposable standard N95 variety; another type is the Surgical N95 mask. It is discarded after single use or some extended period depending on the contaminant. NIOSH recommends not reusing filtering facepieces in biosafety level 2 or 3 laboratories.

=== Elastomeric respirators ===
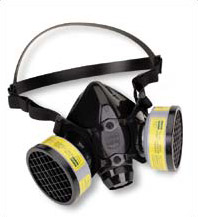
A half-face elastomeric air-purifying respirator. This kind of respirator is reusable, with the filters being replaced periodically.

Elastomeric respirators, also called reusable air-purifying respirators, seal to the face with elastomeric material, which may be a natural or synthetic rubber. They are generally reusable. Full-face versions of elastomeric respirators seal better and protect the eyes.

Elastomeric respirators consist of a reusable mask that seals to the face, with exchangeable filters. Elastomeric respirators can be used with chemical cartridge filters that remove gases, mechanical filters that retain particulate matter, or both. As particulate filters, they are comparable (or, due to the quality and error-tolerance of the elastomeric seal, possibly superior) to filtering facepiece respirators such as most disposable N95 respirators and FFP masks.

=== Powered air-purifying respirators (PAPRs) ===
A powered air-purifying respirator (PAPR) is a type of respirator used to safeguard workers against contaminated air. PAPRs consist of a headgear-and-fan assembly that takes ambient air contaminated with one or more type of pollutant or pathogen, actively removes (filters) a sufficient proportion of these hazards, and then delivers the clean air to the user's face or mouth and nose. They have a higher assigned protection factor than filtering facepiece respirators such as N95 masks. PAPRs are sometimes called positive-pressure masks, blower units, or just blowers.

== Filtration standards ==
=== U.S. standards (N95 and others) ===
A video describing N95 certification testing

Under the current revision of Part 84 established in 1995, NIOSH established nine classifications of approved particulate filtering respirators based on a combination of the respirator series and efficiency level. The first part of the filter's classification indicates the series using the letters N, R, or P to indicate the filter's resistance to filtration efficiency degradation when exposed to oil-based or oil-like aerosols (e.g., lubricants, cutting fluids, glycerine, etc.).^{[CF2]}^{[N2]} Definitions and intended use for each series is indicated below.

- N for not resistant to oil. Used when oil particulates are not present. Tested using sodium chloride particles.
- R for resistant to oil. Used when oil particulates are present and the filter is disposed of after one shift. Tested using dioctyl phthalate (DOP) oil particles.
- P for oil-proof. Used when oil particulates are present and the filter is re-used for more than one shift. Tested with DOP oil particles.

The second value indicates the minimum efficiency level of the filter. When tested according to the protocol established by NIOSH each filter classification must demonstrate the minimum efficiency level indicated below.

NIOSH particulate respirator class minimum efficiency levels^{[CF2]}
Particulate	Respirator class	Minimum efficiency level	Permitted for TB	Permitted for asbestos
NaCl (N) or DOP (R,P)	N95, R95, P95	95%	Yes	No
NaCl (N) or DOP (R,P)	N99, R99, P99	99%	Yes	No
NaCl (N) or DOP (R,P)	N100, R100, P100	99.97%	Yes	Yes

All respirator types are permitted for TB.^{[C1]} Class-100 filters can block asbestos.^{[CF1]}^{[S2]} For N type filters, a 200 mg load of NaCl is used, with an undefined service time. For R type filters, a 200 mg of DOP is used, with a defined service time of "one work shift". For P type filters, an indefinite amount of DOP is used until filtration efficiency stabilizes.^{[N2]} P100 filters, under 42 CFR part 84, are the only filters permitted to be magenta in color.

HE (high-efficiency) labeled filters (described in the subsection) are only provided for powered air-purifying respirators. HE-marked filters are 99.97% efficient against 0.3 micron particles and are oil-proof.

Since filters are tested against the by definition most penetrating particle size of 0.3 μm, an APR with a P100 classification would be at least 99.97% efficient at removing particles of this size.^{[N2]} Particles with a size both less than and greater than 0.3 μm may be filtered at an efficiency greater than 99.97%.^{[N2]} However, this may not always be the case, as the most penetrating particle size for N95s was measured to be below 0.1 μm, as opposed to the predicted size of between 0.1 and 0.3 μm.

=== European standards (FFP2 and others) ===
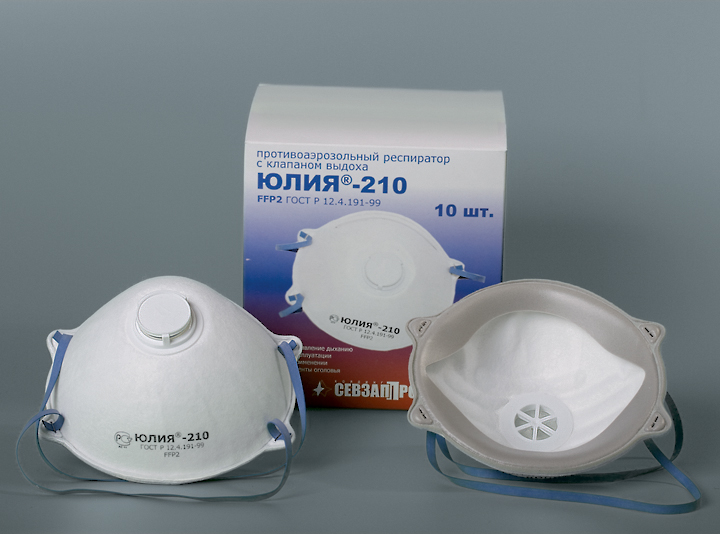
FFP2 masks

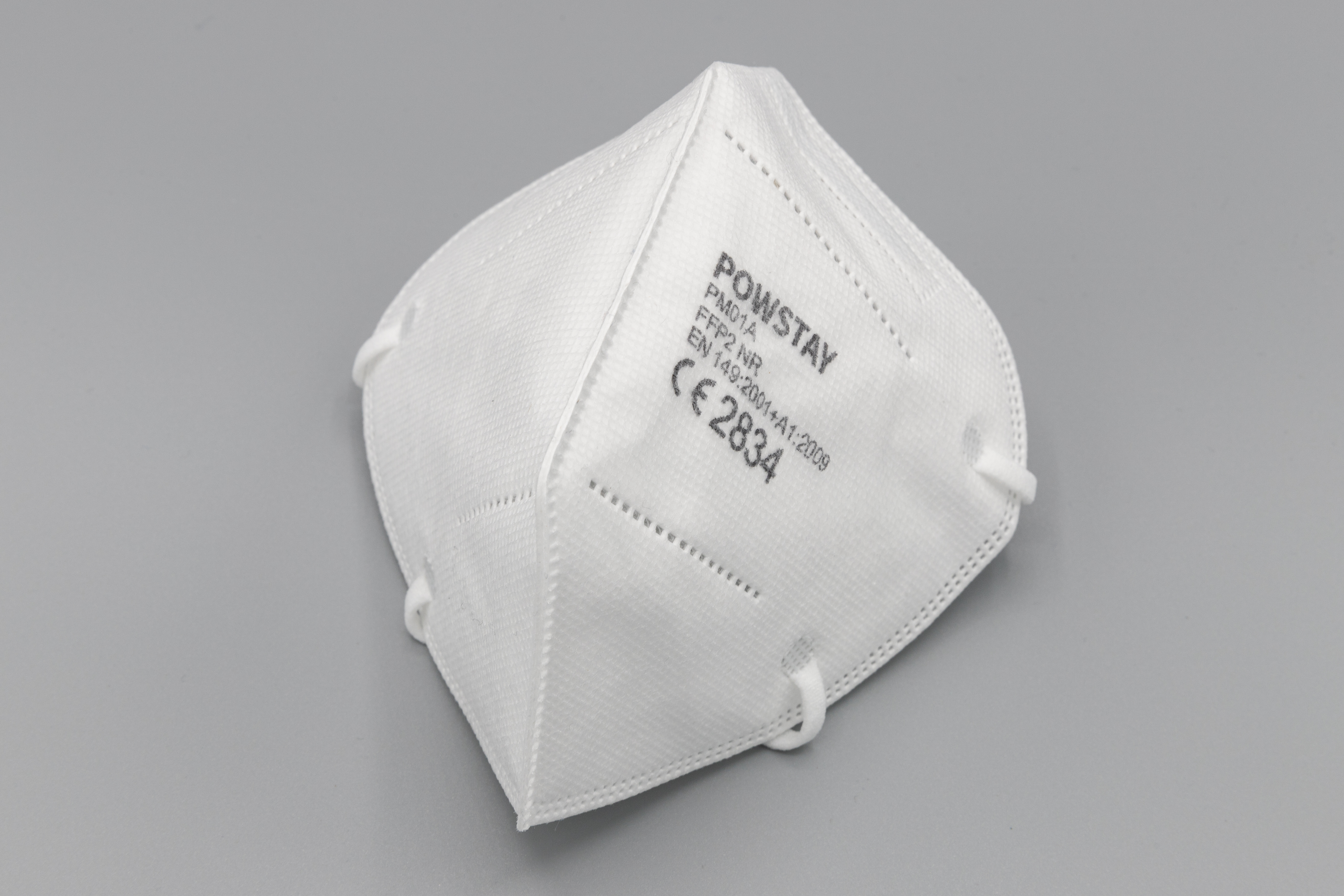
Face mask FFP2 without exhalation valve

The EN 149 standard defines performance requirements for three classes of particle-filtering half masks: FFP1, FFP2 and FFP3. The protection provided by an FFP2 (or FFP3) mask includes the protection provided by a mask of the lower-numbered classes.

A mask conforming to the standard must have its class written on it, along with the name of the standard and its year of publication, as well as any applicable option codes, e.g. “EN 149:2001 FFP1 NR D”. Some manufacturers use in addition the colour of the elastic band to identify the mask class, however, the EN 149 standard does not specify any such colour coding and different manufacturers have used different colour schemes.

Class	Filter penetration limit (at 95 L/min air flow)	Inward leakage	Typical elastic band
FFP1	Filters at least 80% of airborne particles	<22%	Yellow
FFP2	Filters at least 94% of airborne particles	<8%	Blue or White
FFP3	Filters at least 99% of airborne particles	<2%	Red

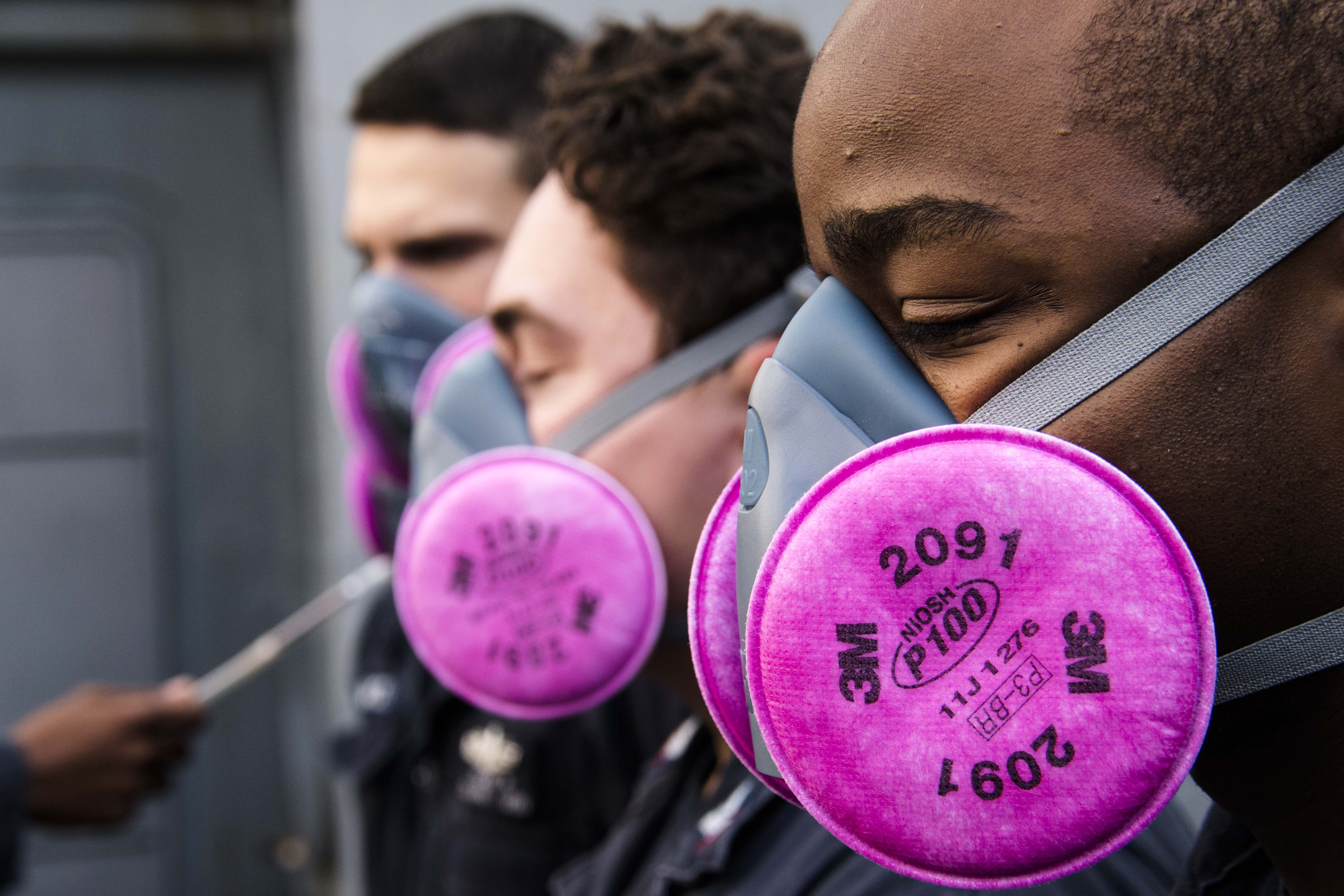
3M 2091 filter with P3-BR approval

European standard EN 143 defines the 'P' classes of particle filters that can be attached to a face mask. These filters are typically used on reusable respirators, like elastomeric respirators.

Standard	Class	Filter type	Filter penetration limit (at 95 L/min air flow)	Inward leakage	Typical elastic band
EN 14683	Type I	Mask	Less than 98% droplet filtration, intended for use by patients	N/A	N/A
EN 14683	Type II	Mask	Not fluid-resistant, 98% droplet filtration, intended for use by healthcare workers in droplet-free environments	N/A	N/A
EN 14683	Type IIR	Mask	Fluid-resistant, 98% droplet filtration, surgical	N/A	N/A
EN 143	P1	Attachment	Filters at least 80% of airborne particles	N/A	N/A
EN 143	P2	Attachment	Filters at least 94% of airborne particles	N/A	N/A
EN 143	P3	Attachment	Filters at least 99.95% of airborne particles	N/A	N/A

Both European standard EN 143 and EN 149 test filter penetration with dry sodium chloride and paraffin oil aerosols after storing the filters at 70 °C (158 °F) and −30 °C (−22 °F) for 24 h each. The standards include testing mechanical strength, breathing resistance and clogging. EN 149 tests the inward leakage between the mask and face, where 10 human subjects perform 5 exercises each. The truncated mean of average leakage from 8 individuals must not exceed the aforementioned values.

=== Other standards (KN95 and others) ===
Chinese standard for respirators

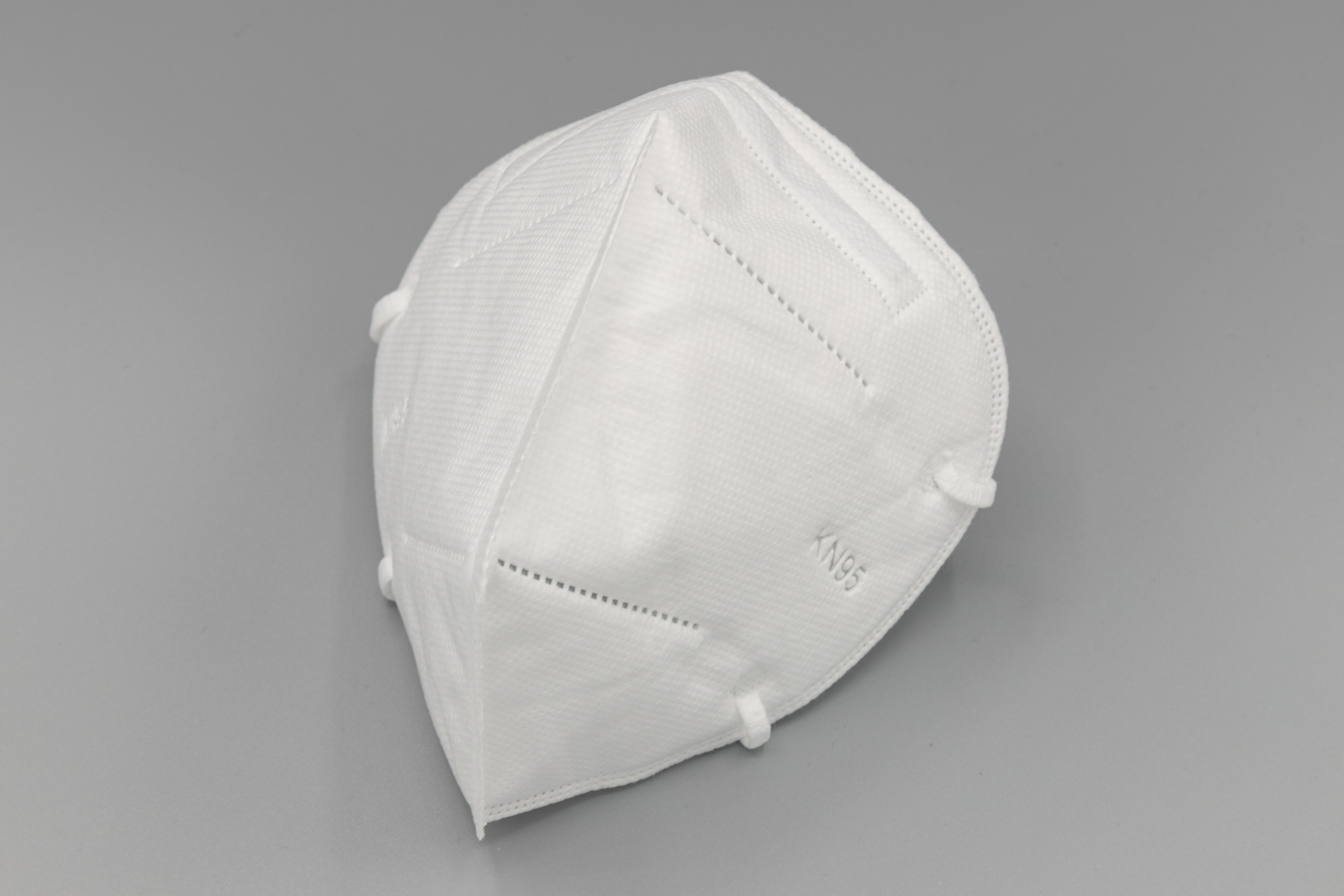
Face mask KN95

Respirator standards around the world loosely fall into the two camps of US- and EU-like grades. According to 3M, respirators made according to the following standards are equivalent to US N95 or European FFP2 respirators "for filtering non-oil-based particles such as those resulting from wildfires, PM 2.5 air pollution, volcanic eruptions, or bioaerosols (e.g. viruses)":

- Chinese KN95 (GB2626-2006): similar to US. Has category KN (non-oily particles) and KP (oily particles), 90/95/100 versions. EU-style leakage requirements. In China, KN95 respirators are made by companies such as Guangzhou Harley, Guangzhou Powecom, Shanghai Dasheng and FLTR.
- Korean 1st Class (KMOEL - 2017–64), also referred to as "KF94": EU grades, KF 80/94/99 for second/first/special. In Korea, KF94 respirators are made by companies such as LG, Soomlab, Airqueen, Kleannara, Dr. Puri, Bluna and BOTN.

The NPPTL has also published a guideline for using non-NIOSH masks instead of the N95 in the COVID-19 response. The OSHA has a similar document. The following respirator standards are considered similar to N95 in the US:

- Japanese DS2/RS2 (JMHLW-Notification 214, 2018): EU-like grades with two-letter prefix – first letter D/R stands for disposable or replaceable; second letter S/L stands for dry (NaCl) or oily (DOP oil) particles. Japanese DS2 respirators are made by companies such as Hogy Medical, Koken, Shigematsu, Toyo Safety, Trusco, Vilene and Yamamoto Safety.
- Mexican N95 (and others) (NOM-116-2009): same grades as in NIOSH.
- Brazilian PFF2 (ABNT/NBR 13698:2011): EU-like grades.

== Disinfection and reuse ==
Hard filtering facepiece respirator masks are generally designed to be disposable, for 8 hours of continuous or intermittent use. One laboratory found that there was a decrease in fit quality after five consecutive donnings. Once they are physically too clogged to breathe through, they must be replaced.

Hard filtering facepiece respirator masks are sometimes reused, especially during pandemics, when there are shortages. Infectious particles could survive on the masks for up to 24 hours after the end of use, according to studies using models of SARS-CoV-2; In the COVID-19 pandemic, the US CDC recommended that if masks run short, each health care worker should be issued with five masks, one to be used per day, such that each mask spends at least five days stored in a paper bag between each use. If there are not enough masks to do this, they recommend sterilizing the masks between uses. Some hospitals have been stockpiling used masks as a precaution. The US CDC issued guidelines on stretching N95 supplies, recommending extended use over re-use. They highlighted the risk of infection from touching the contaminated outer surface of the mask, which even professionals frequently unintentionally do, and recommended washing hands every time before touching the mask. To reduce mask surface contamination, they recommended face shields, and asking patients to wear masks too ("source masking").

Apart from time, other methods of disinfection have been tested. Physical damage to the masks has been observed when microwaving them, microwaving them in a steam bag, letting them sit in moist heat, and hitting them with excessively high doses of ultraviolet germicidal irradiation (UVGI). Chlorine-based methods, such as chlorine bleach, may cause residual smell, offgassing of chlorine when the mask becomes moist, and in one study, physical breakdown of the nosepads, causing increased leakage. Fit and comfort do not seem to be harmed by UVGI, moist heat incubation, and microwave-generated steam.

Some methods may not visibly damage the mask, but they ruin the mask's ability to filter. This has been seen in attempts to sterilize by soaking in soap and water, heating dry to 160 °C (320 °F), and treating with 70% isopropyl alcohol, and hydrogen peroxide gas plasma (made under a vacuum with radio waves). The static electrical charge on the microfibers is destroyed by some cleaning methods. UVGI (ultraviolet light), boiling water vapour, and dry oven heating do not seem to reduce the filter efficiency, and these methods successfully decontaminate masks.

UVGI (an ultraviolet method), ethylene oxide, dry oven heating and vaporized hydrogen peroxide are currently the most-favoured methods in use in hospitals, but none have been properly tested. Where enough masks are available, cycling them and reusing a mask only after letting it sit unused for five days is preferred.

It has been shown that masks can also be sterilized by ionizing radiation. Gamma radiation and high energy electrons penetrate deeply into the material and can be used to sterilize large batches of masks within a short time period. The masks can be sterilized up to two times but have to be recharged after every sterilization as the surface charge is lost upon radiation.

A recent development is a composite fabric that can deactivate both biological and chemical threats.
