= European respirator standards =

European filtering face mask standards

The European respirator standards refer to the filtering classification by EN 149, EN 14683, and EN 143, all European standards of testing and marking requirements for respirators. FFP standard masks (where FFP stands for filtering facepiece) cover the nose, mouth and chin and may have inhalation and/or exhalation valves.

EN 149 defines three classes of such particle half masks, called FFP1, FFP2 and FFP3, according to their filtering efficiency. It also classifies masks into "single shift use only" (not re-usable, marked NR) or "re-usable (more than one shift)" (marked R), while an additional marking letter D indicates that a mask has passed an optional clogging test using dolomite dust. Such mechanical filter respirators protect against the inhalation of particulates such as dust particles, droplets, and aerosols. EN 14683 defines respirators for use in medical settings, while European standard EN 143 defines the 'P' classes of particle filters that can be attached to a face mask, which are P1, P2, and P3. The EN 143 filters are typically used on reusable respirators, like elastomeric respirators.

EN 14387 is the chemical cartridge standard in Europe.

Almost identical tests (but different markings) are used in Australia, New Zealand, Korea and Brazil. Similar standards are used in the United States, China and Japan. For example, EN 149 FFP2 masks have similar performance requirements to N95 masks in the United States and KN95 filters of China, and EN 149 FFP3 masks have similar performance requirements to N99 masks in the United States. However EN 149 test requirements differ somewhat from the U.S./Chinese/Japanese standards: EN 149 requires an additional paraffin oil (paraffinum perliquidum) aerosol test and it tests at a range of different flow rates and defines several associated and permissible pressure drop levels.

== Classification ==
=== EN 149 ===
The EN 149 standard defines performance requirements for three classes of particle-filtering half masks: FFP1, FFP2 and FFP3. The protection provided by an FFP2 (or FFP3) mask includes the protection provided by a mask of the lower-numbered classes.

A mask conforming to the standard must have its class written on it, along with the name of the standard and its year of publication, as well as any applicable option codes, e.g. “EN 149:2001 FFP1 NR D”. Some manufacturers use in addition the colour of the elastic band to identify the mask class, however, the EN 149 standard does not specify any such colour coding and different manufacturers have used different colour schemes.

Class	Filter penetration limit (at 95 L/min air flow)	Inward leakage	Typical elastic band
FFP1	Filters at least 80% of airborne particles	<22%	Yellow
FFP2	Filters at least 94% of airborne particles	<8%	Blue or White
FFP3	Filters at least 99% of airborne particles	<2%	Red

=== EN 14683 and EN 143 ===
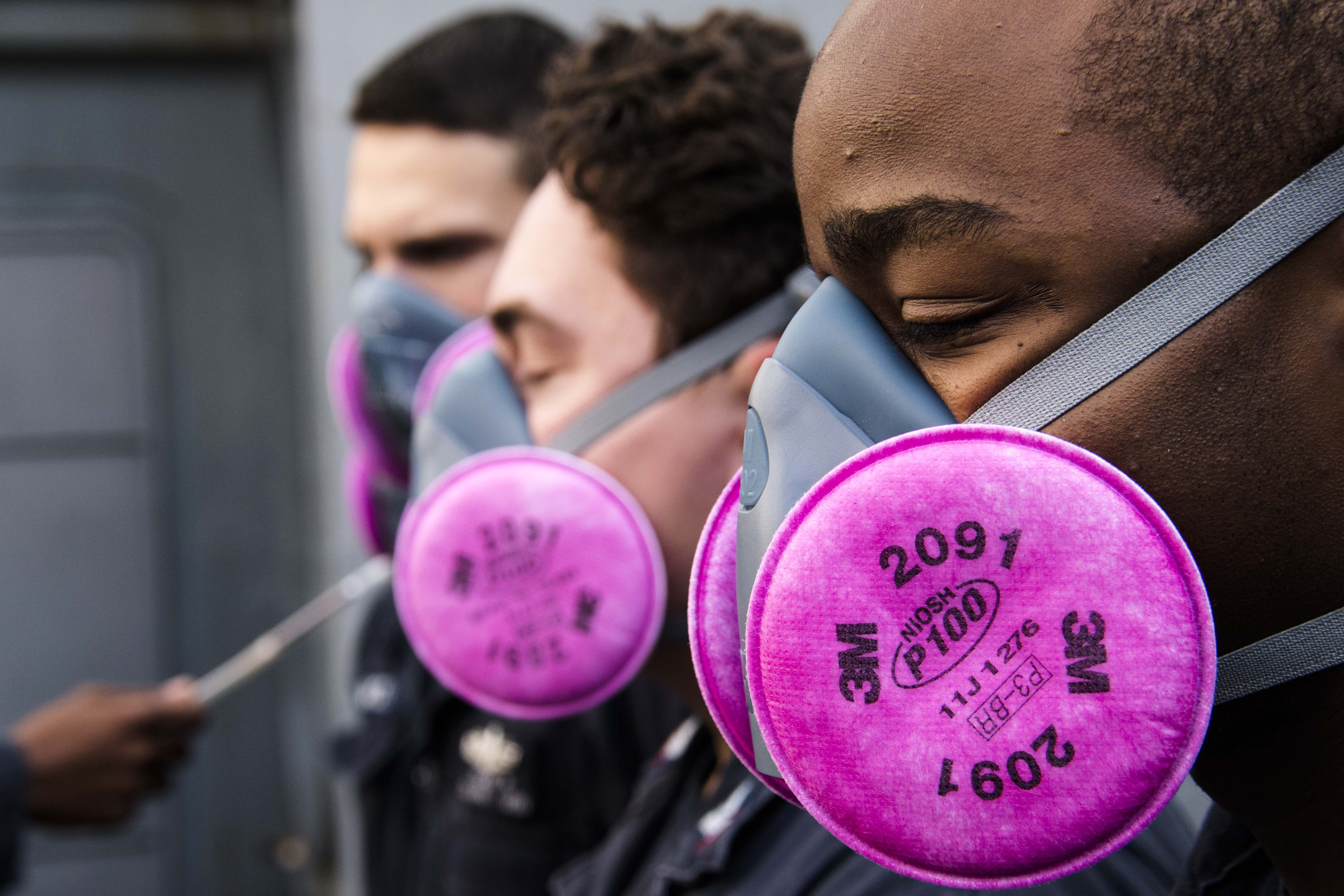
3M 2091 filter with P3-BR approval

European standard EN 143 defines the 'P' classes of particle filters that can be attached to a face mask. These filters are typically used on reusable respirators, like elastomeric respirators.

Standard	Class	Filter type	Filter penetration limit (at 95 L/min air flow)	Inward leakage	Typical elastic band
EN 14683	Type I	Mask	Less than 98% droplet filtration, intended for use by patients	N/A	N/A
EN 14683	Type II	Mask	Not fluid-resistant, 98% droplet filtration, intended for use by healthcare workers in droplet-free environments	N/A	N/A
EN 14683	Type IIR	Mask	Fluid-resistant, 98% droplet filtration, surgical	N/A	N/A
EN 143	P1	Attachment	Filters at least 80% of airborne particles	N/A	N/A
EN 143	P2	Attachment	Filters at least 94% of airborne particles	N/A	N/A
EN 143	P3	Attachment	Filters at least 99.95% of airborne particles	N/A	N/A

Both European standard EN 143 and EN 149 test filter penetration with dry sodium chloride and paraffin oil aerosols after storing the filters at 70 °C (158 °F) and −30 °C (−22 °F) for 24 h each. The standards include testing mechanical strength, breathing resistance and clogging. EN 149 tests the inward leakage between the mask and face, where 10 human subjects perform 5 exercises each. The truncated mean of average leakage from 8 individuals must not exceed the aforementioned values.

=== FFP1 mask ===
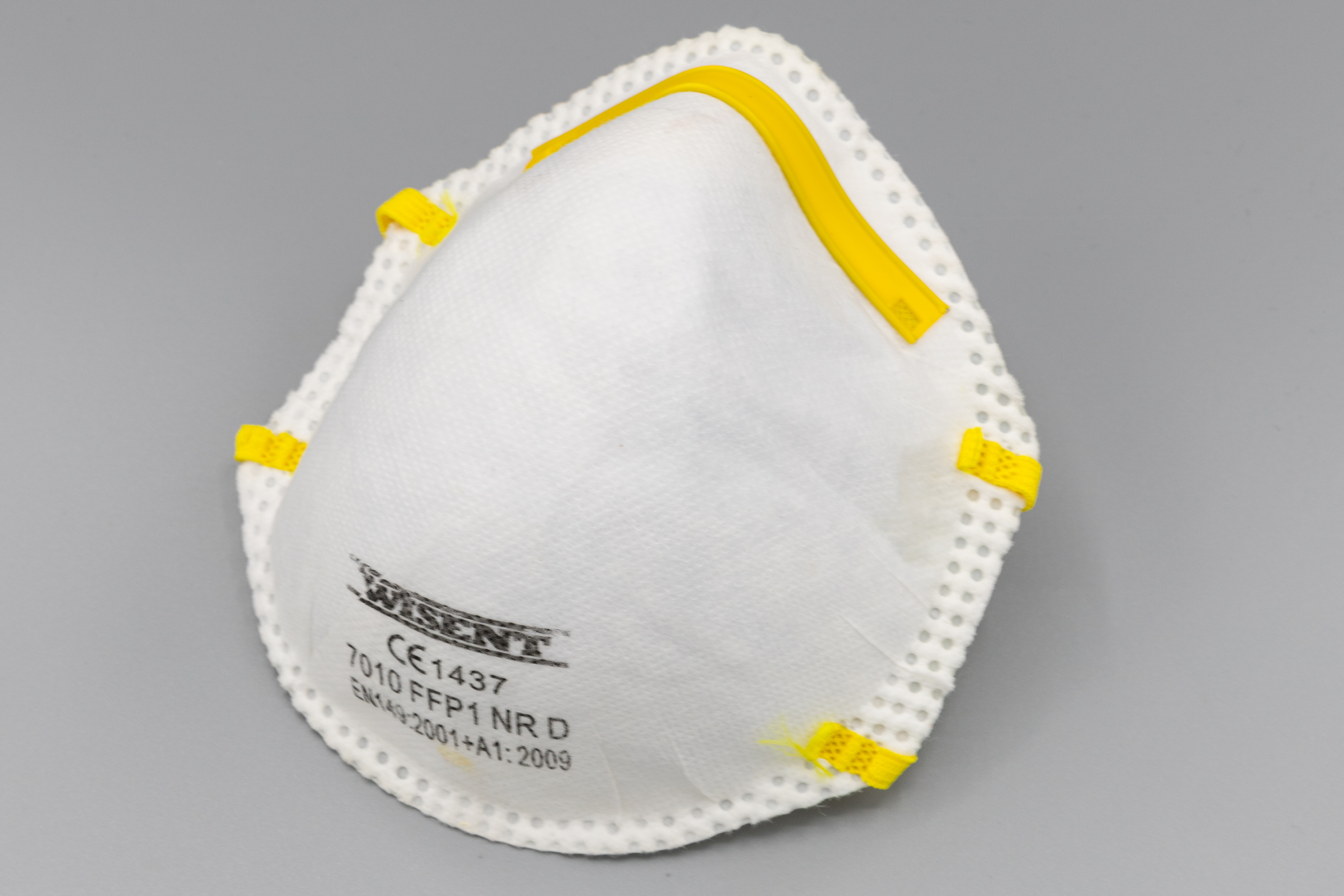
FFP1 face mask

It is the least filtering mask of the three.

- Aerosol filtration percentage: 80% minimum
- Internal leak rate: maximum 22%

It is mainly used as a dust mask (for example for DIY jobs). Dust can cause lung diseases, such as silicosis, anthracosis, siderosis and asbestosis (in particular dust from silica, coal, iron ore, zinc, aluminium or cement are common particulate risks).

=== FFP2 mask ===
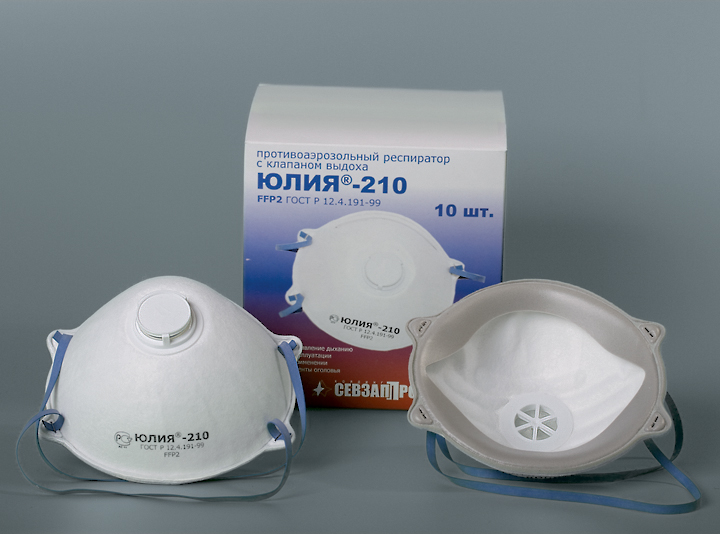
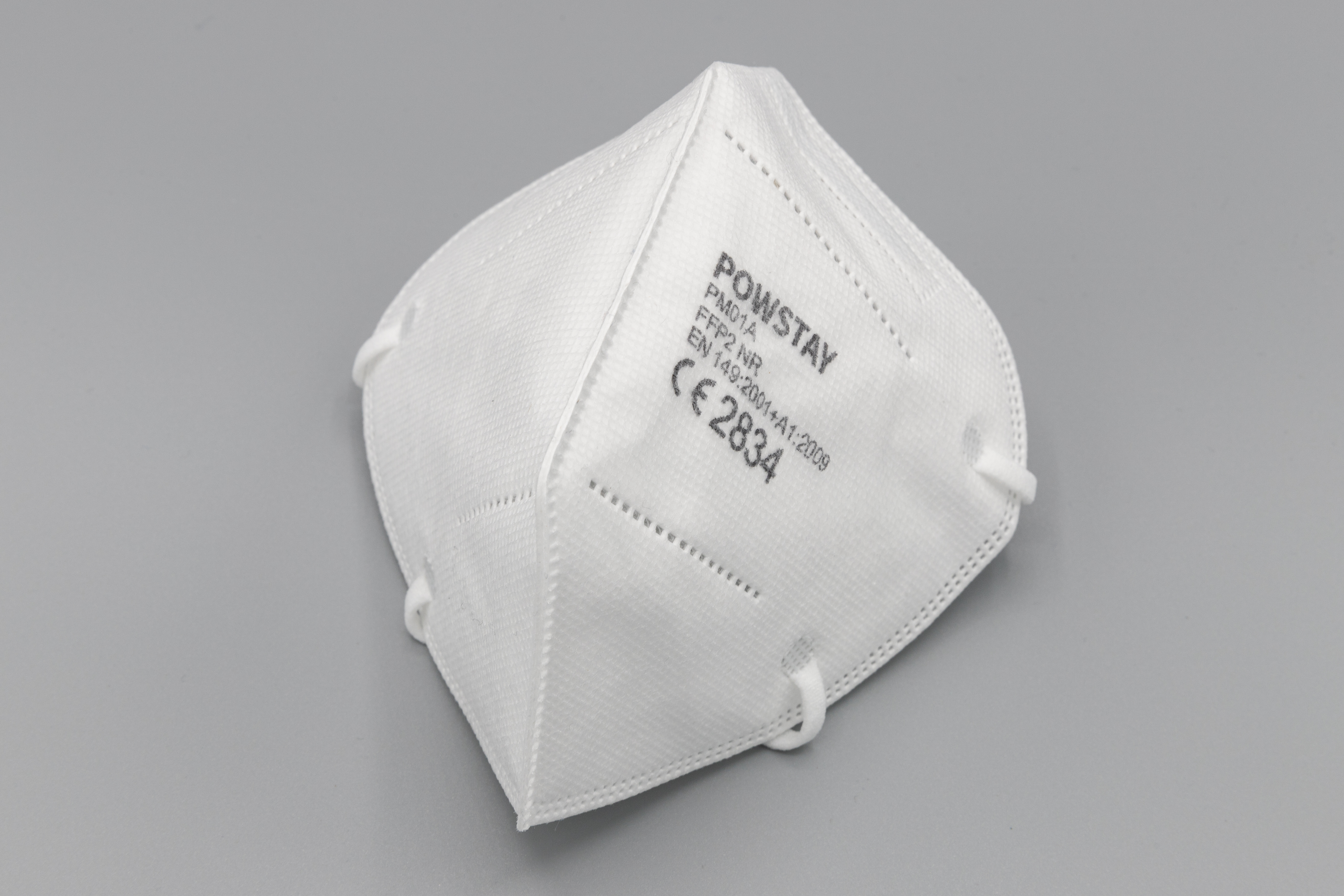
FFP2 face masks with and without exhalation valve
- Aerosol filtration percentage: 94% minimum
- Internal leak rate: maximum 8%

This mask offers protection in various areas such as the glass industry, foundry, construction, pharmaceutical industry and agriculture. It effectively stops powdered chemicals. This mask can also serve as protection against respiratory viruses such as avian influenza or severe acute respiratory syndrome associated with the coronavirus (SARS), as well as against the bacteria of pneumonic plague and tuberculosis. It is similar to the US-standard N95 respirator.

=== FFP3 mask ===
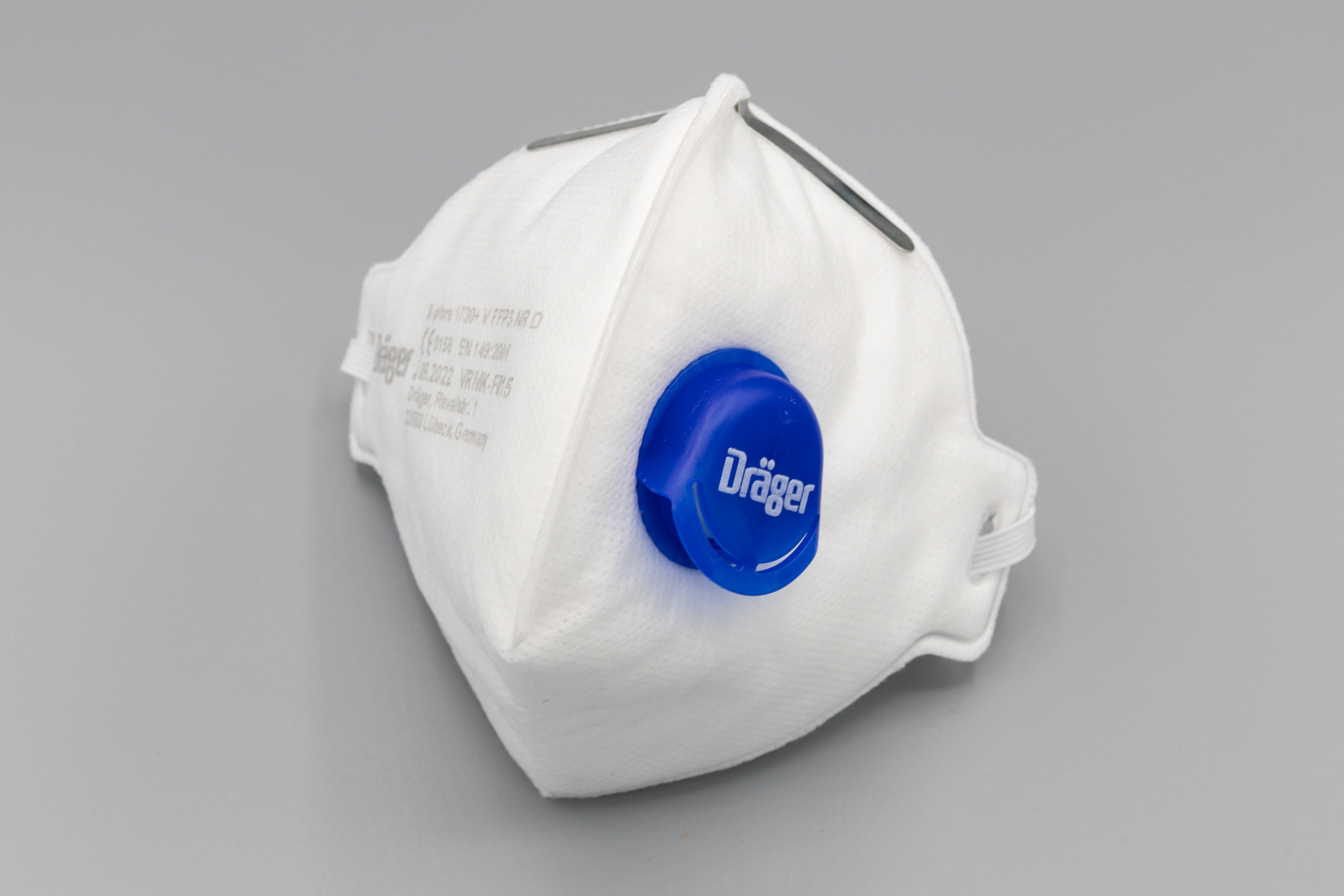
FFP3 face mask

- Aerosol filtration percentage: 99% minimum
- Internal leak rate: maximum 2%

The FFP3 mask is the most filtering of the FFP masks. It protects against very fine particles such as asbestos and ceramic. It does not protect against gases and in particular oxides of nitrogen.

== Requirements ==
EN 149 defines laboratory tests, field tests and certain requirements to ensure the conformity of the masks. The following points are analyzed:

- Packaging
- Materials: resistance to manipulation
- Practical performance test
- Leakage: total leakage inwards and penetration of the filter material

There are some European organizations that issue an examination certificate confirming conformity and specifying the characteristics of the products:

- INRS then APAVE in France
- INSPEC in Great Britain
- Institute for Occupational Safety and Health of the German Social Accident Insurance in Germany
- CIOP-PIB in Poland

=== 2009 version ===
With the publication of the 2009 version of the standard, the designation of the respiratory protection mask is now "particulate filtering half mask". The abbreviation NR or R is added after FFP1, FFP2, FFP3:

1. NR (not reusable): if the use of the filtering half-face mask is limited to one working day. It is not reusable.
2. R (reusable): if the filtering half-face mask can be used for more than one working day, so it is reusable.

Additional suffixes include:

- Anti-clogging NR masks (D). When the half mask has passed the dolomite dust test, a letter D can be added to indicate that the service life may exceed 8 h. Example: FFP3 NR D.
- Valve. The presence of a valve can be indicated by the letter V.
- Particulate type. The letters S or L respectively specify the filtration of solid dust (NaCl-only) or liquid mist (paraffin oil). Example: FFP3 SLV.

Masks manufactured before the new standard was taken into account may still have the old marking.

=== Marking ===
FFP respirators are a type of personal protective equipment (PPE). Here is the notice that should appear on every mask :

- Manufacturer's name
- Mask
- CE number of the certification body (only FFP3) + EN 149: 2009 + the mask class (FFP1, FFP2 or FFP3) + acronym (NR or R) (Note: in case of FFP1 the conformity assessment procedures are done by the manufacturer itself as per Annex IV (Module A)

The marking must comply with European Union Directive 89/686 / EEC on PPE. If any of these entries are missing, the mask will be considered non-compliant.

== Medical use ==
EN 149 tests the ability of masks to protect the wearers against inhaling liquid and dry aerosols. It makes no statement about, and does not specifically test the suitability of such masks for, infection control against airborne transmission of pathogens through respiratory droplets. Nevertheless, FFP2 and FFP3 masks are commonly used for this purpose in medical practice. A researcher at the MRC Biostatistics Unit at Cambridge University claimed in 2021 that switching to FFP3 in Addenbrooke hospital in Cambridge may have cut ward-based Covid infection of staff to zero.

== EN 14387 chemical cartridge classifications ==
EN 14387 is the European chemical cartridge standard. It is similar in scope to ANSI K13.1-1973.

== Similar standards ==
Several regions use standards based on nearly identical tests and thresholds as those in EN 149, but with different markings:

- Russia (GOST R 12.4.191-2011): identical.
- South Korea (KMOEL - 2017–64): considered identical to pre-2009 version. FFP1 is called "2nd grade" or KF80, FFP2 "1st grade" or KF94, and FFP3 "special grade" or KF99.
- Australia and New Zealand (AS/NZ 1716:2012): similar grades with a different test agent, with the exception of FFP3 which has no equivalent. Grades are written simply "P".
- Brazil (ABNT/NBR 13698:2011): identical to pre-2009 version. Grades are written as "PFF".

Other regions use similar tests that (in parts) resemble more closely the 42 CFR 84 requirements in the United States:

- Japan (JMHLW-Notification 214, 2018): similar grades with a different coding scheme for NR/R and S/L types. Written with a two-letter prefix D/R and S/L that maps to NR/R and S/L respectively. Leakage requirement not present.
- Taiwan (CNS 14755): D1/D2/D3 grades for 80/95/99 efficiency. No requirements for inward leakage.

== See also ==
- Gas mask
- NIOSH air filtration rating
- Respirator
- Surgical mask
- Face masks during the COVID-19 pandemic
