= Association of Occupational Health Professionals in Healthcare =

American professional organization

Association of Occupational Health Professionals in Healthcare (AOHP)
- Formation: 1981
- Type: Professional association
- Headquarters: Warrendale, Pennsylvania
- Location: United States
- Members: 1,000
- President: Lydia Crutchfield
- Website: AOHP

The Association of Occupational Health Professionals in Healthcare (AOHP) is a professional association focusing on the health, safety, and well-being of health professionals. It is the only national professional organization in the United States with the exclusive mission of addressing the needs and concerns of occupational health professionals in healthcare settings.

== Activities ==
AOHP's goal is to advance the health, safety and well-being of health professionals. Although the health and safety needs of healthcare personnel are similar to workers at large, they face a unique set of hazards. AOHP's major efforts include the annual EXPO-S.T.O.P. survey of sharps injuries and mucocutaneous blood exposures among healthcare workers in U.S. hospitals. AOHP has taken positions on respiratory protection for healthcare workers. AOHP publishes the Journal of the Association of Occupational Health Professionals in Healthcare.

It has ongoing collaborative relationships with the Occupational Safety and Health Administration, National Institute for Occupational Safety and Health, and The Joint Commission, and organizations such as the Association of periOperative Registered Nurses, the American Association of Occupational Health Nurses, and the Japan Infection Control Association.

== History ==
AOHP began as the local Association of Hospital Employee Health Professionals (AHEHP) in Northern California in 1981. In 1983, it was incorporated and became a national organization as chapters were established elsewhere in the United States. In 1994, it was renamed the Association of Occupational Health Professionals in Healthcare to more accurately reflect its mission and vision.
