= NIOSH air filtration rating =

U.S. rating of respirators

- A 1996 NIOSH publication detailing the changes to respirator regulation after 42 CFR 84. (Read on Wikisource)
- Other name(s): NIOSH ratings
- Regulated by: National Institute for Occupational Safety and Health
- Regulation: 30 CFR 11, 42 CFR 84, ANSI Z88.7-2001
- [edit on Wikidata]

The NIOSH air filtration rating is the U.S. National Institute for Occupational Safety and Health (NIOSH)'s classification of filtering respirators. The ratings describe the ability of the device to protect the wearer from solid and liquid particulates in the air. The certification and approval process for respiratory protective devices is governed by Part 84 of Title 42 of the Code of Federal Regulations (42 CFR 84). Respiratory protective devices so classified include air-purifying respirators (APR) such as filtering facepiece respirators and chemical protective cartridges that have incorporated particulate filter elements.

The NIOSH-provided classifications only cover the filtration of particles or aerosols, not the air-purifying respirator's ability to remove chemical gasses and vapors from air, which is regulated under 42 CFR 84 Subpart L. For chemical cartridge classifications, NIOSH, under 42 CFR 84, partially defers to American National Standard ANSI K13.1-1973. All classifications assume that the respirator is properly fitted.

== NIOSH ratings trademark ==
It is illegal in the United States to use filtration terms coined under 42 CFR 84, or mark masks with the word "NIOSH" without the approval of NIOSH. Information about approved respirators can be found in the NIOSH certified equipment list (CEL).

== Early NIOSH/USBM classifications ==
=== 30 CFR 14 Schedule 21 ===
Prior to the 1970s, respirator standards were under the purview of the US Bureau of Mines (USBM). An example of an early respirator standard, Type A, established in 1926, was intended to protect against mechanically generated dusts produced in mines. These standards were intended to obviate miner deaths, noted to have reached 3,243 by 1907. However, prior to the Hawks Nest Tunnel disaster, these standards were merely advisory, as the USBM had no enforcement power at the time. After the disaster, an explicit approval program was established in 1934, along with the introduction of combination Type A/B/C respirator ratings, corresponding to Dusts/Fumes/Mists respectively, with Type D blocking all three, under 30 CFR 14 Schedule 21.

The Federal Coal Mine Health and Safety Act establishing MESA (later MSHA), the Occupational Safety and Health Act of 1970, establishing NIOSH, as well as other regulations established around the time, reshuffled regulatory authority for respirators, and moved regulations from Part 14 to Part 11 by 1972,^{[N2]} but nonetheless continued the use of USBM-era regulations.

=== 30 CFR 11 ===
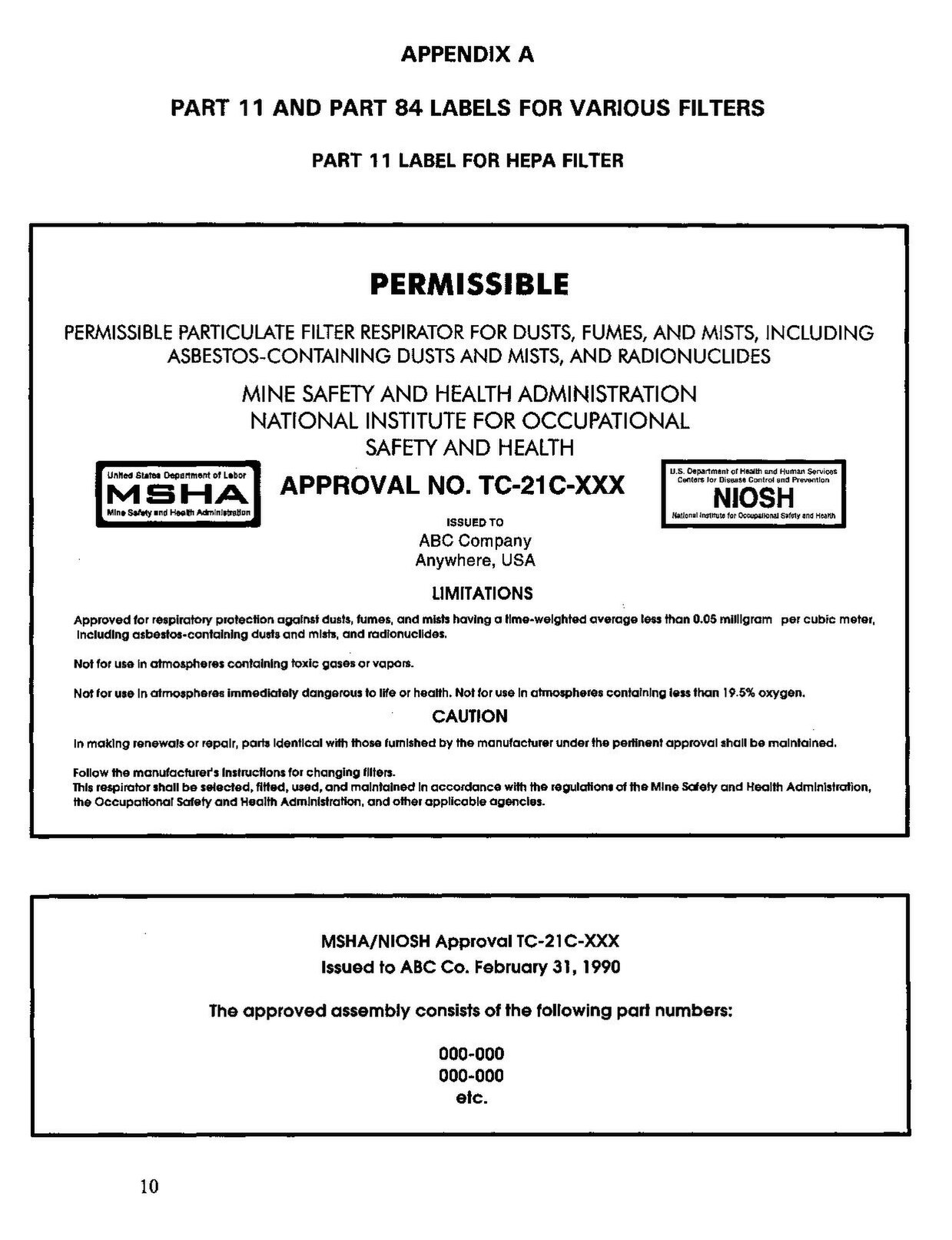
Example Part 11 HEPA Label, TC-21C particulate, with approval for Dusts, Fumes, Mists, radionuclides, and asbestos

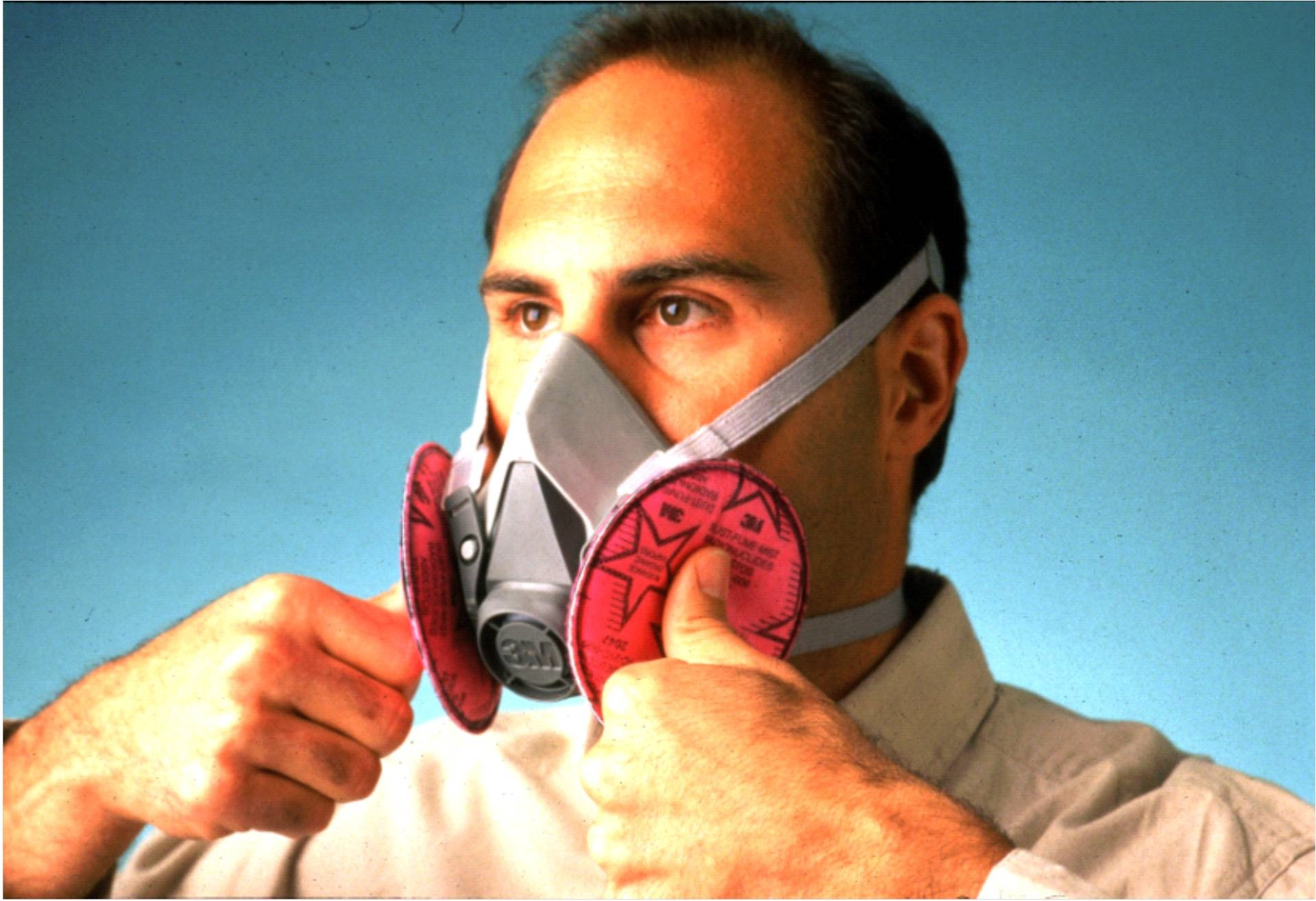
3M 6200 with magenta 'Dust-Fume-Mist Radionuclides Asbestos' (30 CFR HEPA) markings on the filters

Prior to the approval of 42 CFR 84, MSHA and NIOSH approved respirators under 30 CFR 11. Non-powered respirator filters were classified based on their design against a contaminant, including substances like Dusts, Fumes, Mists, radionuclides, and asbestos. Dust/Mist was usually tested with silica, and Fume was usually tested with lead fume. The most popular respirator filters were often referred to as DM (Dust/Mist) or DFM (Dust/Fume/Mist) in CDC and NIOSH literature as shorthand. Non-powered filters were also classified under the HEPA specification, if applicable.

Only 30 CFR 11 HEPA filters were permitted by NIOSH for the prevention of tuberculosis^{[C3]} and asbestos-related diseases.^{[CF1]}

NIOSH was concerned about users choosing inappropriate respirators, like confusion over choosing DM or DFM respirators with regards to particle penetration, so proposed Part 84 rules in 1994 dropped the contaminant/HEPA classification for most respirators in favor of three specifications, Type A, B and C, each representing filtration of 99.97%, 99%, and 95% respectively, with Type A proposed to be used in place of HEPA for non-powered respirators.^{[C1]}

In 1973, the Los Alamos National Laboratory (LANL) recommended NIOSH use NaCl aerosol to test DM and DFM filters. Results from those tests showed significant leakage, with efficiency levels measured at around 75% to 90%. LANL noted that lead fume would plug the tested filters, increasing the apparent filtration efficiency of the filter.

(OBSOLETE) 30 CFR 11 efficiency levels
Particulate	Respirator approval	Maximum dust penetration	Minimum efficiency level	Permitted for TB	Permitted for asbestos
158.4 mg silica 7.92 m^{3} (280 cu ft) air	Single-use Dust/Mist filters	1.8 mg	98.86%	No	No
158.4 mg, usually silica 7.92 m^{3} (280 cu ft) air	Replaceable Dust/Mist filters	1.5 mg	99.05%	No	No
0.3 micron DOP; 0.05 mg per cubic meter air for particles	HEPA (includes Dust/Mist approval)^{[ND3]}	N/A	99.97%	Yes	Yes

== Transition ==
On July 10, 1995, in response to respirators exhibiting "low initial efficiency levels", new 42 CFR 84 standards, including the N95 standard, were enforced under a three-year transition period,^{[C4]} ending on July 10, 1998.^{[N2]} The standard for N95 respirators includes, but is not limited to, a filtration of at least 95% under a 0.3 micrometer^{[C4]} 200 milligram test load of sodium chloride. Standards and specifications are also subject to change.^{[N2]}

Once 42 CFR 84 was in effect, MSHA, under a proposed rule change to 30 CFR 11, 70, and 71, would withdraw from the approval process of rated respirators (outside of respirators used for mining).^{[C1]}

== Current classifications ==
=== 42 CFR 84 ===
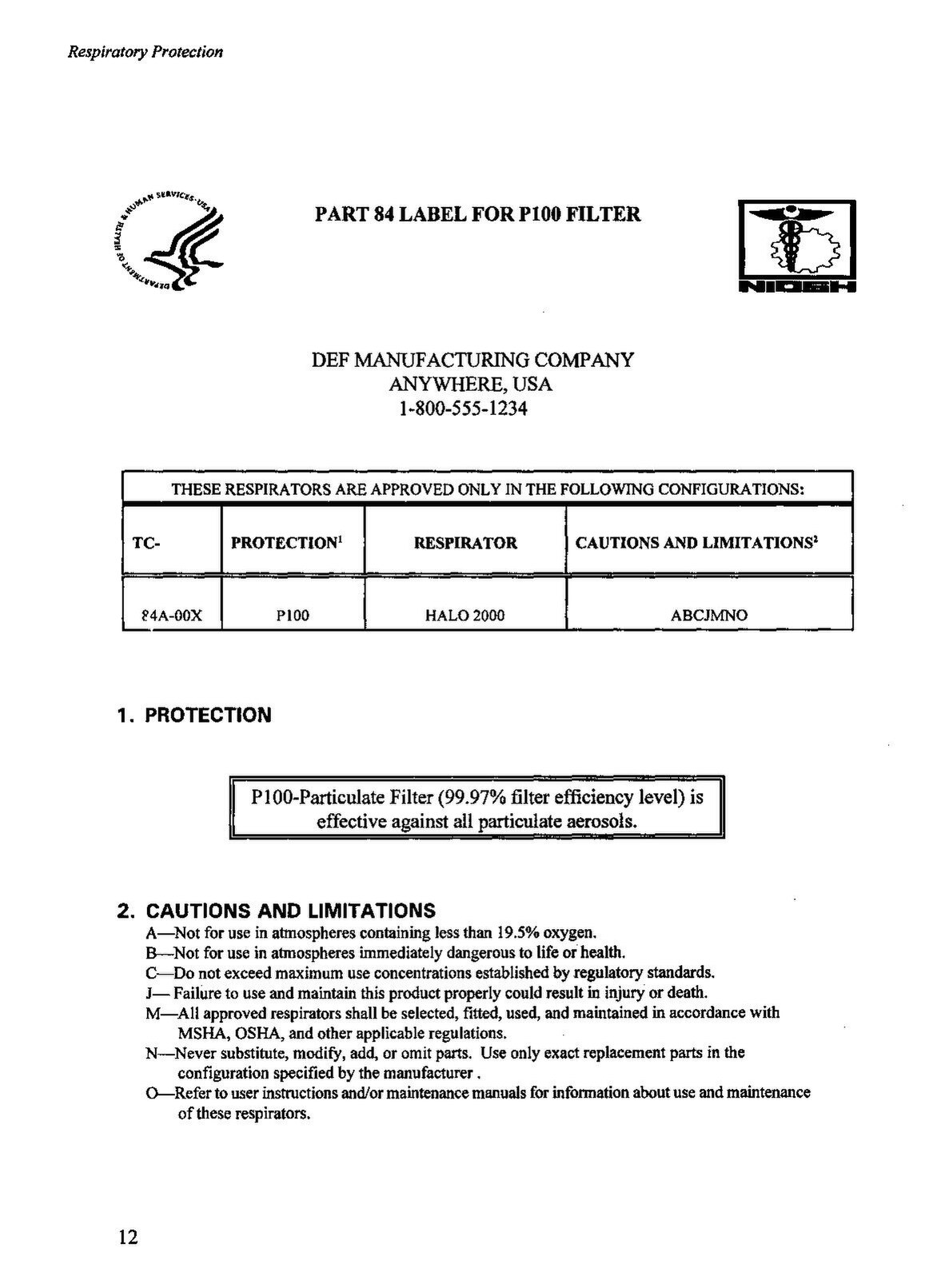
Example Part 84 Label, TC-84A particulate, with older NIOSH logo, for P100 respirator, equivalent to Part 11 HEPA.

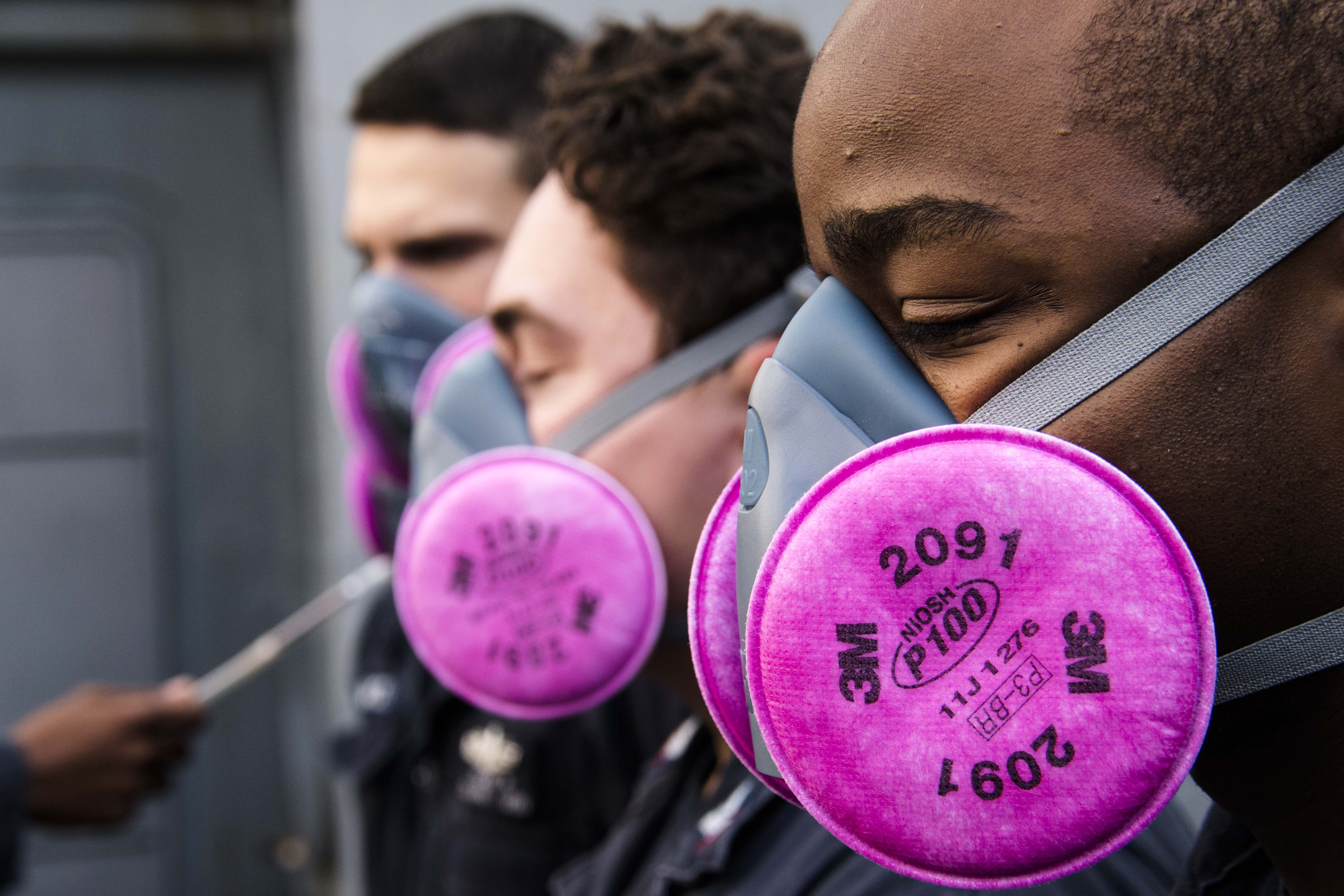
People wearing 3M 2091 magenta P100 filters. Note that these filters do not block vapors.

Under the current revision of Part 84 established in 1995, NIOSH established nine classifications of approved particulate filtering respirators based on a combination of the respirator series and efficiency level. The first part of the filter's classification indicates the series using the letters N, R, or P to indicate the filter's resistance to filtration efficiency degradation when exposed to oil-based or oil-like aerosols (e.g., lubricants, cutting fluids, glycerine, etc.).^{[CF2]}^{[N2]} Definitions and intended use for each series is indicated below.

- N for not resistant to oil. Used when oil particulates are not present. Tested using sodium chloride particles.
- R for resistant to oil. Used when oil particulates are present and the filter is disposed of after one shift. Tested using dioctyl phthalate (DOP) oil particles.
- P for oil-proof. Used when oil particulates are present and the filter is re-used for more than one shift. Tested with DOP oil particles.

The second value indicates the minimum efficiency level of the filter. When tested according to the protocol established by NIOSH each filter classification must demonstrate the minimum efficiency level indicated below.

NIOSH particulate respirator class minimum efficiency levels^{[CF2]}
Particulate	Respirator class	Minimum efficiency level	Permitted for TB	Permitted for asbestos
NaCl (N) or DOP (R,P)	N95, R95, P95	95%	Yes	No
NaCl (N) or DOP (R,P)	N99, R99, P99	99%	Yes	No
NaCl (N) or DOP (R,P)	N100, R100, P100	99.97%	Yes	Yes

All respirator types are permitted for TB.^{[C1]} Class-100 filters can block asbestos.^{[CF1]}^{[S2]} For N type filters, a 200 mg load of NaCl is used, with an undefined service time. For R type filters, a 200 mg of DOP is used, with a defined service time of "one work shift". For P type filters, an indefinite amount of DOP is used until filtration efficiency stabilizes.^{[N2]} P100 filters, under 42 CFR part 84, are the only filters permitted to be magenta in color.

HE (high-efficiency) labeled filters (described in the subsection) are only provided for powered air-purifying respirators. HE-marked filters are 99.97% efficient against 0.3 micron particles and are oil-proof.

Since filters are tested against the by definition most penetrating particle size of 0.3 μm, an APR with a P100 classification would be at least 99.97% efficient at removing particles of this size.^{[N2]} Particles with a size both less than and greater than 0.3 μm may be filtered at an efficiency greater than 99.97%.^{[N2]} However, this may not always be the case, as the most penetrating particle size for N95s was measured to be below 0.1 μm, as opposed to the predicted size of between 0.1 and 0.3 μm.

==== 2020 powered air-purifying respirator update ====
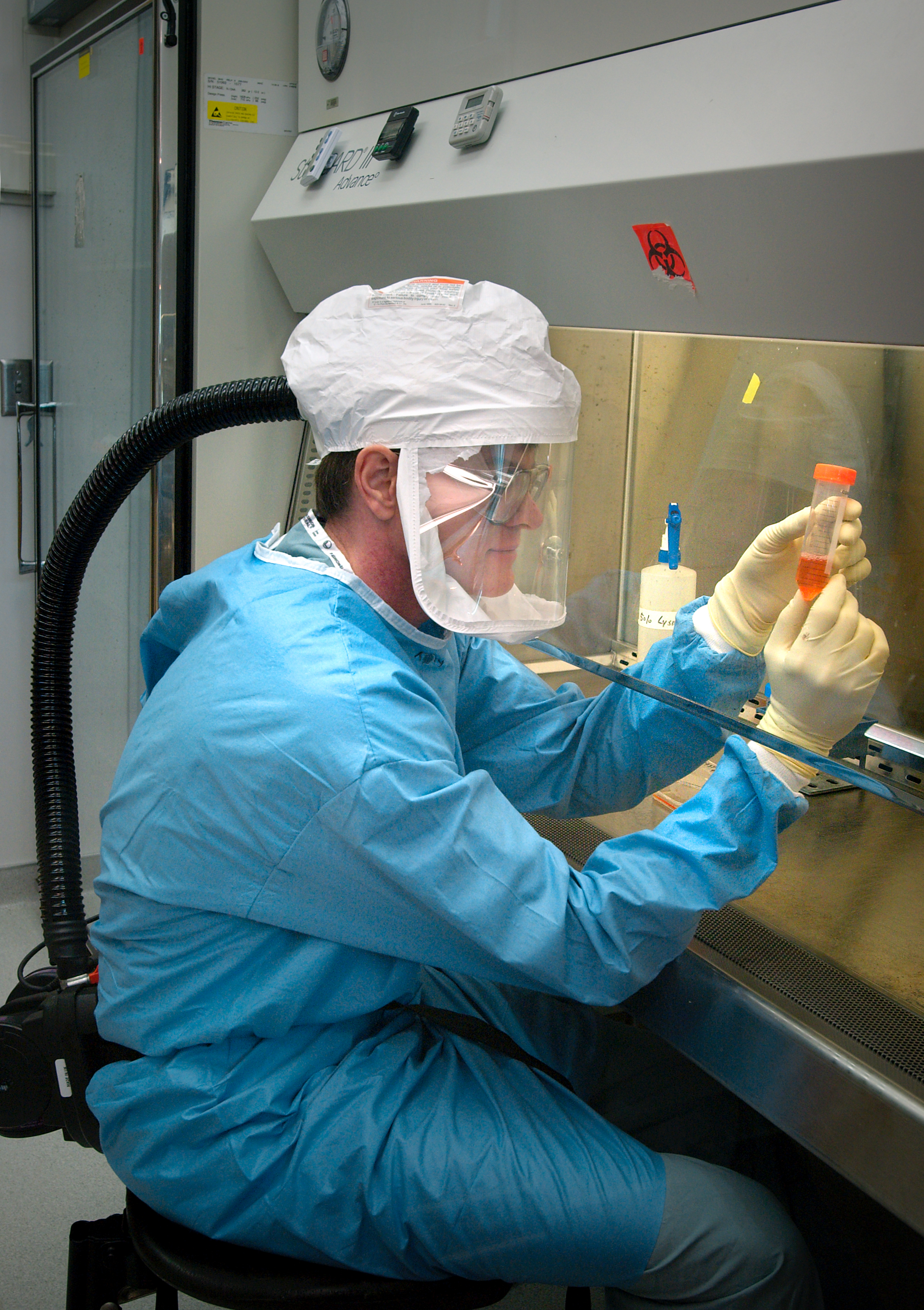
A person wearing a powered air-purifying respirator

42 CFR 84, from 1995 to 2020, copies 30 CFR 11 rules for PAPRs.^{[N2]}

The following table lists the air flow requirements for NIOSH-approved PAPRs under Part 84.175. Tight-fitting PAPRs may be fit tested with the facepiece unpowered and in negative-pressure (under 29 CFR 1910.134) while loose-fitting PAPR fit test protocols have not been changed from 30 CFR 11.^{[CF2]}

Part 84 air flow requirements
Facepiece	Air flow in liters/minute
Tight-fitting	115
Loose-fitting	170

The following table lists the ratings for particulate ratings for Part 84 PAPRs.^{[CF2]} PAPR100 ratings were added in 2020.^{[CF3]}

NIOSH particulate classes for powered air-purifying respirators
Particulate	Respirator class	Minimum efficiency level	Permitted for TB	Permitted for asbestos^{[CF1]}
0.3 micron DOP	HEPA or HE	99.97%	Yes	Yes
0.075 to 1.86 micron NaCl	PAPR100-N	99.97%	Rating discontinued	Not yet defined
0.075 to 1.86 micron DOP	PAPR100-P	99.97%	Rating discontinued	Not yet defined

PAPR100-N is not designed to filter oil particulates, and the official color-coding for all three respirator types is magenta.^{[CF2]}

A study has demonstrated that users carrying out physical work at intensities 80-85% VO2 max "over-breathe" loose-fitting PAPRs and has recommended an increase of air flow to 400 lpm, an approximately two-fold increase over NIOSH-approved values.

=== Chemical cartridge and canister classifications ===
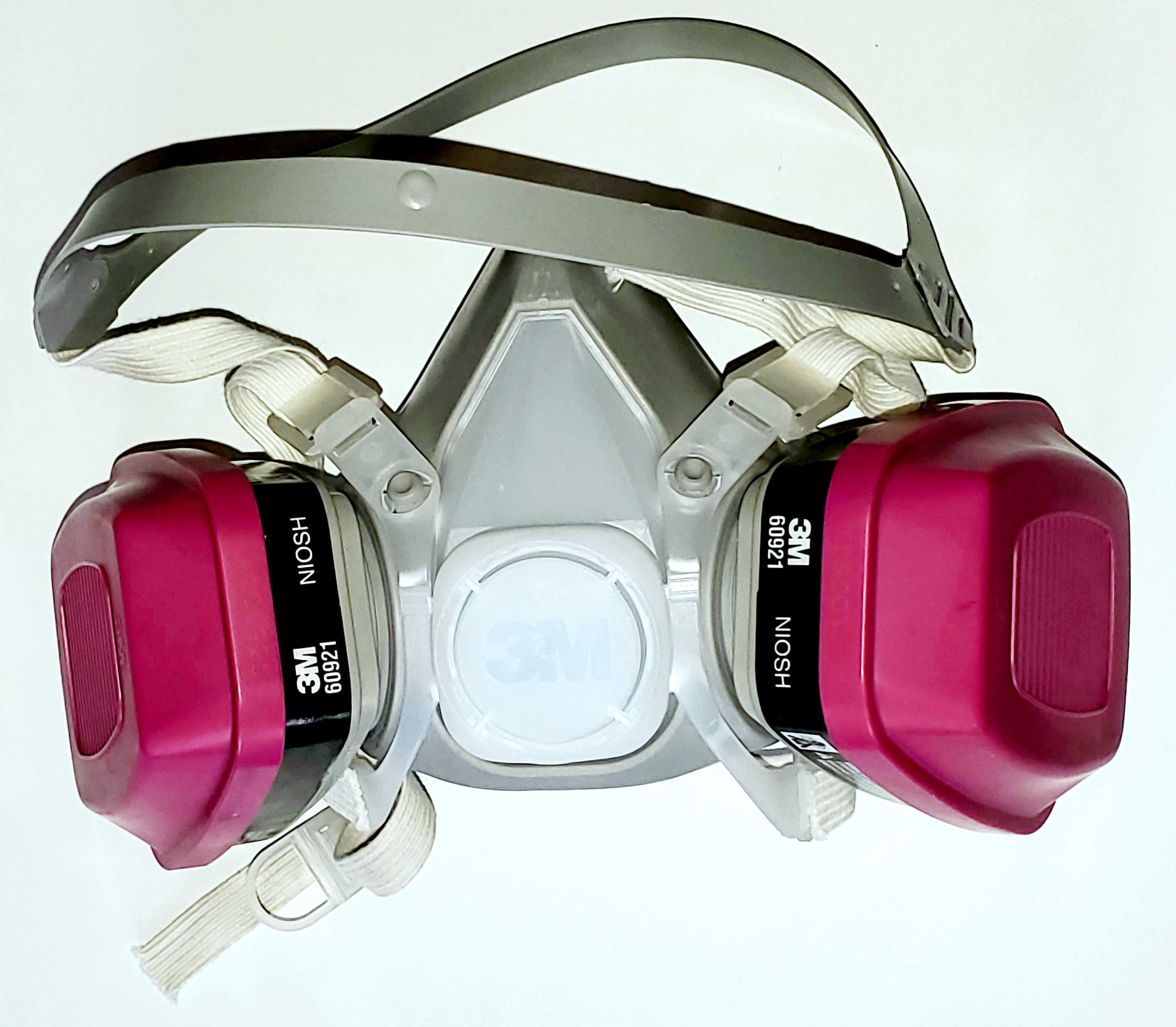
Half-face air-purifying respirator with combination P100 particulate filter (magenta) and organic vapor (black) cartridge

Under 42 CFR 84, chemical cartridges and gas mask canisters are defined separately. Use of the TC-14G canister schedule or the TC-23C chemical cartridge schedule for a given respirator depends on whether "acid gas" is a designated contaminant, which is designated for gas mask canisters only, or if the manufacturer is obligated to list all designated contaminants supported by a given chemical cartridge.^{[ND2]}

42 CFR 84 Subsection L describes seven types of chemical cartridge respirators with maximum use concentrations and penetration, noting that colors and markings are definitively based on ANSI K13.1-1973.^{[CF2]} A TB guide, published by NIOSH in 1999, describes 13 combinations of contaminants with unique color markings. The definitive guide from ANSI, who, since the passage of 42 CFR 84 in 1995, has published a 2001 revision of K13.1-1973, named Z88.7-2001, describes 14 combinations of contaminants with unique color markings, based on 13 out of the 28 NIOSH Protection Designations.^{[S1]}^{[ND1]} The ANSI standard also notes that these classifications do not apply in aviation or military respirators.^{[S1]}

A comparison table below that details the NIOSH protection designations,^{[ND1]} 42 CFR 84,^{[CF2]} the Navy/Marine Field Manual, the NIOSH TB guide, and whether they match up with the (42 CFR 84-declared ANSI K13.1-1973 revision) ANSI Z88.7-2001 colors,^{[S1]} for each type of chemical cartridge is described below. Note that, while the 2001 revision to ANSI K13.1-1973 provides exact colors under the Munsell Color System,^{[S1]} colors and combinations outside the public domain, as well as cartridge/canister designation, have been omitted to facilitate this fair use comparison:

Respirator/Filter type designation and color comparison (Note: See the NIOSH pocket guide for additional respirator use guidelines. Breakthrough concentration times can be calculated through the NIOSH MultiVapor tool, or OSHA math models.)
NIOSH protection designations^{[ND1]}	NIOSH protection abbreviation^{[ND1]}	42 CFR 84 max use concentration^{[CF2]}	Penetration allowed by 42 CFR 84	Efficiency level	1999 NIOSH TB Guide color	Correlated with Z88.7-2001 (K13.1-1973 revision)?^{[S1]}
Acid gas (gas mask only)^{[ND1]}	AG	N/A			White	Yes, for canisters only
Ammonia	AM	300 ppm	50 ppm	83.3%	Green	Yes
Chlorine dioxide	CD	N/A				In standard as combination
Chlorine	CL	10 ppm	5 ppm	50%	White with 1/2" yellow stripe	No stripe, but within designation color
Chloroacetophenone	CN	N/A				
Carbon monoxide	CO	N/A			Blue	Yes
Chlorobenzylidene malononitrile	CS	N/A				
Ethylene oxide	EO	N/A				
Formaldehyde	FM	N/A				
Hydrogen chloride	HC	50 ppm	5 ppm	90%	N/A	In standard as combination
Hydrogen fluoride	HF	N/A				In standard as combination
Hydrogen cyanide	HN	N/A			White, with 1/2" green stripe	No stripe, wrong color, actual color for unlisted combinations
Hydrogen sulfide	HS	N/A				In standard as combination (escape only)
Methylamine	MA	100 ppm	10 ppm	90%	N/A	In standard with ammonia
Mercury vapor	MV	N/A				
Nitrogen dioxide	ND	N/A				
Organic Vapor	OV	1000 ppm or lower	5 ppm	Depends	Black	Yes
Phosphine	PH	N/A				
Sulfur dioxide	SD	50 ppm	5 ppm	90%	N/A	In standard as combination
Vinyl chloride	VC	10 ppm	1 ppm	90%	N/A	NIOSH designation does not exist, may use unlisted combination color
Toluene diisocyanate	TDI	N/A				
Demand (SCBA)	DE	Non-air-purifying respirators (Atmosphere-supplying respirators)				
Pressure Demand (SCBA)	PD	Non-air-purifying respirators (Atmosphere-supplying respirators)				
Supplied-air (Air-line)	SA	Non-air-purifying respirators (Atmosphere-supplying respirators)				
Supplied-air Abrasive Blast	SB	Non-air-purifying respirators (Atmosphere-supplying respirators)				
Self-Contained (SCBA)	SC	Non-air-purifying respirators (Atmosphere-supplying respirators)				
Escape (SCBA)	ESC	Non-air-purifying respirators (Atmosphere-supplying respirators)				

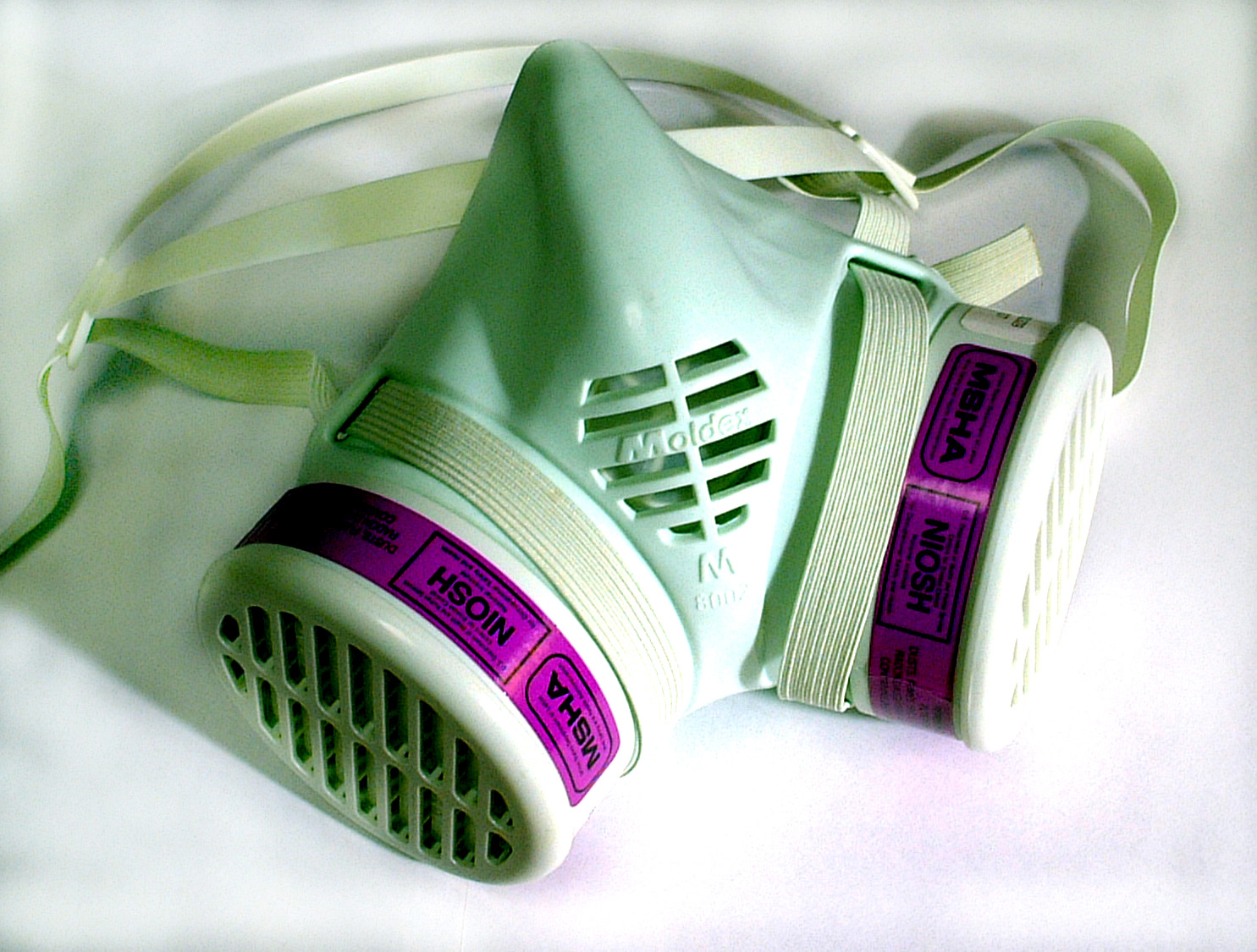
Purple Part 11 HEPA respirator with MSHA/NIOSH emblems

Respirator combination designation and color comparison
	NIOSH protection abbreviation^{[ND1]}	Color	Correlated with Z88.7-2001 (K13.1-1973 revision)?^{[S1]}
1999 NIOSH TB Guide combinations	Any of above chemicals/ Particulates	Gray stripe	Wrong color, no stripe
1999 NIOSH TB Guide combinations	HN/Chloropicrin	Yellow with 1/2" blue stripe	NIOSH designation does not exist, no stripe, wrong color, actual color for unlisted combinations
1999 NIOSH TB Guide combinations	Radionuclides	Purple/Magenta	Yes, under 30 CFR 11 HEPA
1999 NIOSH TB Guide combinations	AG/HN/CL/OV/AM/CO/ Chloropicrin/ radionuclides/ particulate	Red with 1/2" gray stripe	No stripe needed, combination more than required for color (AG/OV/AM/CO)
1999 NIOSH TB Guide combinations	AG/AM	Green with 1/2" white stripe	No stripe, wrong color, actual color for unlisted combinations
1999 NIOSH TB Guide combinations	AG/OV	Yellow	Yes, for canisters only
1999 NIOSH TB Guide combinations	AG/OV/AM	Brown	Yes, for canisters only
Navy/Marine Field Manual combinations (Note: For brevity, only combinations that are different from the TB guide are listed.)	"Acid Gases": CL/CD/HS/HC/SD/HF	White	Combination more than required for color (CL/HC/SD)
Navy/Marine Field Manual combinations	"Organic Vapors": Xylene/Toluene	Brown	Within designation color, but wrong color if exclusive
Navy/Marine Field Manual combinations	"Basic gases": AM/MA	Green	Yes
Navy/Marine Field Manual combinations	FM	Tan	Within designation color, but actual color for unlisted combinations
Navy/Marine Field Manual combinations	MV	Orange	NIOSH designation does not exist, wrong color, actual color for unlisted combinations
Navy/Marine Field Manual combinations	HEPA	Purple	Yes

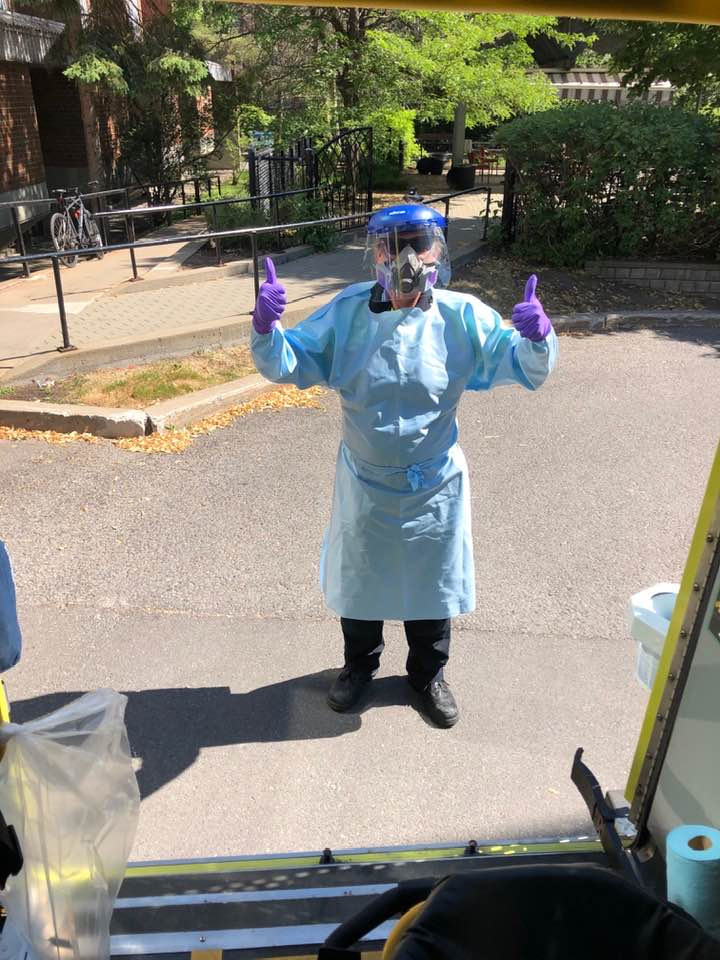
Person wearing purple 3M 7093 P100 cartridge filters

For particulate respirators, while NIOSH designates P100 as filter cartridges that can use the "magenta" color, ANSI designates P100 as "purple", a color which can be seen on some P100 filter cartridges. In addition, the 2001 revision to ANSI K13.1-1973 provides exclusive colors to be used for non-P100 cartridge filters, in two categories: oil-resistant (remaining R- and P- NIOSH ratings), and non-oil resistant (all N-ratings).^{[S1]}

By definition, ANSI Z88.2-2015 considers N100, R100, P100, and HE as HEPA filters.^{[S2]}

== Table of TC/BM approval schedules ==
Screenshot of the NIOSH CEL, dated September 30, 2001, with the six respirator schedules

NIOSH is the current regulator of all the respirators in this schedule, under 42 CFR 84.^{[C1]} 'BM' stands for the US Bureau of Mines, the historical regulator of respirators in the United States.

Approval schedules^{[ND2]}
US Code	Gas mask (Canister^{[ND2]})	Air-line	SCBA	Particulate	PAPR	Chemical Cartridge
BM	BM-14	BM-19	BM-13	BM-21	N/A	BM-23
30 CFR 11	TC-14G	TC-19C	TC-13F	TC-21C	TC-21C	TC-23C
42 CFR 84 (enacted)	TC-14G	TC-19C	TC-13F	TC-84A	TC-21C	TC-23C

TC-21C respirator approval numbers for negative-pressure particulate respirators have three digits, in the form: TC-21C-###, while TC-84A respirator approval numbers have four digits, in the form: TC-84A-####. 42 CFR 84 (until 2020) did not change regulation regarding powered-air purifying particulate respirators, so have continued under TC-21C approval, with four digits, in the form TC-21C-####.^{[N2]}

=== NIOSH Certified Equipment List ===
NPPTL is the designated publisher of the NIOSH Certified Equipment List, or CEL. The CEL is a public domain database that details the respirators currently approved by NIOSH, and is ordered separated based on type of respirator, which is designated with a schedule (e.g. TC-84A). The CEL was initially released in paper form on September 30, 1993. However, due to low usage of the paper CEL, as well as the increasing number of respirators approved by NIOSH, a Microsoft Access-based version of the CEL was released. Initial releases of the CEL had hose and pressure information for air-line respirators. This information had been eliminated due to concerns over users prioritizing the CEL over respirator documentation.

== NIOSH rating limitations ==
NIOSH air filtration ratings do not test the fit of a respirator. Fit testing is required by OSHA for employers when a hazard is present, and voluntary respirator use under Appendix D is not allowed due to the hazard.^{[C5]} Rules for fit testing are also defined by ANSI Z88.2. Z88.2 notes that, in Canada, respirator care and fit testing are defined by CSA Z94.4.^{[S2]}^{[S3]}

== Similar standards ==
Classic collection efficiency curve with filter collection mechanisms

A few other jurisdictions use standards similar to the NIOSH scheme to classify mechanical filter respirators. They include:

- China (GB 2626-2019): Similar testing requirements and grades. Has "KN" and "KP" resistance levels, 90/95/99. Has additional EU-like rules on leakage.
- Mexico (NOM-116-2009): Same grades.
- South Korea (KMOEL - 2017-64): EU grades, KF 80/94/99 for second/first/special

== See also ==
- Aerosol
- Division of Industrial Hygiene
- N95 respirator
- NIOSH
- European respirator standards
