= Chemical cartridge =

Container that cleans pollution from air inhaled through it

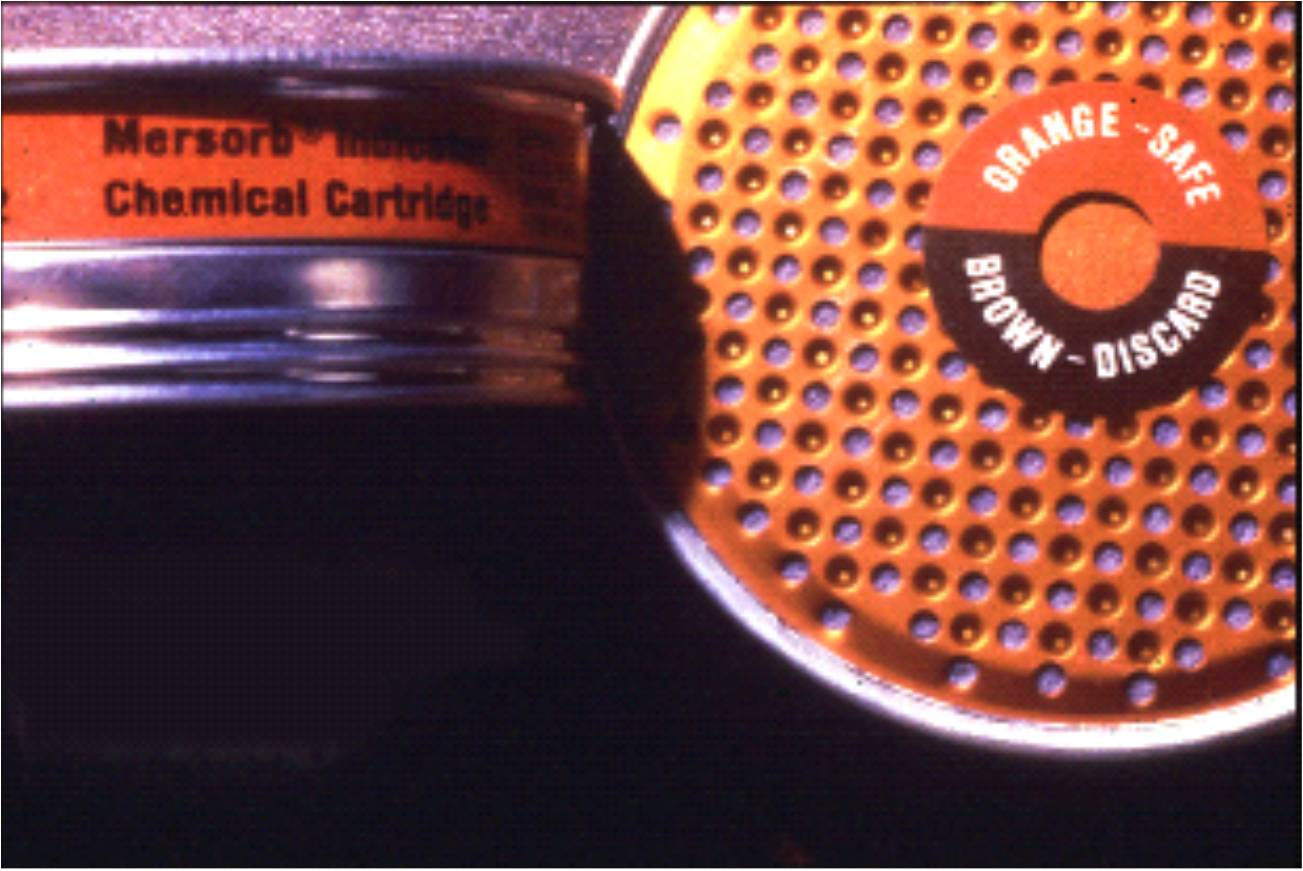
- Other name(s): chemical canister, cartridges and canisters of air-purifying respirators
- Regulated by: American National Standards Institute, National Institute for Occupational Safety and Health
- Regulation: 42 CFR 84, ANSI Z88.7-2001, EN 14387
- NIOSH schedule: TC-23C (not including canisters)
- [edit on Wikidata]

A respirator cartridge or gas mask canister is a type of filter that removes gases, volatile organic compounds (VOCs), and other vapors from the air through adsorption, absorption, or chemisorption. It is one of two basic types of filters used by air-purifying respirators. The other is a mechanical filter, which removes only particulates. Hybrid filters combine the two.

Workplace air that is polluted with fine particulate matter or noxious gases, but contains enough oxygen (in the US, this is ruled to be a concentration above 19.5%; in the Russian Federation, above 18%), can be rendered safe via air-purifying respirators. Cartridges are of different types, and must be chosen correctly and replaced on an appropriate schedule.

== Purification methods ==
=== Absorption ===
Capturing noxious gases may be accomplished by sorbents. These materials (activated carbon, aluminium oxide, zeolite, etc.) have a large specific surface area and can absorb many gases. Typically, such sorbents are in the form of granules and fill the cartridge. Contaminated air travels through the cartridge's bed of sorbent granules. Movable harmful gas molecules collide with the surface of the sorbent and remain therein. Gradually, the sorbent saturates and loses its ability to capture pollutants. The bond strength between captured molecules and the sorbent is small, and molecules can separate from the sorbent and return to the air. The sorbent's ability to capture gases depends on the properties of the gases and their concentrations, including air temperature and relative humidity.

=== Chemisorption ===
Chemisorption utilizes a chemical reaction between the gas and the absorber. The ability of some harmful gases to react chemically with other substances can be used to capture them. Creating strong links between gas molecules and a sorbent may allow repeated use of a canister if it has enough unsaturated sorbent. Copper salts, for example, can form complex compounds with ammonia. A mixture of copper ions, zinc carbonate, and TEDA can detoxify hydrogen cyanide. By saturating activated carbon with chemicals, chemisorption can be used to help the material make stronger ties with molecules of trapped gases and improve the capture of harmful gases. Saturation of iodine improves mercury capture, saturation of metal salts improves ammonia capture, and saturation of metal oxides improves acid gas capture.

=== Catalytic decomposition ===
Some harmful gases can be neutralized through catalytic oxidation. A hopcalite can oxidize toxic carbon monoxide (CO) into harmless carbon dioxide (CO_{2}). The effectiveness of this catalyst strongly decreases as relative humidity increases. Therefore, desiccants are often added. Air always contains water vapor, and after saturation of the desiccant, the catalyst ceases to function.

=== Combined cartridges and canisters ===
Combined, or multi-gas canisters and cartridges, protect from harmful gases by using multiple sorbents or catalysts. An example is the ASZM-TEDA Carbon canister used in CBRN masks by the US Army. This is a form of activated carbon saturated with copper, zinc, silver, and molybdenum compounds, as well as with triethylenediamine (TEDA).

== Classification and marking ==
Cartridge selection comes after assessing the atmosphere. NIOSH guides cartridge (and canister) choice in the US along with manufacturer recommendations.

=== United States ===
Under 42 CFR 84, chemical cartridges and gas mask canisters are defined separately. Use of the TC-14G canister schedule or the TC-23C chemical cartridge schedule for a given respirator depends on whether "acid gas" is a designated contaminant, which is designated for gas mask canisters only, or if the manufacturer is obligated to list all designated contaminants supported by a given chemical cartridge.^{[ND2]}

42 CFR 84 Subsection L describes seven types of chemical cartridge respirators with maximum use concentrations and penetration, noting that colors and markings are definitively based on ANSI K13.1-1973.^{[CF2]} A TB guide, published by NIOSH in 1999, describes 13 combinations of contaminants with unique color markings. The definitive guide from ANSI, who, since the passage of 42 CFR 84 in 1995, has published a 2001 revision of K13.1-1973, named Z88.7-2001, describes 14 combinations of contaminants with unique color markings, based on 13 out of the 28 NIOSH Protection Designations.^{[S1]}^{[ND1]} The ANSI standard also notes that these classifications do not apply in aviation or military respirators.^{[S1]}

=== European Union and Russia ===
In the European Union (EU) and the Russian Federation (RF), manufacturers can certify cartridges intended for cleaning the air of various gaseous contaminants. The codes are covered by EN 14387, additionally, particulate codes P1, P2, and P3 are used. For example, A1P2 is the code for commonly used filters in industry and agriculture that provide protection against A-type gases, commonly occurring particulates, and other organic particulates.

Cartridges types in EU and RF
Harmful substances	Marking	Color	Low sorbent capacity	Medium sorbent capacity	Large sorbent capacity
Organic gases and vapors with boiling point above 65 °C recommended by the manufacturer	А	Brown	A1	A2	A3
Inorganic gases and vapors, with the exception of carbon monoxide, recommended by the manufacturer	В	Grey	В1	В2	В3
Sulphur dioxide and other acid gases and vapors recommended by the manufacturer	E	Yellow	Е1	Е2	Е3
Ammonia and its organic derivatives recommended by the manufacturer	K	Green	К1	К2	К3
Organic compounds with low boiling temperature (<65°С) recommended by the manufacturer	AX	Green	AX		
Particular gases specified by the manufacturer	SX	Violet	SX		
Nitric oxide NO (NO_{2})	NO	Blue and white	NO		

Cartridges AX, SX, and NO do not distinguish on the sorption capacity (as in the US) when they are classified and certified.

If the cartridge is designed to protect from several different types of harmful gases, the label will list all designations in order. For example: A2B1, color - brown and grey.

Other jurisdictions that use this style of classification include Australia/New Zealand (AS/NZS 1716:2012) and China (GB 2890:2009).

== Detection of end of service life ==
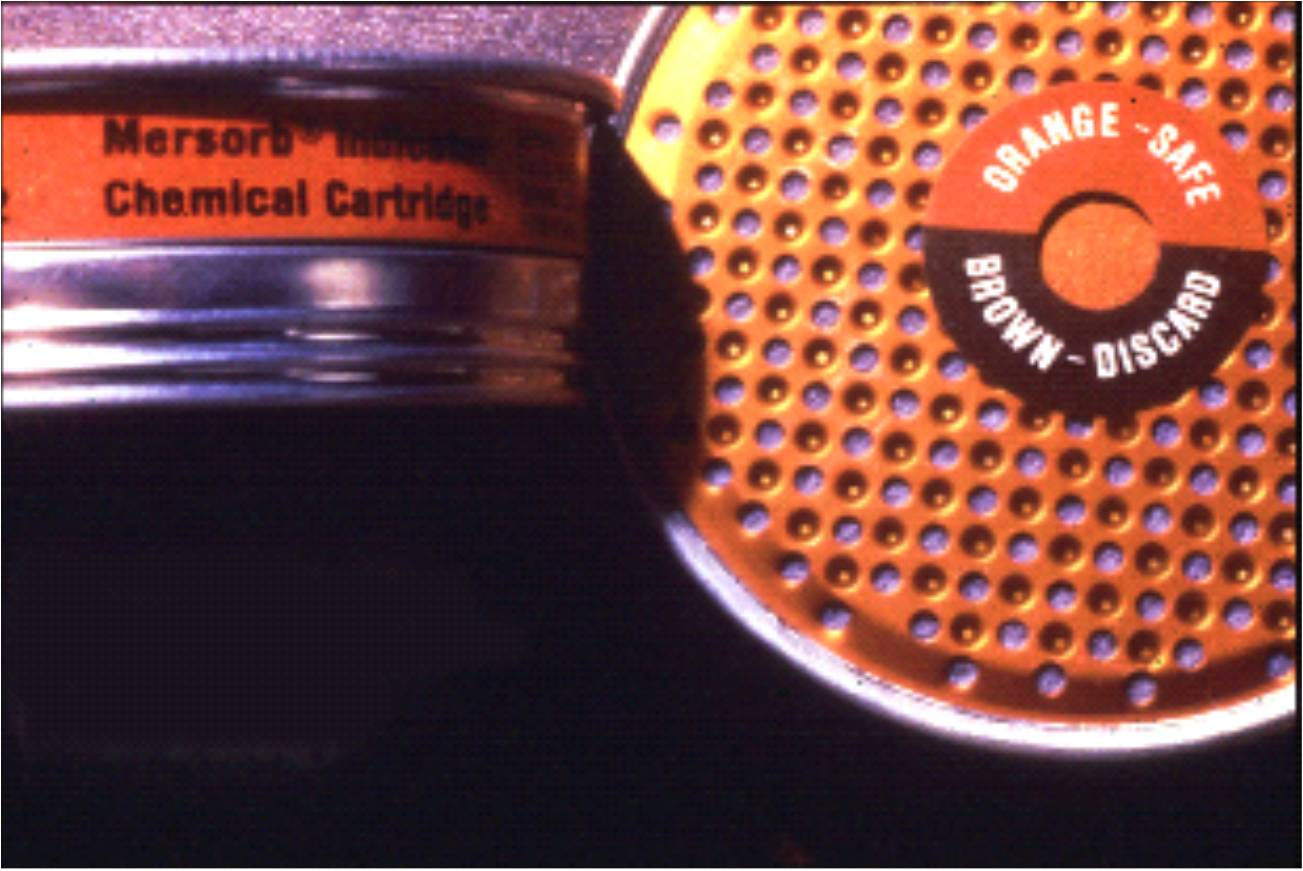
End-of-service-life indicator (ESLI). Saturation of sorbent mercury vapor leads to a color change (circle visible at the center of cartridge surface) from orange to brown.

The service lives of all types of cartridges are limited, therefore, the employer is obliged to replace them in a timely manner.

=== Old methods ===
==== Subjective reactions of users' sensory systems ====
The use of cartridges in the contaminated atmosphere leads to saturation of the sorbent (or the dryer, when using catalysts). Once fully saturated, concentration of harmful gases in the purified air gradually increases. The presence of harmful gases in the inhaled air can lead to a reaction in a user's sensory system: odor, taste, irritation of the respiratory system, dizziness, headaches, and other health impairments up to loss of consciousness and death.

These signs (known in the US as "warning properties" - p. 28) indicate that one must leave the polluted workplace area, and replace the cartridge with a new one. This can also be a symptom of a loose fit of the mask to one's face, and the leakage of unfiltered air through the gaps between the mask and the face. Historically, this method is the oldest.

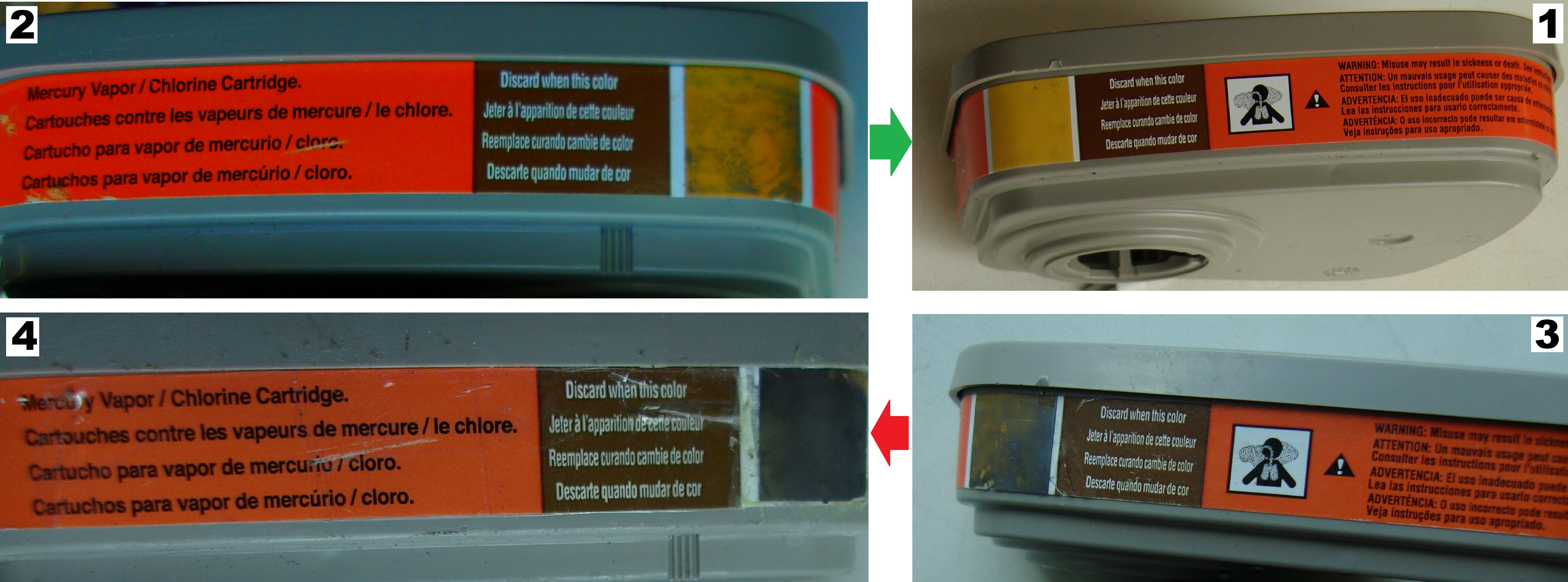
Respirator cartridge (3M 6009) for protection against mercury vapor and chlorine. This cartridge has an indicator that progressively changes color (from yellow to black, 1-2-3-4) when it is exposed to mercury vapor.

The advantages of this method – if harmful gases have warning properties at concentrations less than 1 PEL, the replacement will be produced on time (in most cases, at least); the application of this method does not require the use of special cartridges (more expensive) and accessories; replacement happens when one needs to do it – after the sorbent saturation, and without any calculations; the sorption capacity of the cartridges is fully expired (which reduces costs for respiratory protection).

The disadvantage of this method is that some harmful gases have no warning properties. For example, there is a list of over 500 harmful gases in the Respirator Selection Guide. Over 60 of them have no warning properties, and there is no such information for over 100 of them. This can lead to breathing air with an excess harmful gas concentration in some cases, if one uses warning properties to replace cartridges.

Comparison of odor thresholds and Occupational exposure limits (short term) for several substances
Gases and vapors (CAS)	Short term PEL, mg/m^{3}	Odor thresholds, mg/m^{3}	
Gases and vapors (CAS)	Short term PEL, mg/m^{3}	3M Russia	Maximum and minimum
Heptane (142–82–5)	900	40.7	3000 - 1.7
Methyl acetate (79–20–9)	100	19	8628 - 0.5
Dichloromethane (75–09–2)	100	3.41	1530 - 4.1
Tetrahydrofuran (109–99–9)	100	11.39	180 - 0.27
Cyclohexane (110–82–7)	80	293	2700 - 1.8
Trichloroethene (79–01–6)	30	7.43	900 - 2.5
Tetrachlorethylene (127–18–4)	30	42.53	480 - 8.1
2-Ethoxyethanol (110–80–5)	30	4.57	180 - 1.1
Carbon tetrachloride (56–23–5)	20	260.3	3700 - 10.6
Chloroform (67–66–3)	10	61	6900 - 0.5
Benzene (71–43–2)	15	29.7	1000 - 2.5
1,1,2,2-Tetrachloroethane (79–34–5)	5	1.46	50 - 1.6
Allyl alcohol (107–18–6)	2	1.16	83 - 1.2
Epichlorohydrin (106–89–8)	2	3.59	46 - 0.3
Hydrocyanic acid (74–90–8)	0.3	0.72	6 - 0.01
Phosphine (7803–51–2)	0.1	0.198	7 - 0.014
Chlorine (7782–50–5)	1	no information	14,3 - 0,06

According to the ICHS, all listed substances in the table cannot be reliably detected by smell at dangerous concentrations. On the other hand, all publications with information only about average odor perception thresholds can partly misinform the reader, since they create the impression that the thresholds are stable and constant.

If the threshold odor of Benzene is 20 PEL; and if its concentration is only 10 PEL, one cannot timely change cartridges by using smell - they could be "used" forever, but they cannot protect forever.

The practice has shown that the presence of warning properties does not always lead to timely cartridge replacement. A 1983 study showed that on average 95% of a group of people have an individual threshold of olfactory sensitivity in the range of from 1/16 to 16 from the mean. This means that 2.5% of people will not be able to smell harmful gases at a concentration 16 times greater than the average threshold of perception of a smell. The threshold of sensitivity of different people can vary by two orders of magnitude. That is, 15% of people do not smell at concentrations four times higher than the sensitivity threshold. The value of threshold smell greatly depends on how much attention people pay to it, and on their health status.

The sensitivity may be reduced, for example, due to colds and other ailments. It turns out that a worker's ability to detect smell also depends on the nature of the work to be performed — if it requires concentration, a user may not react to the smell. Prolonged exposure to harmful gases (for example, hydrogen sulfide) at low concentrations can create olfactory fatigue which reduces sensitivity. In a group of workers, the average styrene odor threshold increased by an order of magnitude due to adaptation. However, the perception of odors of other substances did not change. And the workers could mistakenly believe that their olfactory organ remained sensitive to styrene too.

This was the reason for the ban of this method of cartridge replacement in the US since 1996 .

==== Mass increase ====
Filters to protect workers from carbon monoxide cartridges often use the catalyst hopcalite. This catalyst does not change its properties over time when it is being used, but when it moistens, the degree of protection may be significantly reduced. Because water vapor is always present in the air, the polluted air is dehumidified in the cartridge (for use of the catalyst). Since the mass of water vapor in the polluted air is greater than the mass of harmful gases, trapping moisture from the air leads to a significantly higher increase in the mass of cartridges than the trapping gases. This is a substantial difference, and it can be used to determine whether to continue to use gas cartridges further without replacement. The cartridge is weighed, and a decision can be made based on the magnitude of increase of its mass.

==== Other methods ====
Certain documents described Soviet cartridges (model "Г"), as being designed to protect from mercury. Their service life was limited to 100 hours of use (cartridges without particle filter), or 60 hours of use (cartridges with particle filter), after which it was necessary to replace the cartridge with a new one.

The documents describe a non-destructive way to determine the remaining service life of new and used gas cartridges. Polluted air was pumped through the cartridge. The degree of purification of air depends on how much-unsaturated sorbent is in the cartridge, therefore, accurate measurement of gas concentration in the cleaned air allows one to estimate the amount of the unsaturated sorbent. Polluted air (1-bromobutane) was pumped for a very short time, and therefore, such tests do not reduce the service life considerably. The sorption capacity decreased due to absorption of this gas by about 0.5% of the sorption capacity of a new cartridge. The method was also used for 100% quality control of the cartridges manufactured by the English firm Martindale Protection Co. (10 microliters 1-bromobutane injected into the air stream), and to check the cartridges issued to workers in firms Waring, Ltd. and Rentokil, Ltd. This method was used in the Chemical Defence Establishment in the early 1970s. The experts who developed this method received a patent.

The document briefly describes two methods to objectively evaluate the degree of saturation of the sorbent in the cartridges. It recommends using spectral and microchemical methods. The spectral method is based on determining the presence of harmful substances in the cartridge by sampling, with subsequent analysis on a special device (стилоскоп - on Russian). A microchemical method is based on a layer-by-layer determination of the presence of harmful substances in the sorbent by sampling with subsequent analysis by chemical method. If the air is contaminated with the most toxic substances, the book recommends to limit the further duration of cartridge use, and it recommended to apply the spectral method (arsine and phosphine, phosgene, fluorine, organochloride, organometallic compounds), and microchemical methods (hydrogen cyanide, cyanogens).

=== Modern methods ===
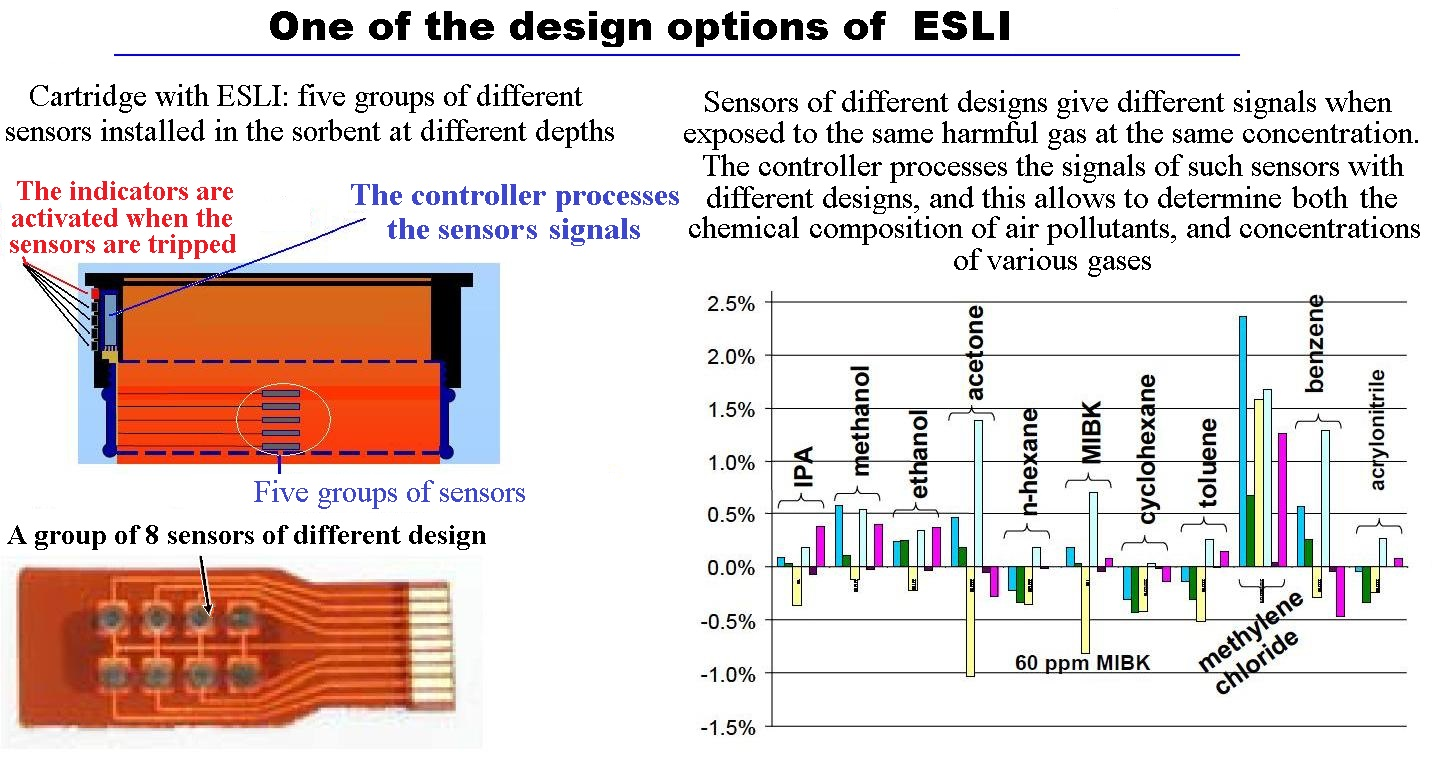
Sensors for an end-of-service-life indicator (ESLI) developed in US

Cartridge certification provides a minimum value of their sorption capacity. US OSHA standard for 1,3-Butadiene indicates the specific service life of the cartridges.

==== Laboratory testing ====
If the company has a laboratory with the right equipment, specialists can skip pumping the contaminated air through the cartridge and determine the degree of cleaning needed. This method enables one to determine the service life in an environment where the air is contaminated with a mixture of different substances that affect their capture with a sorbent (one affecting another capture). Service life calculation methods for such conditions have been developed relatively recently. However, this requires accurate information on concentrations of noxious substances, and they often are not permanent.

Tests in laboratories can identify the balance of service life of cartridges after their use. If the remainder is large, similar cartridges in such circumstances can be used over a longer period of time. In some cases, a large balance allows the use of cartridges repeatedly. This method does not require accurate information on the concentrations of harmful substances. The cartridge replacement schedule is drawn upon the basis of the results of their testing in the laboratory. This method has a serious drawback. The company must have complex and expensive equipment and trained professionals to use it, which is not always possible. According to a poll, cartridges replacement in the US was carried out on the basis of laboratory tests in approximately 5% of all organizations.

Research to determine whether it is possible to calculate the service life of respirator cartridges (if one knows the conditions of their use) have been conducted in developed countries since the 1970s. This allows one to replace cartridges in a timely fashion without the use of sophisticated and expensive equipment.

==== Computer programs ====
The world's leading respirator manufacturers offered customers computer programs for calculating the service life already in 2000.

Programs to determine the lifetime of the cartridges; original (in 2000).
Manufacturer of RPD	Program name	Number of substances (in 2000)	Types of gases and vapors	The range of polluted air temperatures, °С	Relative humidity, %	Air flow, l/min
AO Safety	Merlin	227	organic and inorganic	0-50	<50, 50–65, 65–80, 80-90	light, medium and heavy work
3М	3M Service Life Software	405 (more than 900 in 2013)	organic and inorganic	0, 10, 20, 30, 40, 50	<65, >65	20, 40, 60
MSA	MSA — Cartridge Life Calculator	169	organic and inorganic	freely chosen	0 - 100	30, 60, 85
North	ezGuide v. 1.0	176	organic and inorganic	freely chosen	<65, 66–80, >80	30, 50, 70
Survivair	Respirator Cartridge Service Life Program	189	organic and inorganic	from -7 to +70	<65, 66–80, >80	30, 50, 70

A 3M program allowed to calculate the service life of the cartridges exposed with more than 900 harmful gases and their combinations in 2013. A MSA program enables taking into account hundreds of gases and their combinations. The same program was developed by Scott and Dragerwerk. J. Wood developed a mathematical model and software that now allows one to calculate the service life of any cartridges with known properties. Now OSHA uses it in its Advisor Genius program.

The merit of this way of replacing the cartridges is that it allows an employer to use normal, "common" cartridges, and if they have the exact data, they may replace them in time. The downside is that because of air contamination is often not constant, and the nature of the work to be performed is not always stable (that is, the flow of air through the cartridges is not permanent), it is recommended to use working conditions for calculations, equal to the worst case, for reliable protection. However, in all other cases, cartridges will be replaced with a partially used sorbent. This increases the costs of respiratory protection due to more frequent cartridge replacements.

In addition, calculation accuracy is reduced under very high relative humidity, because the mathematical model does not take into account some of the physical effects in such cases.

==== End-of-service-life indicators ====
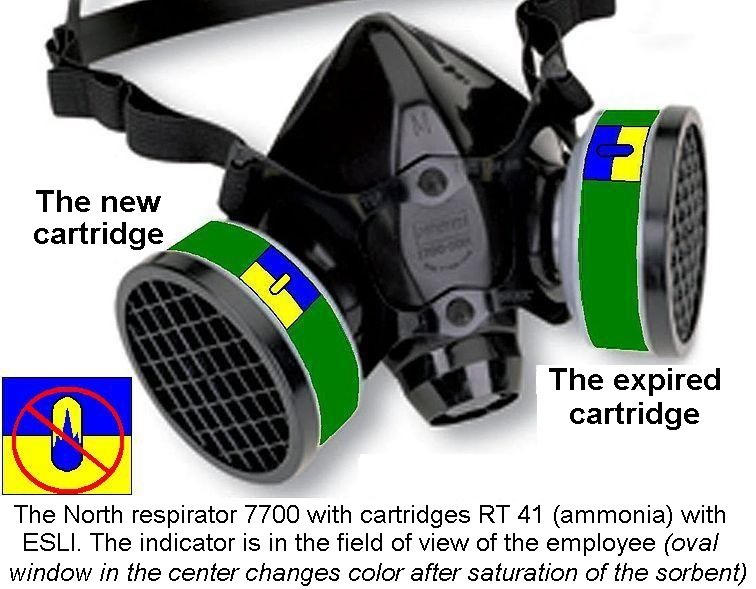
A half-mask respirator with cartridges with end-of-service-life indicators (ESLI) placed to be visible during operation. The color change indicates that the cartridge will cease to capture ammonia and must be replaced.

If a cartridge has a device to warn the user of the approaching expiration of the service life (end-of-service-life indicator, ESLI), the indication can be used for timely replacement of cartridges. ESLI can be active or passive. A passive indicator often uses a sensor that changes color. This element is installed in the cartridge at some distance from the filtered air outlet so that the color change occurs before harmful gases begin to pass through the cartridge. An active indicator may use a light or an audible alarm to signal that a cartridge needs to be replaced.

Passive end-of-service-life indicators

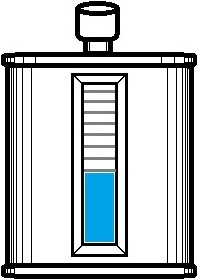
Yablick 1925

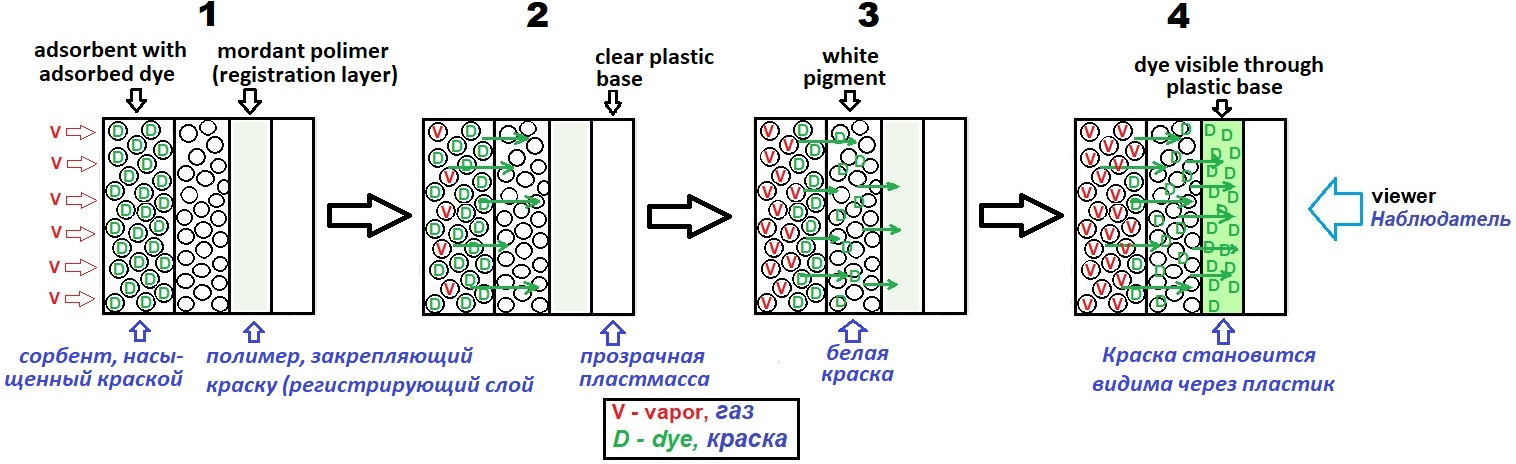
ChemMotif 2000

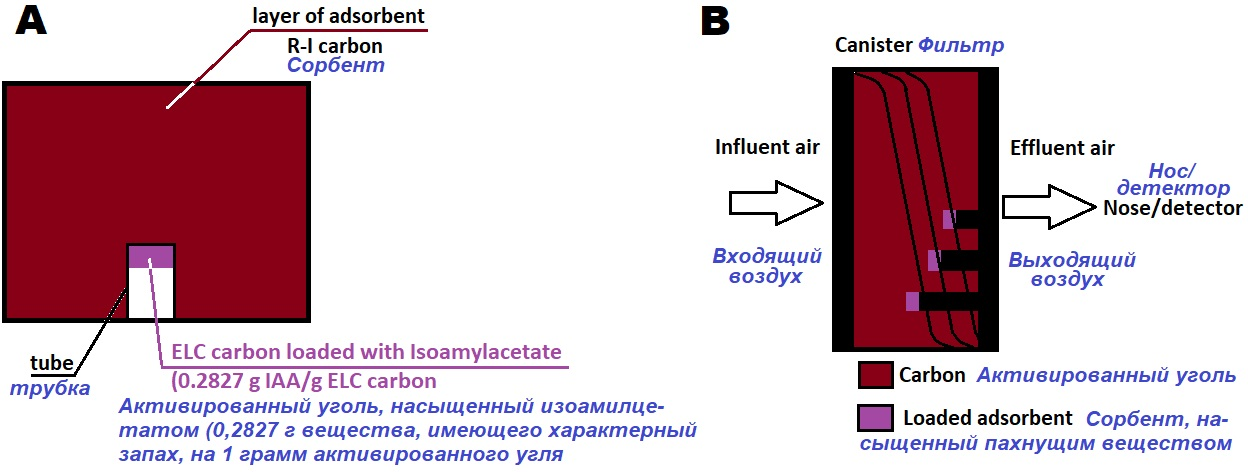
THO 1998 & Linders

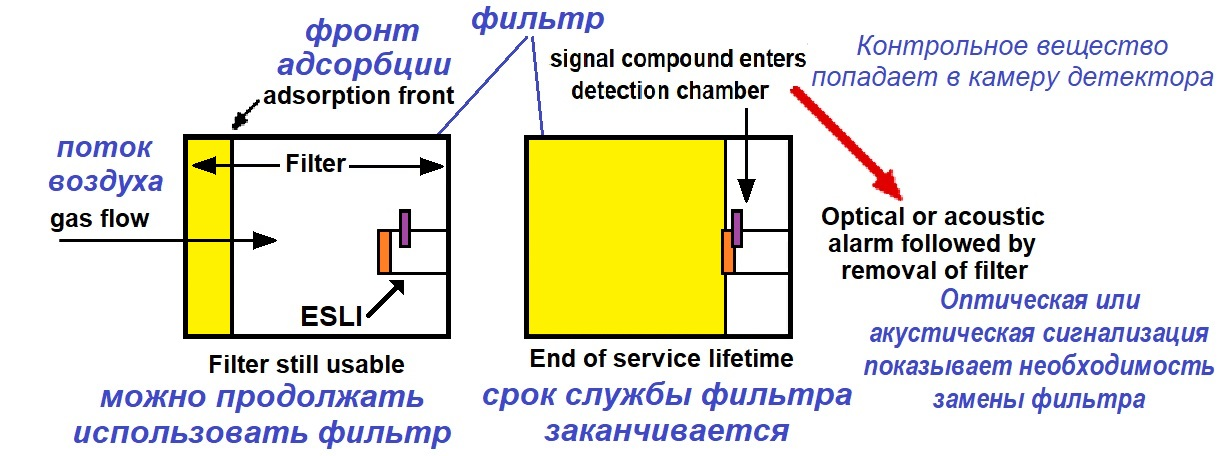
ТНО 2004

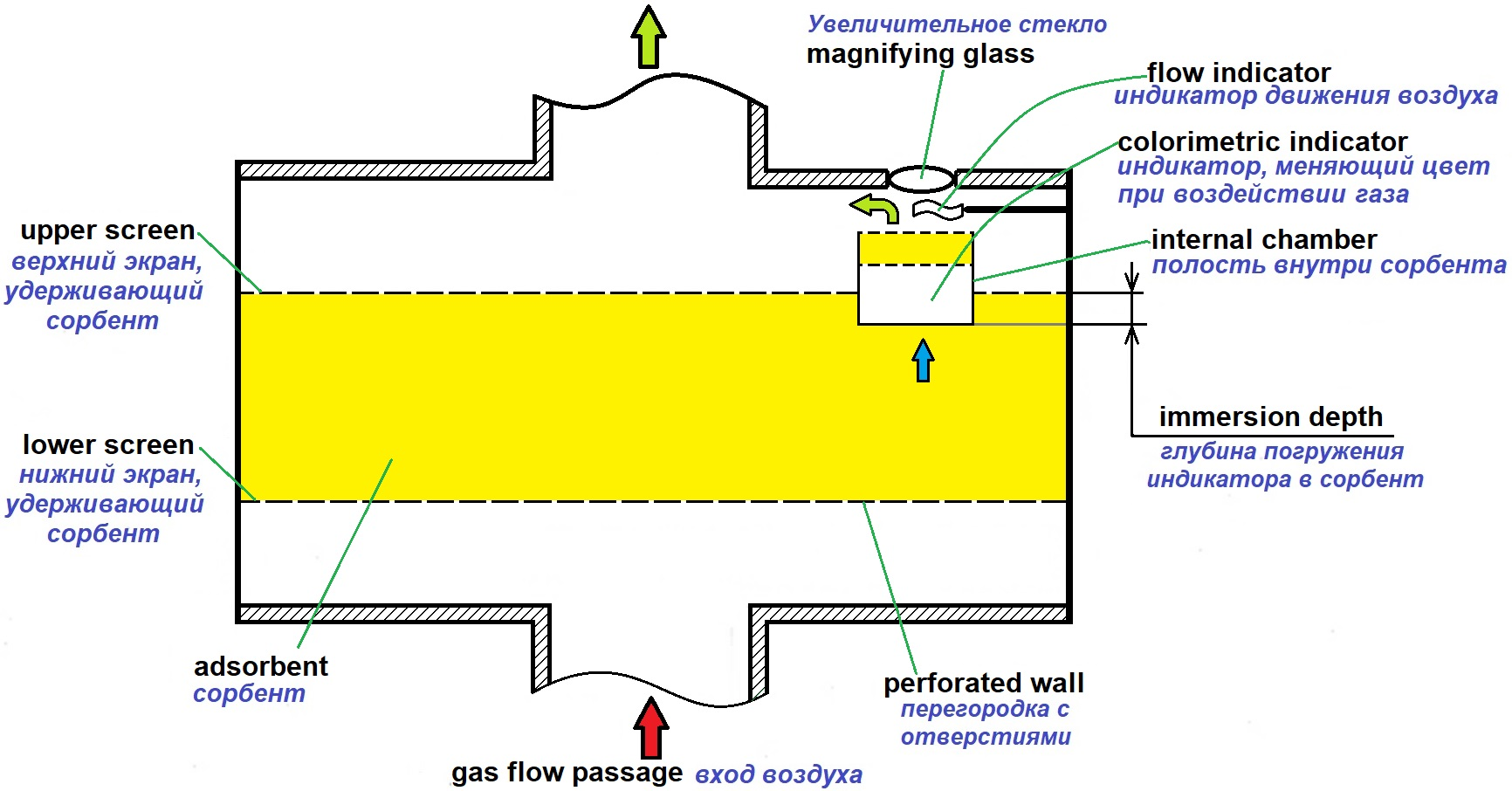
Dragerwerk 1986

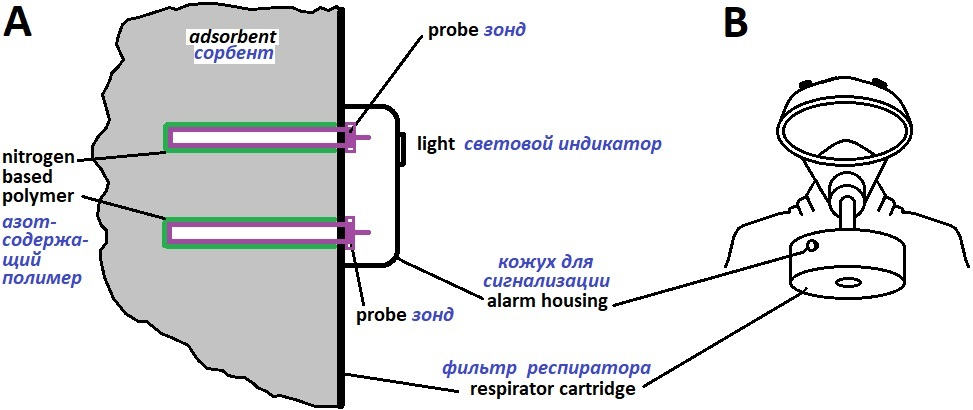
Wallace 1975

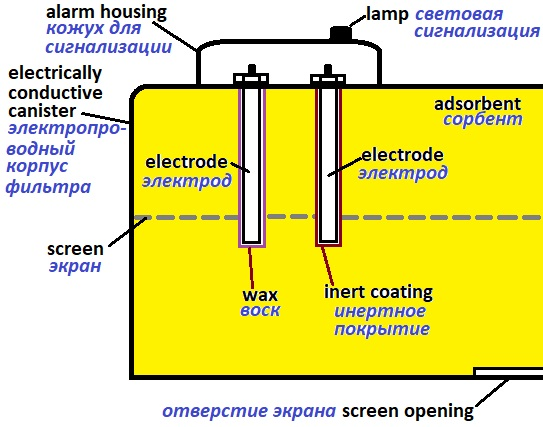
Wallace 1975

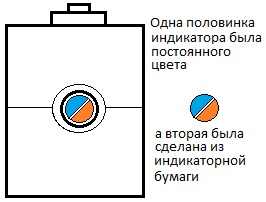
Roberts 1976

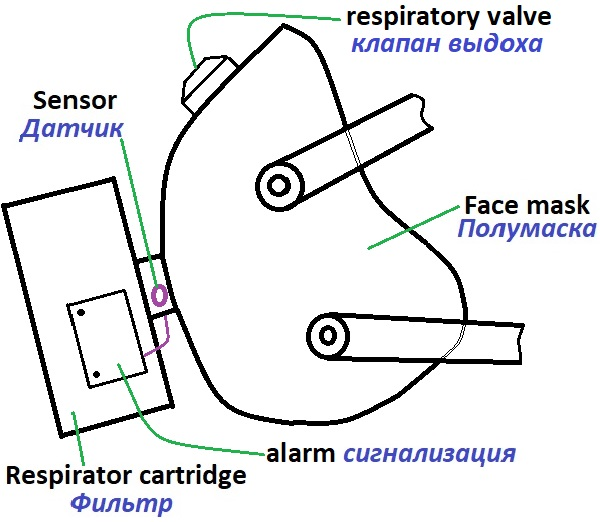
China 2001

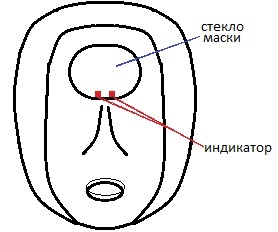
Dragerwerk 1957

Active indicators use light or an audible alarm triggered by a sensor (usually installed in the cartridge) for user notification. Such indicators allow one to replace the cartridges on time in any light and do not require the worker to pay attention to the color of the indicator. They can also be used by workers who badly distinguish different colors.

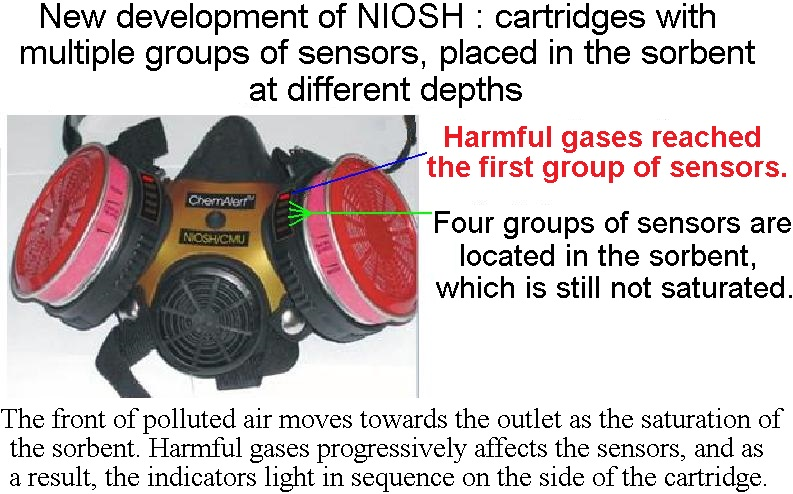
A NIOSH respirator with an active ESLI

Despite the presence of solutions for technical problems, and the availability of established certification requirements to the ESLI, during the period from 1984 (first certification standard with requirements for active ESLI) until 2013, not one cartridge with active ESLI was approved in the US. The requirements for the cartridges are not quite exact, and employers are under no requirement to use these indicators specifically. Therefore, respirator manufacturers fear commercial failure when selling new unusual products, although they continue to carry out research and development work in this area.

Active end-of-service-life indicators:

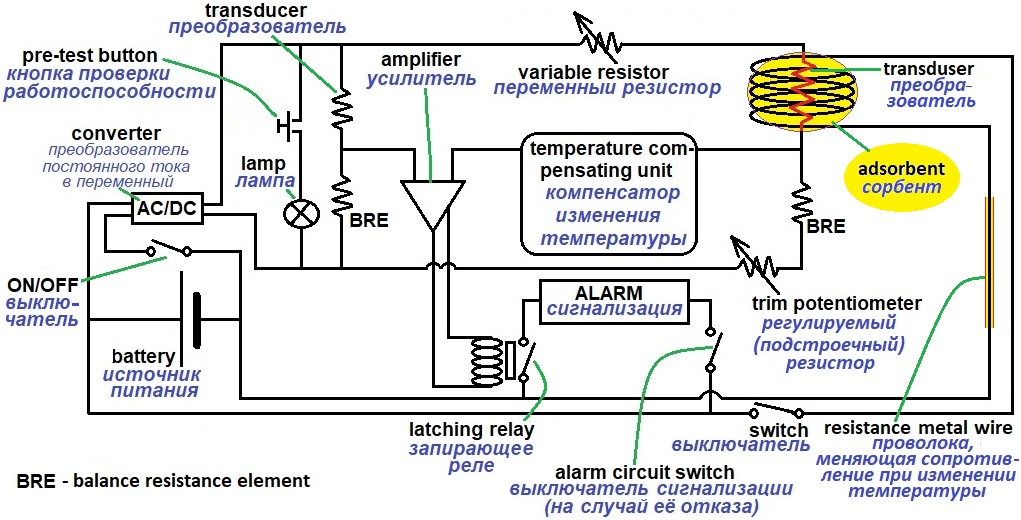
American Optical

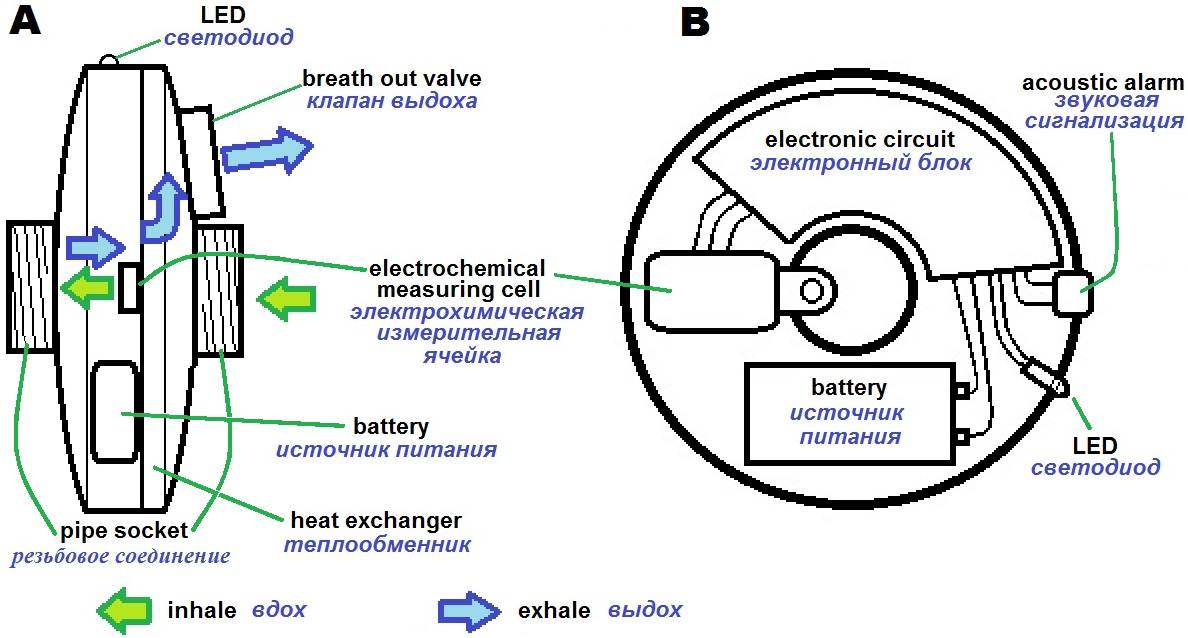
Auergesellschaft 1989

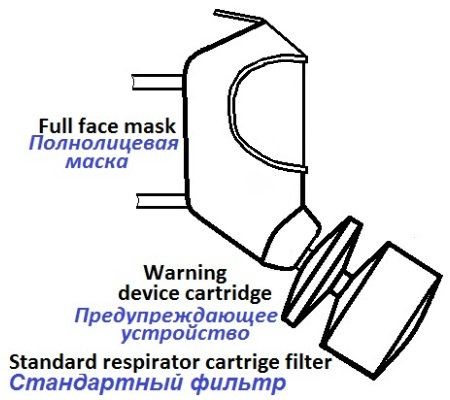
Auergesellschaft 1989

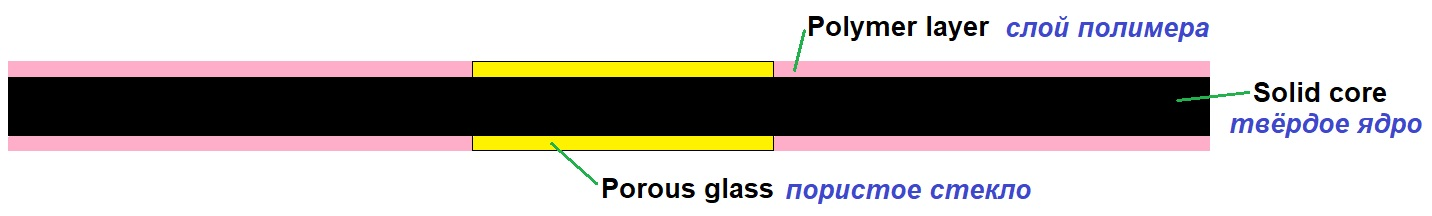
Bernard 1998

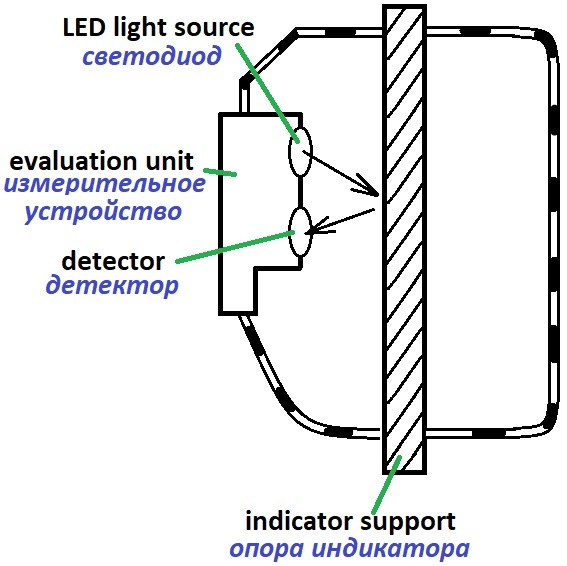
Dragerwerk 1994

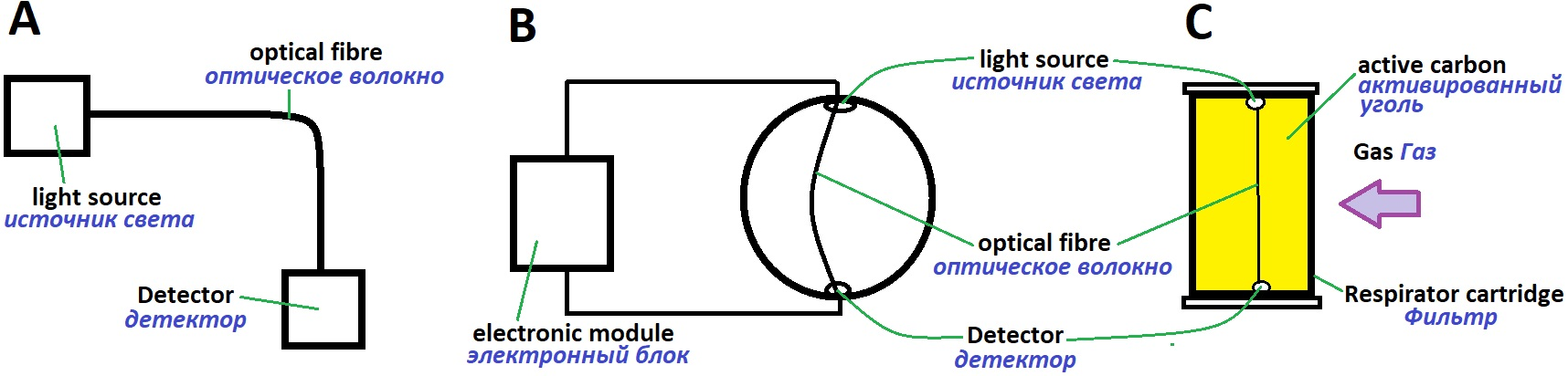
FOGS 1998

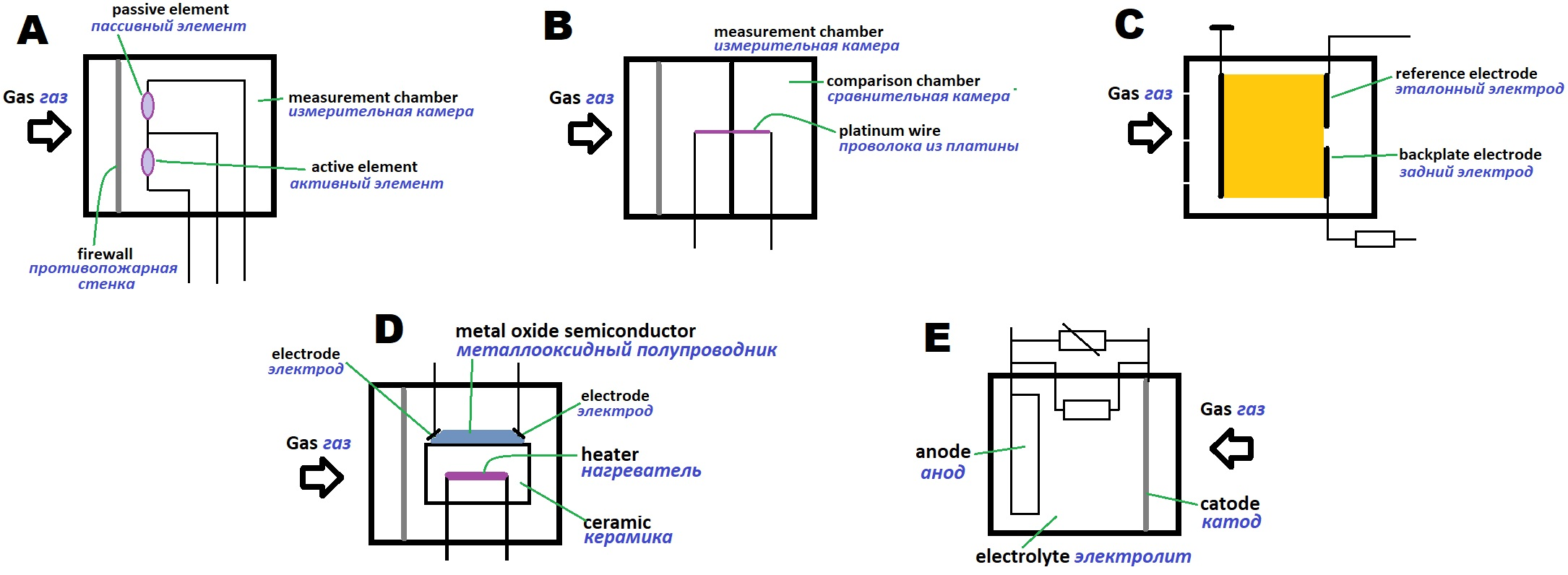
Geraetebau 1991

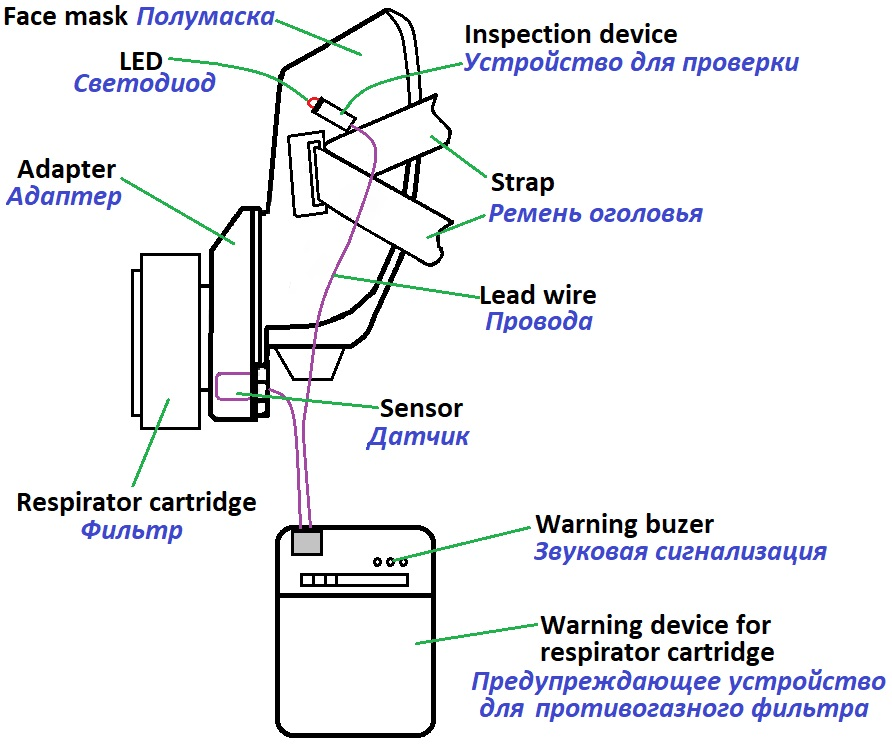
Shigematsu 2002

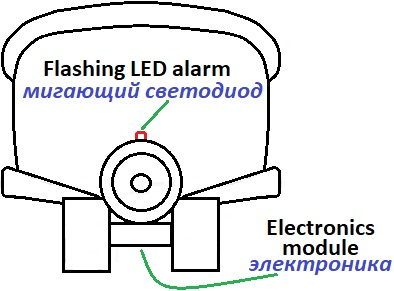
Stetter 1991

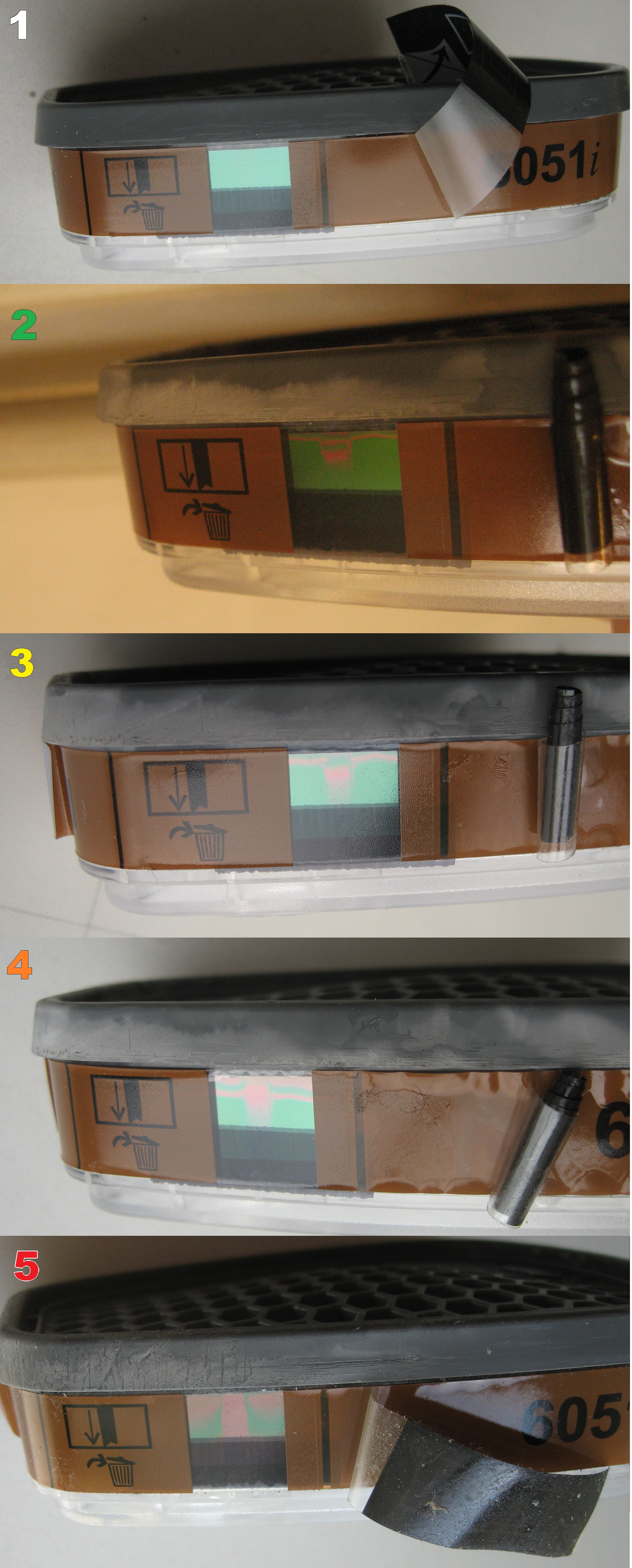
Cartridge for protection against organic vapors. A gradual change in the appearance of the ESLI is shown.

Examination of respirator use in the US showed that over 200,000 workers may be exposed to excessive harmful gases due to late replacement of cartridges. So, the Laboratory of PPE (NPPTL) at the NIOSH began to develop an active ESLI. After the completion of the work, its results will help establish clear legal requirements for employers to follow and resulting technology will be transferred to industry to use in new improved RPD.

=== Legal requirements ===
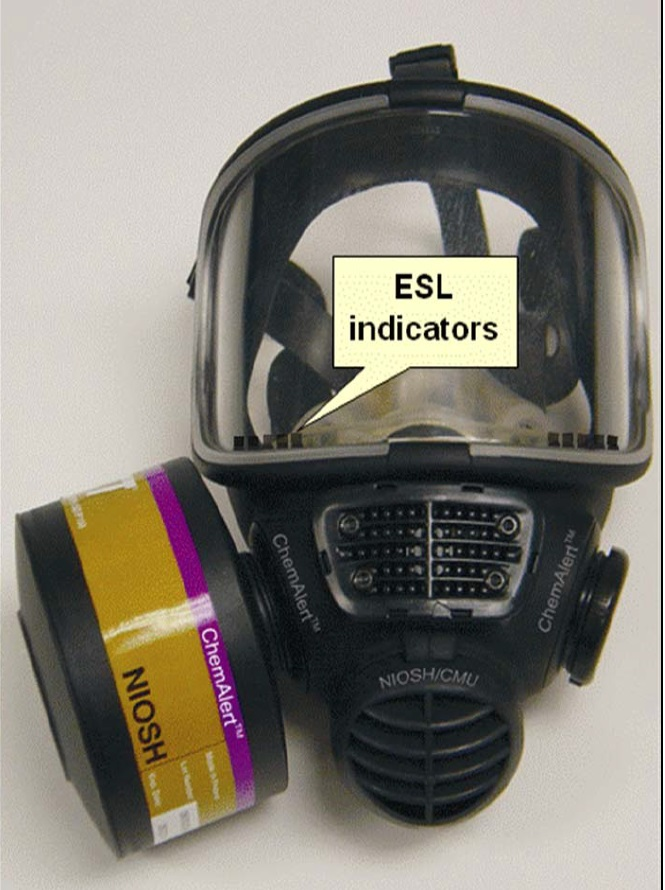
Full facepiece respirator canister equipped with (ESLI)

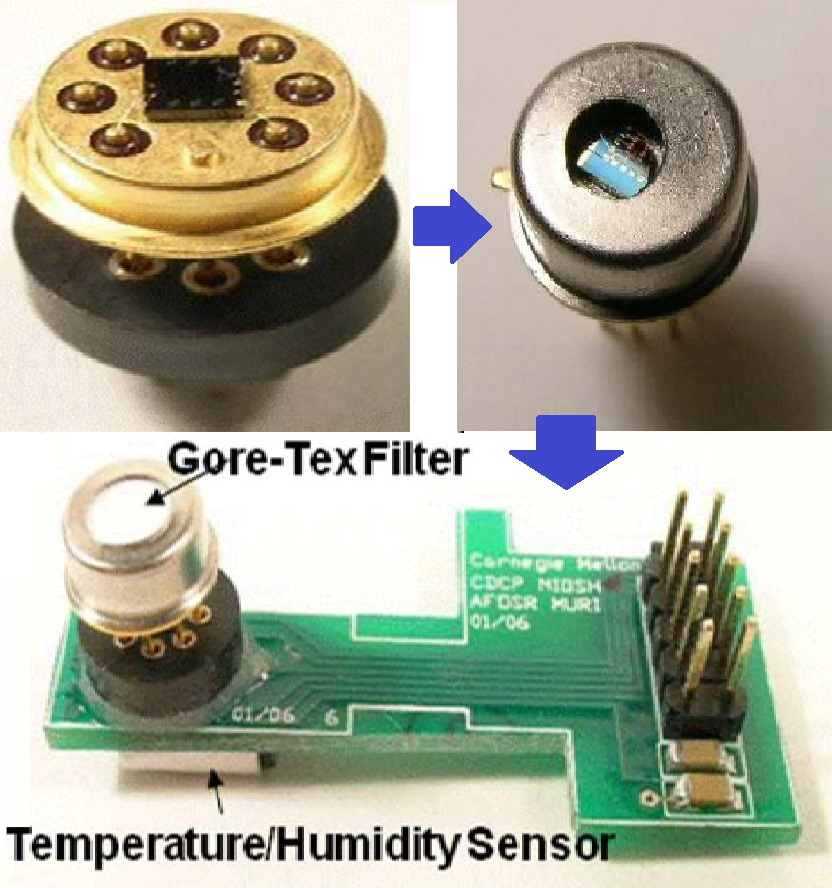
Sensor for an end-of-service-life indicator (ESLI)

Since it is not always possible to replace cartridges in a timely manner through the use of their odor ets, OSHA has banned the use of this method. The employer is obliged to use only two ways to replace cartridges: on schedule, and by using ESLI (because only these methods provide reliable preservation of workers' health). OSHA instructions to inspectors provides specific guidance on inspection of implementation of such requirements. On the other hand, the state requires manufacturers to provide the consumer with all necessary information about cartridges to allow one to make a schedule for their timely replacement. Similar requirements exist in the standard on occupational safety, governing selection and application of RPD in EU. In England a tutorial on the selection and use of respirators recommends obtaining information from the manufacturer, and replacing the cartridges on a schedule or use ESLI, and prohibits reusing cartridges after exposure of volatile substances that can migrate.

- The US law required the employer to use exceptionally supplied air RPD (SAR) for protection against harmful gases that have no warning properties. The use of supplied air respirators may be the only way to reliably protect workers in circumstances when there is no ESLI, and it is impossible to calculate their service life.
- Legislation in the EU allows an employer to use only supplied air respirators when employees work in conditions where air pollution is IDLH, because of the risk of untimely cartridge replacement.

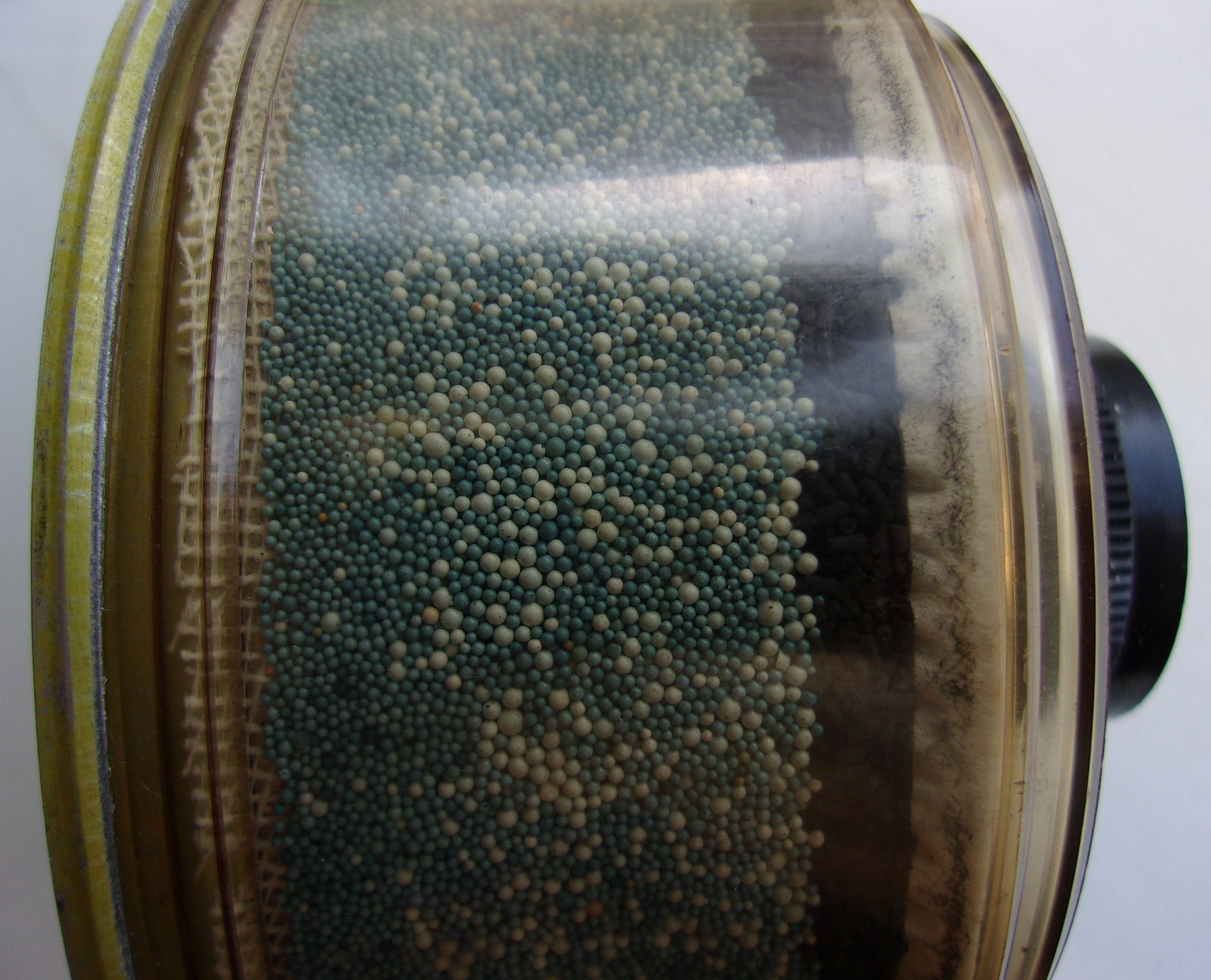
Combined gas and particulate respirator canister for protection against acid gases, the type of BKF (БКФ). It has a transparent body and special sorbent that changes color upon saturation. This color change may be used for timely replacement of respirator filters, like an end-of-service-life indicator, ESLI.

== Reuse ==
If the cartridge contains a lot of the sorbent and the concentration of contaminants is low, or the cartridge was used for a short time, the cartridge may be allowed to be used again.

The molecules of an entrapped gases may de-absorb during storage of the cartridge. Due to the difference of concentrations inside the body of the cartridge (at the inlet concentration is greater; at the outlet for purified air concentration is lesser), these de-absorbed molecules migrate inside the cartridge to the outlet. The study of cartridges exposed to methyl bromide showed that this migration can impede the re-use of stored cartridges. Concentration of harmful substances in the purified air may exceed the PEL (even if clean air is pumped through the cartridge). To protect worker health, US law prohibits cartridge reuse when exposed to harmful substances that can migrate, even if the cartridge has much non-saturated sorbent after the first use. According to the standards, "volatile" substances (those able to migrate) are considered substances with a boiling point below 65 °C. But studies have shown that at the boiling point above 65 °C reuse of the cartridge may be unsafe. Therefore, the manufacturer must provide the buyer with all information required for safe cartridge use. So, if the period of continuous service life of the cartridge (calculated by the program - see above) exceeds eight hours (see tables 4 and 5), the legislation may limit their use to one shift.

A procedure exists for calculating the concentration of harmful substances in purified air at the start of cartridge reuse, which allows one to determine exactly where they may be safely reused. But these scientific results are not yet reflected in any standards or guidelines on respirator use.

=== Regenerating gas cartridges ===
Activated carbon does not bond with harmful gases strongly, so they can be released later. Other sorbents undergo chemical reactions with the hazard and form strong bonds. Special technologies have been developed for recovery of used cartridges. They created conditions that have stimulated desorption caught earlier harmful substances. This used steam or heated air in the 1930s or other methods. Processing of the sorbent was carried out after its removal from the body of the cartridge, or without removing.

Specialists tried to use ion-exchange resin as the absorber in 1967. The authors proposed to regenerate the sorbent by washing it in a solution of alkali or soda.

The study also showed that cartridges can be effectively regenerated after exposure to methyl bromide (when they are blown with hot air 100 to 110 °C, flow rate 20 L/min, duration about 60 minutes).

Regeneration of sorbents is used consistently and systematically in the chemical industry, as it allows cost savings on the replacement of sorbent and regeneration of industrial gas cleaning devices to be carried out thoroughly and in an organized manner. However, in the mass use of gas masks under different conditions it is impossible to control the accuracy and correctness such regeneration of respirators' cartridges. Therefore, despite the technical feasibility and commercial benefits, regeneration of respirator cartridges in such cases is not carried out.
