= Glossary of breathing apparatus terminology =

Definitions of technical terms used in connection with breathing apparatus

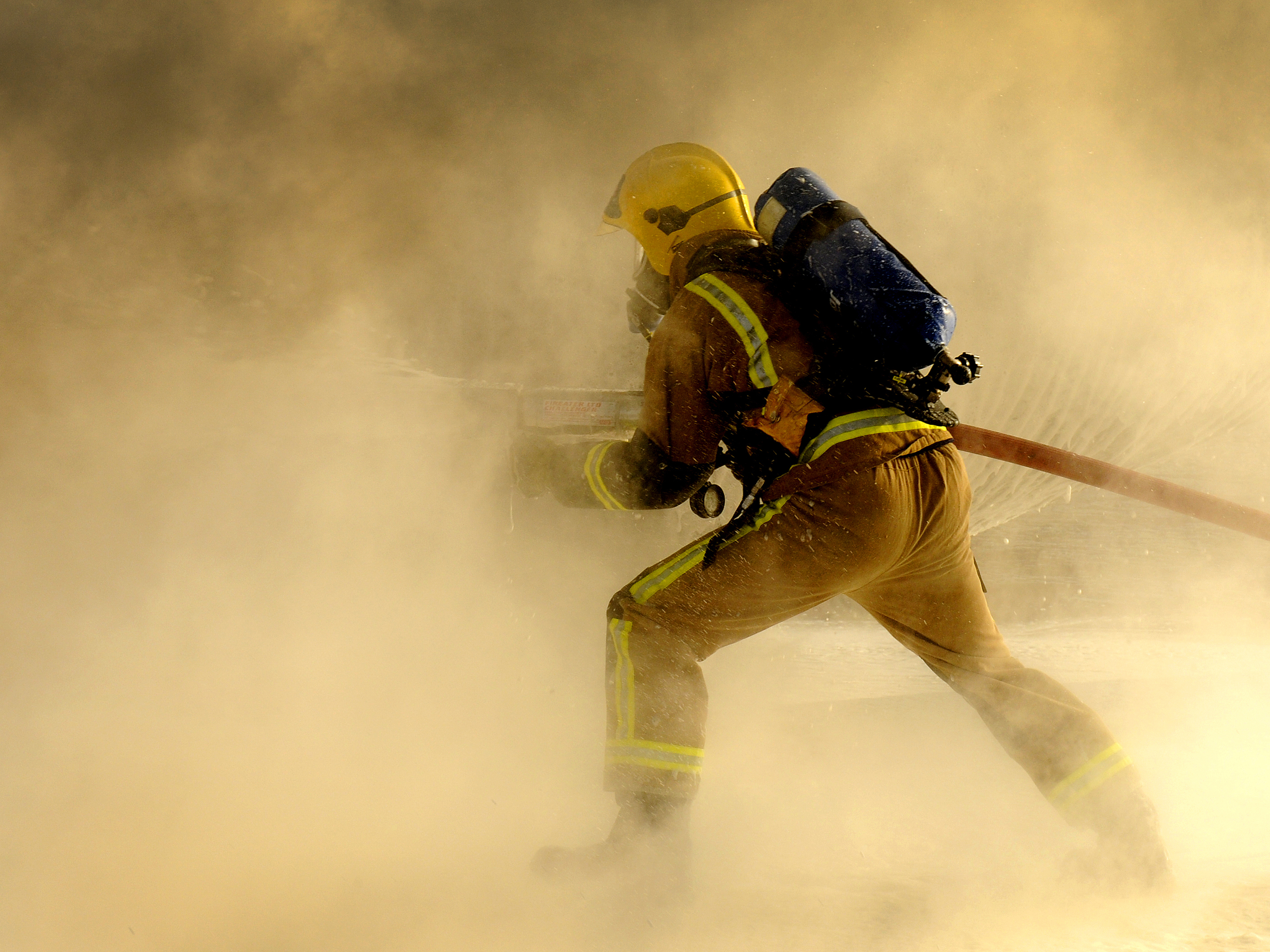
In an atmosphere that may be oxygen-deficient, or toxic, an air supply can be carried on the back.

A breathing apparatus or breathing set is equipment which allows a person to breathe in a hostile environment where breathing would otherwise be impossible, difficult, harmful, or hazardous, or assists a person to breathe. A respirator, medical ventilator, or resuscitator may also be considered to be breathing apparatus. Equipment that supplies or recycles breathing gas other than ambient air in a space used by several people is usually referred to as being part of a life-support system, and a life-support system for one person may include breathing apparatus, when the breathing gas is specifically supplied to the user rather than to the enclosure in which the user is the occupant.

All terms are defined in the context of breathing apparatus, and may have other meanings in other contexts not mentioned here. There are also many terms which are specific to underwater breathing apparatus (UBA) that may be found in the Glossary of underwater diving terminology.

== A ==
air-entrainment mask

air-filtering respirator
An air-filtering respirator is a breathing apparatus which removes particulates from the ambient air by passing it through an filter.
air-purifying respirator
An air-purifying respirator is a respirator which uses a filter, cartridge, or canister to remove specific air contaminants by passing ambient air through the air-purifying component. Contaminants may be filtered, adsorbed, or chemically altered by catalysis. No distinction is made based on the mechanism of passing the air through the purifying component – it may be the lungs of the user or a mechanical device.
air supplied respirator
air-supply respirator
atmosphere-supplying respirator
A breathing apparatus that supplies the user with breathing gas from a source independent of the ambient atmosphere, such as supplied-air respirators (SARs) and self-contained breathing apparatus (SCBA).
altitude-compensated constant flow
Supplemental oxygen delivery system that automatically compensates for altitude using a barometric pressure sensor.
ambulatory oxygen equipment
Supplementary oxygen delivery equipment weighing less than 10 pounds, intended for daily use, and designed to be carried by the patient. The supply should last from four to six hours at a flow rate of 2 litres per minute. Compare with portable oxygen equipment.
Some portable oxygen concentrators are designed for ambulatory oxygen therapy.
anaesthetic machine
anesthesia machine
An anaesthetic machine is a medical device used to generate and precisely mix a flow of medical gases and inhalational anaesthetic agents of variable composition for the purpose of inducing and maintaining anaesthesia.
anesthesia mask
anesthetic mask
anesthetic facemask
An anesthesia mask is an orinasal facemask with an inflated cuff seal used to deliver non-invasive ventilation (NIV) of oxygen, entenox and anesthetic gases and vapours. They are usually transparent, with a single port, and may have a detachable hook ring to attach straps.
aviation grade oxygen
gaseous aviator's breathing oxygen
High pressure oxygen of breathing grade with a lower allowable moisture content than medical oxygen.
aviation supplemental oxygen
Aviation supplemental oxygen is oxygen provided to aircrew or passengers to reduce the risk of hypoxia at the reduced ambient pressures due to high cabin altitude.

== B ==
bag valve mask
A bag valve mask is a hand-operated device used to provide positive pressure ventilation to patients who are not spontaneously breathing or not breathing sufficiently.
bilevel positive airway pressure
BiPAP
Breathing assist apparatus using a higher positive pressure on inspiration and lower positive pressure on expiration. Compare with continuous positive airway pressure
breathing apparatus
breathing set
A breathing apparatus is a set of equipment that facilitates breathing in a hostile environment or for a person unable to adequately breathe unaided.
breathing gas
A breathing gas is a mixture of gaseous chemical elements and compounds used for respiration. Air is the most common and only natural breathing gas, but other mixtures of gases, or pure oxygen, are also used in breathing equipment and enclosed habitats. Oxygen is the essential component for any breathing gas, at a partial pressure of between roughly 0.16 and 1.60 bar at the ambient pressure.
breathing helmet
1. A breathing helmet is a rigid respiratory user interface covering the head that also provides head protection against impact and penetration. A diving helmet is possibly the most familiar example.
2. In medical terminology, a breathing helmet is synonymous with a breathing hood, and need not have any rigid protective structure.
breathing hood
A breathing hood is a type of respiratory interface that completely covers the head and neck, and optionally the shoulders or upper torso, with a loose-fitting bag, which may have a neck seal or be relatively close fitting at the neck or shoulders. They are used in escape breathing apparatus of several kinds (escape hoods), and as a route for supplementary oxygen (oxygen hoods). Breathing hoods with full length visors are commonly used with free-flow supplied air respirators for industrial work like in spray painting, boatbuilding, and woodworking workshops. Atmosphere-supply hoods are often free-flow type, with a high enough flow rate to ensure that there is constant outflow at the lower edge to prevent contamination.
breathing mask
A breathing mask is a facepiece that covers the mouth and nose, and optionally other parts of the face or head, to constrain and direct the flow of breathing gas as part of a breathing apparatus.
bubble CPAP
Bubble CPAP is a non-invasive ventilation apparatus for newborns with infant respiratory distress syndrome (IRDS). It is one of the methods by which continuous positive airway pressure (CPAP) is delivered to a spontaneously breathing newborn to maintain lung volumes during expiration. With this method, blended and humidified air with supplemental oxygen is delivered via short binasal prongs or a nasal mask and pressure in the circuit is maintained by immersing the distal end of the expiratory tubing in water. The depth to which the tubing is immersed underwater limits the pressure generated in the airways of the infant by hydrostatic back-pressure.
built-in breathing system
A built-in breathing system is a source of breathing gas installed in a confined space where an alternative to the ambient gas may be required for medical treatment, emergency use, or to minimise a hazard. They are found in diving chambers, hyperbaric treatment chambers, and submarines.

== C ==
chemical oxygen
Lightweight and compact system for generating emergency oxygen supply by chemical reaction.
closed circuit breathing apparatus
Closed circuit breathing apparatus is equipment to facilitate breathing which recycles exhaled supplied breathing gas by removing carbon dioxide and adding oxygen to compensate for metabolic usage before returning the gas to the user for repeated inhalation. Also known as rebreather equipment.
continuous positive airway pressure mask
continuous positive airway pressure
Continuous positive airway pressure (CPAP) is a form of ventilation in which a level of pressure greater than ambient atmospheric pressure is continuously applied to the upper respiratory tract of a person. The application of positive pressure may be intended to prevent upper airway collapse, or to reduce the work of breathing.
counterlung
A counterlung on a rebreather is an airtight bag of strong flexible material that holds the volume of the exhaled gas until it is inhaled again. There may be a single counterlung, or one on each side of the scrubber, which allows a more even flow rate of gas through the scrubber, which can reduce work of breathing and improve scrubber efficiency by a more consistent dwell time.

== D ==
dead space
Physiological dead space is the volume of ventilated gas that does not reach parts of the lung in which gas exchange occurs. Breathing apparatus usually add some mechanical dead space to increase the total dead space of the system of breathing apparatus and user.
demand valve
A demand valve is a flow control mechanism that detects a pressure drop on the downstream side and opens the valve to compensate for the pressure drop. In supplied gas breathing apparatus this provides the user with a breath of gas at approximately the pressure set and maintained within the facepiece. When the user stops inhaling, the downstream pressure increases until the demand valve closes to stop the flow. A type of downstream pressure controlled pressure regulator that is relatively insensitive to upstream pressure.
diameter index safety system
DISS
Diameter index safety system is a type of outlet valve that uses one of a set of connections specific to the gas used to prevent delivery of the wrong gas.
diluter-demand
Supplementary oxygen supply system which provides oxygen via a demand valve and dilutes it with ambient air to a suitable concentration.
dust mask
A dust mask is a flexible paper filter held over the nose and mouth by elastic or rubber straps for personal comfort against non-toxic nuisance dusts. They are not intended to provide protection from toxic airborne hazards.

== E ==
elastomeric respirator
An elastomeric respirator is a reusable respirator made of rubber. They usually come with replaceable filters, and can be fitted with either chemical cartridges or particulate filters.
electrical pulse-demand oxygen system
A pulse dose oxygen conserving device with electrical bolus release control.
electronic delivery system
An electronic delivery system (EDS) is an electronically controlled system of supplemental oxygen delivery, which supplies a pulse dose (bolus) of oxygen at the start of inhalation to economise on oxygen use., See also electrical pulse demand oxygen system.
emergency escape breathing device
emergency evacuation breathing device
(EEBD) Emergency breathing apparatus intended to allow the user to escape from and enclosed space which is immediately dangerous to life or health. The endurance is generally no more than adequate for the purpose. Typically self-contained compressed air apparatus with 600 litres free air capacity. Required by amended SOLAS ch.II-2 and the IMO MSC/Circ.849 for all ships on international routes.
escape hood

Escape hoods are emergency breathing apparatus that entirely cover the head and provide a few minutes of autonomy to escape from a dangerous area.The main configurations are the smoke hood, which has a carbon monoxide and particulate filter, and the more general purpose escape hood which has an air purification cartridge that also removes other toxic gases from the ambient air. They are air purifying respiratory protective devices and can only be used if the ambient air contains enough oxygen.
escape breathing apparatus
escape respirator
escape set
An escape set is a type of self contained breathing apparatus for use in emergencies, intended to allow the user to pass through areas without a breathable atmosphere to a place of relative safety where the ambient air is safe to breathe. These are self contained ambient pressure systems, and include:
- Helicopter escape set
- Mine escape set
- Submarine escape set
- Amphibious Tank Escape Apparatus
escape only respirator
A respirator intended to be used only for emergency exit.

== F ==
facemask
face mask

1. An item of personal protective equipment that primarily guards the airways from a contaminated local environment, by either delivering safe breathing gas or as a filter or supporting structure for filters to purify ambient air. It may also protect the eyes and facial skin.
2. An item covering the mouth and nose for delivering supplemental oxygen or anesthetic gases.
3. An item covering the mouth and nose intended to protect the local environment from contamination by the breath of the user.
facepiece
A facepiece is the interface between the user and the breathing apparatus. It is the part of a breathing apparatus that fits against the user's face and through which the breathing gas passes during inhalation and exhalation. It may be sealed around the perimeter to prevent leakage to or from the environment, or may include a port to combine gas supply from the environment with gas supplied from the breathing apparatus. Also referred to as a mask, breathing mask, or facemask. Compare with mouthpiece, helmet and hood.
face tent
A mask that covers the nose and mouth but does not seal around the edges, used to provide a controlled concentration of oxygen over the lower face and increase moisture for patients who have facial burns or a broken nose, or who are claustrophobic. Difficult to control the concentration of oxygen delivered.
filtering facepiece respirator
A filtering facepiece respirator (FFP) is a disposable item of personal protective equipment in the form a facepiece produced from a whole piece of filtering material.
fullface mask
full-face mask
full-face breathing mask
A full-face breathing mask is a respiratory user interface that covers the eyes, nose, and mouth.

== G ==
gas extender
A gas extender is an apparatus for extending the endurance of a breathing gas supply, for example, by re-using some of the gas in a rebreather circuit.The term is relatively frequently applied to semi-closed rebreather systems, but is not used very often. Compare with oxygen conserving device and demand pulse device

== H ==
half-mask
A half mask is a facepiece covering the mouth and nose and extending over the chin.
hazardous materials
Hazardous materials are materials that pose a risk to health, safety, property or the environment by their presence.
hazmat environment
An environment which is immediately dangerous to life or health due to the presence of hazardous materials.
hazmat suit
A hazmat suit is personal protective equipment that consists of an impermeable whole-body garment worn as protection against hazardous materials. Such suits are often combined with self-contained breathing apparatus (SCBA) to provide breathable air.
heated humidified high-flow therapy
Heated humidified high-flow therapy, also known as high flow nasal cannula (HFNC) or high flow therapy (HFT), is a type of respiratory support that delivers a flow of medical breathing gas to a patient of up to 60 L/min and 100% oxygen through a large bore nasal cannula. originally used for neonates, it is also effective in some adults to treat hypoxemia and work of breathing issues. The key components are a gas blender, heated humidifier, heated circuit, and cannula.
helium reclaim system
A helium reclaim system is the equipment used to recover exhaled helium based breathing gas from surface-supplied divers so that it can be recycled, as a cost saving mechanism.
high flow nasal oxygen therapy
High flow nasal oxygen therapy is a system which uses a heated and humidified blend of air and oxygen delivered via a high flow nasal cannula (HFNC). It is a standard of care in some clinical situations for infants, children, and preterm neonates and is finding increasing use for adults.
high flow oxygen device
A high flow oxygen device is a supplementary oxygen delivery system with relatively high flow rates of a consistent mixture. An example is the venturi mask.
Hudson mask
A Hudson mask is a type of simple oxygen mask
humidifier
A humidifier is a device for conditioning breathing gas by adding water vapour.
hyperbaric
hyperbaric environment
An environment in which the ambient pressure is significantly higher than sea level atmospheric pressure.
hypobaric
hypobaric environment
An environment in which the ambient pressure is significantly lower than sea level atmospheric pressure.

== I ==
iron lung
An iron lung is a type of negative pressure ventilator (NPV), a mechanical respirator which encloses most of a person's body, and varies the air pressure in the enclosed space, to effect ventilation.

== L ==
liquid oxygen system
Lightweight and compact oxygen supply system using a stored cryogenically liquefied oxygen source.

== M ==
mechanical filter
A mechanical filter (respirator) is a type of filter for air-purifying respirators that mechanically blocks particulates from reaching the wearer's nose and mouth.
medical grade oxygen
medical oxygen
The International Pharmacopoeia specifies that Medical oxygen produced by air liquefaction has a purity of at least 99.5% oxygen by volume. The World Health Organization (WHO) specifies that for pressure swing adsorption (PSA) plants, medical oxygen produced from ambient air has 93±3% oxygen, and for oxygen concentrators, 82% from room air (21%).

== N ==
N95 respirator
An N95 filtering facepiece respirator, commonly abbreviated N95 respirator, is a particulate-filtering facepiece respirator that meets the U.S. National Institute for Occupational Safety and Health (NIOSH) N95 classification of air filtration, meaning that it filters at least 95% of airborne particles that have a mass median aerodynamic diameter of 0.3 micrometers.
nasal cannula
A nasal cannula is tubing used to deliver supplemental oxygen at levels from 1 to 6 L/min. It has two short prongs that fit into the nostrils for delivery, that are connected to a common tube, which is usually hooked over the ears. See also reservoir cannula
nasal mask
A nasal mask is a user respiratory interface which covers the nose and seals against the upper lip, the sides of the nose, and the bridge of the nose.
nasal pillow mask
A nasal pillow mask is a respiratory user interface which seals on the rim of the nostrils. It is used in stable patients with sleep-disordered breathing.
negative pressure breathing
1. (medical) Ventilation in which the surface of the thorax is exposed to pressure below the ambient pressure during inspiration. Used as a method of artificial respiration (iron lung).
2. (diving) Breathing where the pressure of the breathing gas at the mouth is lower than the ambient pressure at the thorax. This can happen due to hydrostatic effects with back mounted counterlungs or badly adjusted cracking pressure on a demand regulator.
negative pressure ventilator
A negative pressure ventilator (NPV) is a type of mechanical ventilator that stimulates an ill person's breathing by periodically reducing the external air pressure on their body to expand the chest cavity.
non-invasive ventilation
Non-invasive ventilation (NIV) is the use of medical breathing support administered through a face mask, nasal mask, or a helmet. It is termed "non-invasive" because it is delivered without a need for tracheal intubation.
non-rebreather mask
A non-rebreather mask (NRB) is a device used to deliver supplemental oxygen to a spontaneously breathing person. An NRB allows the delivery of relatively high concentrations of oxygen while using a constant flow rate, with relatively low waste, by accumulating the oxygen flow during exhalation in a soft bag, to be inhaled at the start of the next breath, so a bolus of oxygen is taken into the deeper parts of the lungs where much of it reaches the alveoli where gas exchange takes place.
normobaric
normobaric environment
Having an ambient barometric pressure similar to the normal atmospheric pressure at sea level.

== O ==
on-board oxygen generating system
Aircraft system which passes engine compressor bleed air through an oxygen concentrator, heat exchanger and pressure regulator to provide oxygen enriched pressurised air for the aircrew.
open circuit breathing apparatus
Open circuit breathing apparatus is breathing apparatus that does not recycle any of the breathing gas, and discharges it all to the surroundings. Open circuit breathing apparatus may be further classified as continuous flow (or free-flow) or demand supplied. Both constant flow and demand supply can also provide gas from two sources, one of them being the ambient atmosphere, in what is generally referred to as supplemental oxygen provision.
oral mask
An oral mask is a respiratory user interface which fits inside the mouth between the teeth and lips, with a guide to prevent the tongue from obstructing the airway. They are not often used.
orinasal mask
oro-nasal mask
An orinasal mask, oro-nasal mask, or oral-nasal mask is a breathing mask that covers the mouth and the nose only. It may be a complete independent item, as an oxygen mask, or on some anaesthetic apparatus, or it may be fitted as a component inside a fullface mask on underwater breathing apparatus, a gas mask or an industrial respirator to reduce the amount of dead space. It is usually designed for its lower edge to seal on the front of the lower jaw.
oxygen concentrator
An oxygen concentrator is a device that concentrates the oxygen from a gas supply (typically ambient air) by selectively removing nitrogen to supply an oxygen-enriched product gas stream. They are used industrially, to provide supplemental oxygen at high altitudes, and as medical devices for oxygen therapy.
oxygen conserving device
An oxygen conserving device is a mechanism that makes more efficient use of the available oxygen by a breathing apparatus. Several approaches to this problem have been used, with variable efficiency, complexity, reliability and weight tradeoffs. Often safety and reliability are more important than efficiency, and the overall risk must be considered.
oxygen hood
An oxygen hood is a plastic hood used for high flow oxygen therapy in infants. It surrounds the head and has an opening for the neck. A high flow rate is necessary to prevent carbon dioxide accumulation. Supplied gas must be warmed and humidified.
oxygen mask
An oxygen mask is an interface between an oxygen delivery system and the human user. It provides a method to transfer oxygen breathing gas from a storage tank or other source to the lungs. Oxygen masks may cover only the nose and mouth (oral-nasal mask) or the entire face (full-face mask).
oxygen tent
An oxygen tent is a delivery method for supplemental oxygen. It consists of a canopy placed over the whole body or part of the body including the nose and mouth, into which an oxygen enriched gas supply is introduced, at a rate which will avoid excessive buildup of carbon dioxide.

== P ==
partial rebreather mask
A partial rebreather mask is an orinasal mask used for oxygen therapy for people who are spontaneously breathing. It allows full flow from the reservoir bag during inhalation, but only allows exhaled gas from the anatomical dead space where no gas exchange has occurred to reenter the reservoir bag during exhalation, The rest of the exhaled gas is dumped to the ambient atmosphere. The gas admitted to the reservoir bag is rebreathed on the next inhalation along with fresh gas. It typically delivers 50 to 80% oxygen.
particulate respirator
See mechanical filter.
pin index safety system
PISS
Pin index safety system is a medical gas high pressure connection standard using connectors with indexing pins specific to the gas to prevent supply of the wrong gas. Compare with low pressure diameter index safety system DISS.
pocket mask
pocket CPR mask
A pocket mask, pocket face mask or CPR mask, is a compact device used to safely deliver rescue breaths during a cardiac arrest or respiratory arrest by providing a sealed connection to the respiratory tract that is isolated from direct contact with the recipient's exhalations by a filter or non-return valve.
portable gaseous oxygen system
Aircraft emergency oxygen system using a high pressure oxygen cylinder with regulator as supply.
portable oxygen equipment
Supplementary oxygen provision equipment that is easily moved but not designed to be carried, and weighs more than about 10 pounds (4.5 kg). Compare with ambulatory oxygen equipment
positive airway pressure
Positive airway pressure (PAP) is a mode of respiratory ventilation used in the treatment of sleep apnea, respiratory failure, in newborn infants (neonates), and for the prevention and treatment of atelectasis in patients with difficulty taking deep breaths.
positive pressure breathing
1. (diving) Breathing when pressure of the breathing gas at the mouth exceeds the ambient pressure at the thorax. Can be caused by use of a positive pressure mask, upright position, chest mounted rebreather counterlung, or supine position with a twin-hose regulator.
2. (medical) Providing ventilation to a patient using positive pressure delivered by a ventilator or bag valve mask
3. (altitude) Providing oxygen pressurised above cabin pressure to a person in a partial-pressure suit at very high altitude.
positive pressure breathing apparatus
(occupational health and safety, diving) Breathing apparatus in which pressure of the supplied gas in the facepiece exceeds the ambient pressure at all times. Any leakage at the facepiece seal is outward and contamination from the environment is less likely.
positive pressure personnel suit
A Positive pressure personnel suit (PPPS) is a type of personal protective equipment (PPE), an airtight type of hazmat suit, which is designed to maintain a positive internal pressure to prevent contamination of the wearer even if the suit is damaged.
powered air-purifying respirator
A powered air-purifying respirator (PAPR) is a type of respirator that consists of a headgear-and-fan assembly that passes ambient air through purifying units that remove contaminants and deliver clean air to the inside of the headgear covering the user's face or mouth and nose. Also known as positive-pressure masks, blower units, or just blowers.
pressure controlled ventilation
Mechanical ventilation in which breaths are provided at a set pressure and a set rate. Volume delivery may vary from breath to breath depending on lung compliance.
pressure-demand system
Oxygen supply system that provides pure oxygen on demand at a pressure slightly above ambient, as is necessary for cabin altitudes above 34,000 feet. A type of positive pressure breathing system used with a pressure suit.
pressure regulated volume control
Mechanical ventilation which is a combination of pressure and volume controlled ventilation. A preset tidal volume is delivered at a set rate at the lowest possible pressure.
pressure support ventilation
Pressure controlled mechanical ventilation triggered by patient effort.
protective breathing equipment
Protective breathing equipment is a term for breathing apparatus required for aircraft cabin crew in terms of 69 FR 40528.
pulse dose oxygen conserving device
demand pulse device
Oxygen delivery device that senses the start of inhalation and provides a metered bolus, which if correctly matched to requirements, will be sufficient and effectively inhaled into the alveoli. Such systems can be pneumatically or electrically controlled.
pulse oximeter
A pulse oximeter is a non-invasive device that monitors pulse rate and blood oxygen saturation level.
push-pull system

== Q ==
quarter-mask

== R ==
rebreather
A rebreather is a closed circuit or semi-closed circuit breathing apparatus that absorbs the carbon dioxide of a user's exhaled breath to permit the recycling of the substantially unused oxygen content, and unused inert content when present, of each breath. Oxygen is added to replenish the amount metabolised by the user. This differs from open-circuit breathing apparatus, where the exhaled gas is discharged directly into the environment. The purpose is to extend the breathing endurance of a limited gas supply, conserve expensive gases, and for underwater use, reducing or eliminating the bubbles produced by an open circuit system. A rebreather is generally understood to be a portable unit carried by the user. The same technology on a vehicle or non-mobile installation is more likely to be referred to as a life-support system.
regulator
A pressure regulator (colloquially regulator), is a valve that controls the pressure of a fluid to a desired value, using negative feedback from the controlled pressure. Regulators are used for gases and liquids, and can be an integral device with a pressure setting, a restrictor and a sensor all in the one body, or consist of a separate pressure sensor, controller and flow valve. Two baasic types may be distinguished: The pressure reduction regulator which mainatains a set pressure on the outlet side, and the back-pressure regulator which maintains a set pressure on the inlet side. .
reservoir cannula
A reservoir cannula is an oxygen conserving supplemental oxygen administration device which accumulates constant flow oxygen in a small reservoir below the nose during exhalation and delivers in a bolus it at the beginning of the next inhalation, which ensures that most of it reaches the parts of the lung in which gas exchange occurs, and little is wasted in dead space.
respirator
1. A respirator may refer to a breathing apparatus that purifies ambient atmosphere, making it fit to breathe.
2. See ventilator. Medical breathing apparatus that provides breaths to a person impaired in their ability to breathe.
respiratory gas humidification
Respiratory gas humidification is the process of artificially conditioning respiratory gas for the patient during therapy, and involves humidification, warming, and occasionally filtration of the gas being delivered.
respiratory protection
respiratory protective equipment
Respiratory protective equipment (RPE) is a type of personal protective equipment designed to protect the wearer from a variety of airborne hazards in the form of gas, fume, mist, dust or vapour over the long or short term. Respirators filter the ambient air to remove harmful materials and atmosphere supplying breathing apparatus provides clean breathing gas to the user.
resuscitator
A resuscitator is apparatus using positive pressure to inflate the lungs of an unconscious person who is not breathing, in order to keep them oxygenated and alive. There are three basic types: a manual version (also known as a bag valve mask) consisting of a mask and a large hand-squeezed plastic bulb using ambient air, or with supplemental oxygen from a high-pressure tank. The second type is the expired air or breath powered resuscitator. The third type is an oxygen powered resuscitator. These are driven by pressurized gas delivered by a regulator, and can either be automatic or manually controlled.

== S ==
scrubber
A carbon dioxide scrubber is equipment that absorbs carbon dioxide from gas passed through it. In breathing apparatus it is a container packed with carbon dioxide absorbent material, mostly strong bases, through which the exhaled gas passes. The absorbent may be granular or in the form of a moulded cartridge. Gas flow through the scrubber may be in one direction in a loop rebreather, or both ways in a pendulum rebreather.
self-contained breathing apparatus
A self-contained breathing apparatus (SCBA) is a type of atmosphere-supplying respirator in which the breathing gas source is carried by the user.
self-contained self-rescue device
self-contained self-rescuer
A self-contained self-rescue device, SCSR, self-contained self-rescuer, or air pack is a small, lightweight belt or harness-worn portable apparatus for providing breathable gas when the surrounding atmosphere lacks oxygen or is contaminated with toxic gas. There are two forms of SCSR: respirators and rebreather oxygen sources. Compare with escape set and escape respirator
self-contained underwater breathing apparatus
A scuba set is a type of self-contained breathing apparatus intended for use underwater.
semi-closed circuit
A semi-closed circuit rebreather, also sometimes called a gas extender, is a class of self contained breathing apparatus in which a single breathing gas mixture such as nitrox or trimix is injected into the loop at a constant rate to replenish oxygen consumed from the loop by the diver. Excess gas must be constantly vented from the loop in small volumes to make space for fresh, oxygen-rich gas. As oxygen and inert gas are continuously vented, semi-closed circuit is wasteful of both oxygen and inert components, but much less so than open circuit.
simple face mask
A simple face mask (SFM) is a basic disposable mask, made of clear plastic, to provide oxygen therapy for spontaneously breathing patients who need a concentration of supplemental oxygen in the range of 40 to 60%. Simple face masks are low flow delivery systems.
smoke hood
A smoke hood is an airtight bag with a transparent visor worn over the head and sealed at the neck. It has an air filter connected to the outside atmosphere with a mouthpiece to breathe through. Smoke hoods are emergency respirators intended to protect people escaping from fire from the effects of smoke inhalation.
supplied-air respirator
A supplied-air respirator (SAR) or air-line respirator is a breathing apparatus used in places where the ambient air may not be safe to breathe. It uses an air hose to supply air from outside the danger zone to a facepiece.
synchronised intermittent mandatory ventilation
Ventilator mode to provide assisted ventilation for patients with some spontaneous breathing effort.

== U ==
User respiratory interface
A user respiratory interface is the delivery system by which the breathing apparatus controls breathing gas flow to and from the user. Compare with facepiece.

== V ==
ventilator
A ventilator is a medical breathing apparatus that provides breaths to a person impaired in their ability to breathe.
venturi mask
A venturi mask, also known as an air-entrainment mask, is a medical device to deliver a known oxygen concentration to patients on controlled oxygen therapy.
volume control ventilation
A preset tidal volume is delivered at a set rate by mechanical ventilator. Peak pressure can vary from breath to breath depending on lung compliance, and may be limited by an alarm setting.
volume support ventilation
Ventilator support of patient initiated breathing based on a set volume delivery.

== W ==
work of breathing
the energy expended to inhale and exhale a breathing gas. It is usually expressed as work per unit volume, for example, joules per litre, or as a work rate (power), such as joules per min or equivalent units, as it is not particularly useful without a reference to volume or time. It can be calculated in terms of the pulmonary pressure multiplied by the change in pulmonary volume, or in terms of the oxygen consumption attributable to breathing.

== See also ==
- Glossary of underwater diving terminology
