= Breathing mask =

A breathing mask is a mask that covers the mouth, nose, and optionally other parts of the face or head, designed to constrain and direct the wearer's breath to and/or from a particular breathing apparatus. It may mean, or be part of, one of these types:

- In medical treatment
  - For cardiopulmonary resuscitation
    - Bag valve mask, a device used in resuscitation of non-breathing casualties, optionally using supplementary oxygen.
    - Pocket CPR mask, a simpler mask used for mouth-to-mouth resuscitation; easier to carry than bag valve masks
  - For supplying oxygen or oxygen enriched air
    - Built-in breathing system (BIBS) mask, an oro-nasal mask providing treatment, decompression, or emergency gas in a hyperbaric chamber
    - Non-rebreather mask, an oro-nasal mask used in medicine to assist in the delivery of oxygen therapy
    - Oxygen mask, which covers the mouth and nose of a patient undergoing oxygen therapy as first aid or longer-term treatment, or a passenger in an aircraft which has depressurised at altitude
  - Continuous positive airway pressure mask
  - Anesthetic mask
- For infection control
  - Surgical mask, also known as a procedure mask, is intended to be worn by health professionals during surgery, to protect the patient from being infected by the operating theatre staff's breath.
  - Cloth mask; early surgical masks were cloth. Cloth masks are also used for protection in pandemics.
  - Respirators (see below) may also be used for infection control
- As a personal protective equipment respirator a device designed to protect the wearer from inhaling harmful dusts, fumes, vapors or gases
  - Air-filtering respirators
    - Dust mask, a flexible pad held over the nose and mouth by elastic or rubber straps to protect against dusts encountered during construction or cleaning activities. Usually uncertified, and thus not considered a "respirator" in some jurisdictions.
    - Filtering facepiece respirator, a stiffish dome of filter material fitting over the nose, cheeks, and chin. May look like some dust masks, but is certified.
    - Elastomeric respirator, with the facepiece made of flexible elastomer, usually reusable with disposable filters. May protect against particulates, gasses, or both, depending on the filters used.
      - Gas mask, respirator designed to protect the user from toxic gases in conflicts
      - Early smoke-mask respiratorss for firefighters (similar to diving helmets, but with air-filtering)
  - Atmosphere-supplying respirators
    - SCBA mask, or BA mask, a full face mask covering the mouth, nose and eyes of a person wearing self-contained breathing apparatus, connected to a breathing gas supply carried by the user
      - Rebreather mask
    - Underwater breathing masks
      - Full face snorkelling mask, a watertight mask with integrated air passages allowing the user to breathe atmospheric air while swimming face-down at the surface of the water
      - Full face diving mask, watertight masks covering the eyes, nose and mouth, allowing the wearer to breathe underwater from a self-contained or surface-supplied breathing gas supply
      - Band mask, a heavy duty full-face diving mask for surface-supplied diving
      - Diving helmet, covering the entire head in a dome of air.
- By coverage
  - Quarter-mask or orinasal mask, covering the mouth and nose only
  - Half-mask (disambiguation), from below the eyes to below the chin
  - Fullface mask, from above the eyes to below the chin
