= Orinasal mask =

Breathing mask that covers the mouth and the nose only

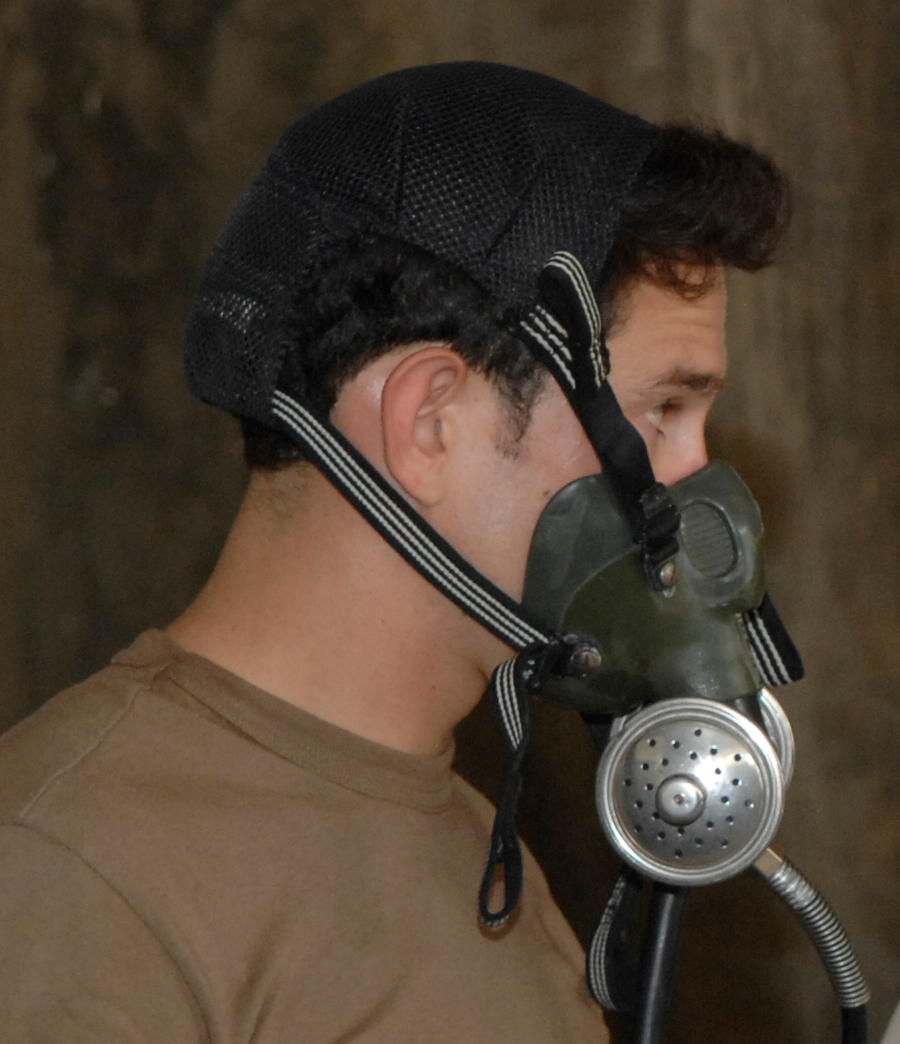
BIBS mask for oxygen provision in a hyperbaric chamber

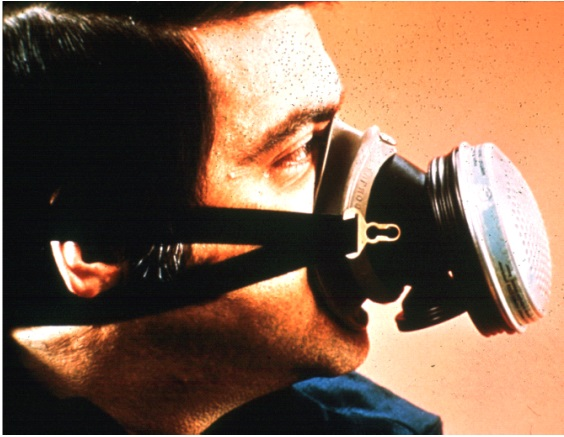
Sealing to the front of the lower jaw

An orinasal mask, oro-nasal mask or oral-nasal mask is a breathing mask that covers the mouth and the nose only. It may be a complete independent item, as an oxygen mask, or on some anaesthetic apparatuses, or it may be fitted as a component inside a fullface mask on underwater breathing apparatus, a gas mask or an industrial respirator to reduce the amount of dead space. It may be designed for its lower edge to seal on the front of the lower jaw or to go under the chin.

An orinasal mask may carry a filter for ambient air, or be supplied from a user-carried breathing gas supply or a remote gas supply using a supply hose. Another application is the resuscitation pocket mask, which is used as an infection barrier between the rescuer and a non-breathing casualty for expired air resuscitation.

== Applications ==
=== Stand-alone orinasal units ===
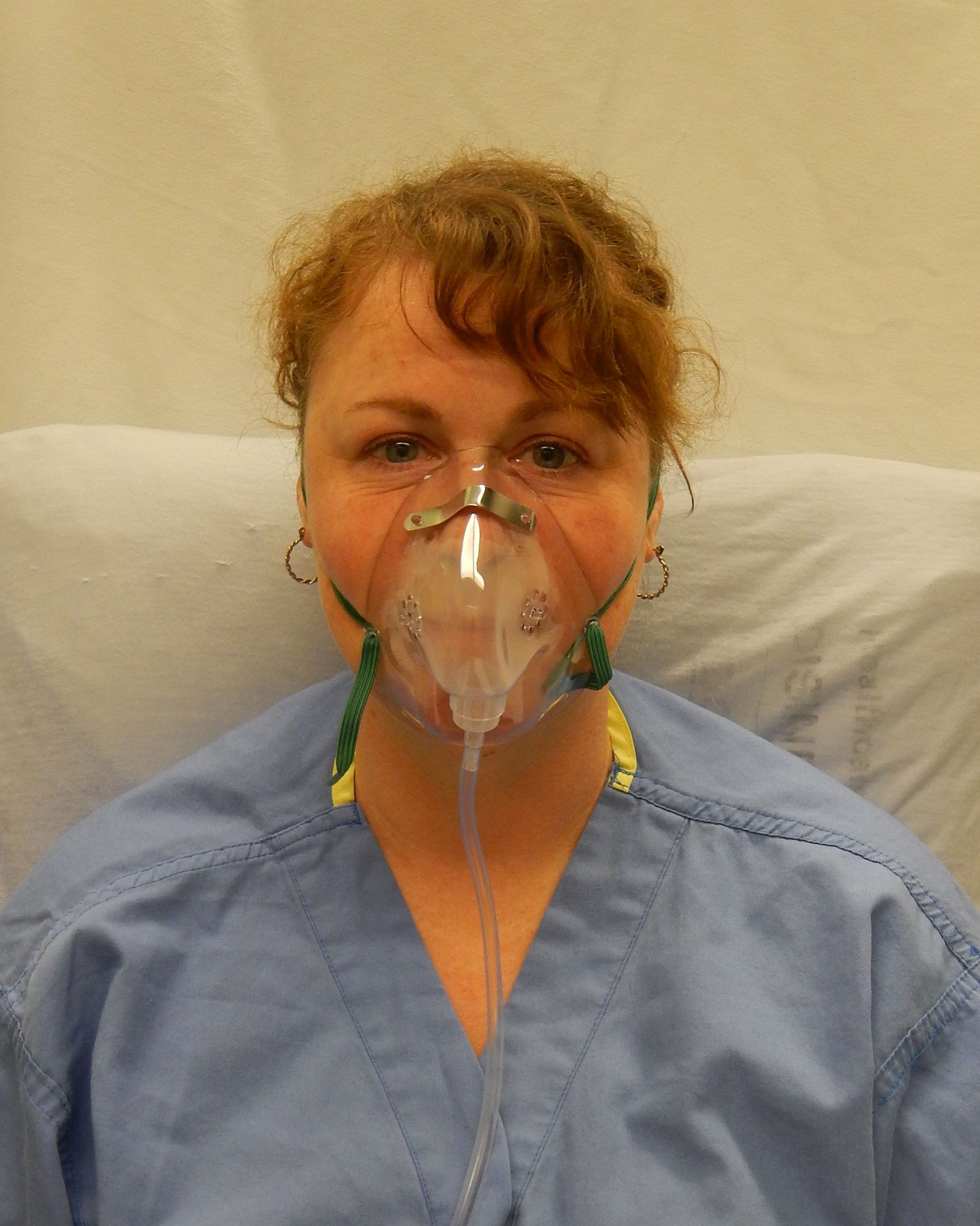
Simple orinasal face mask for oxygen therapy at normal atmospheric pressure

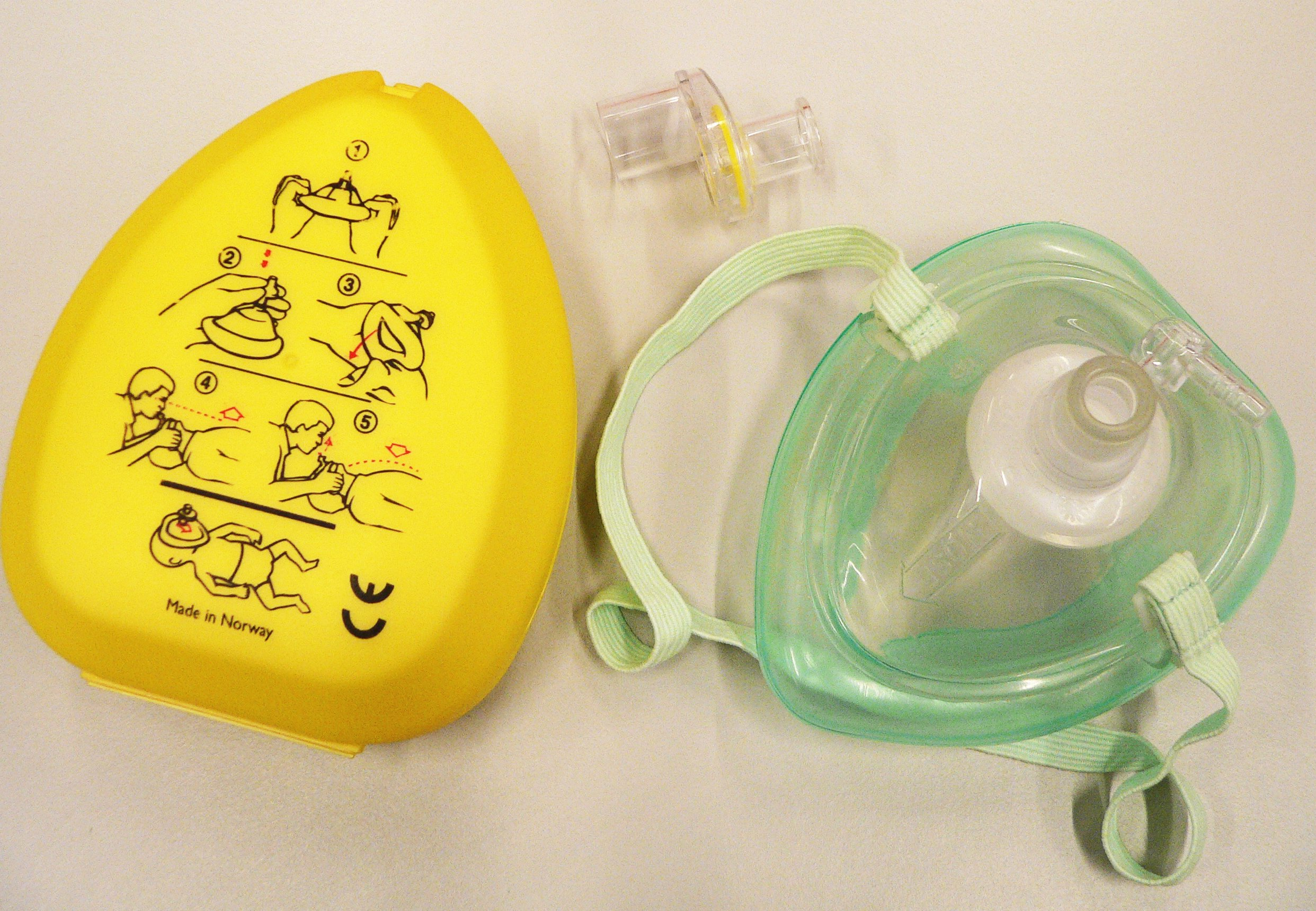
CPR pocket mask

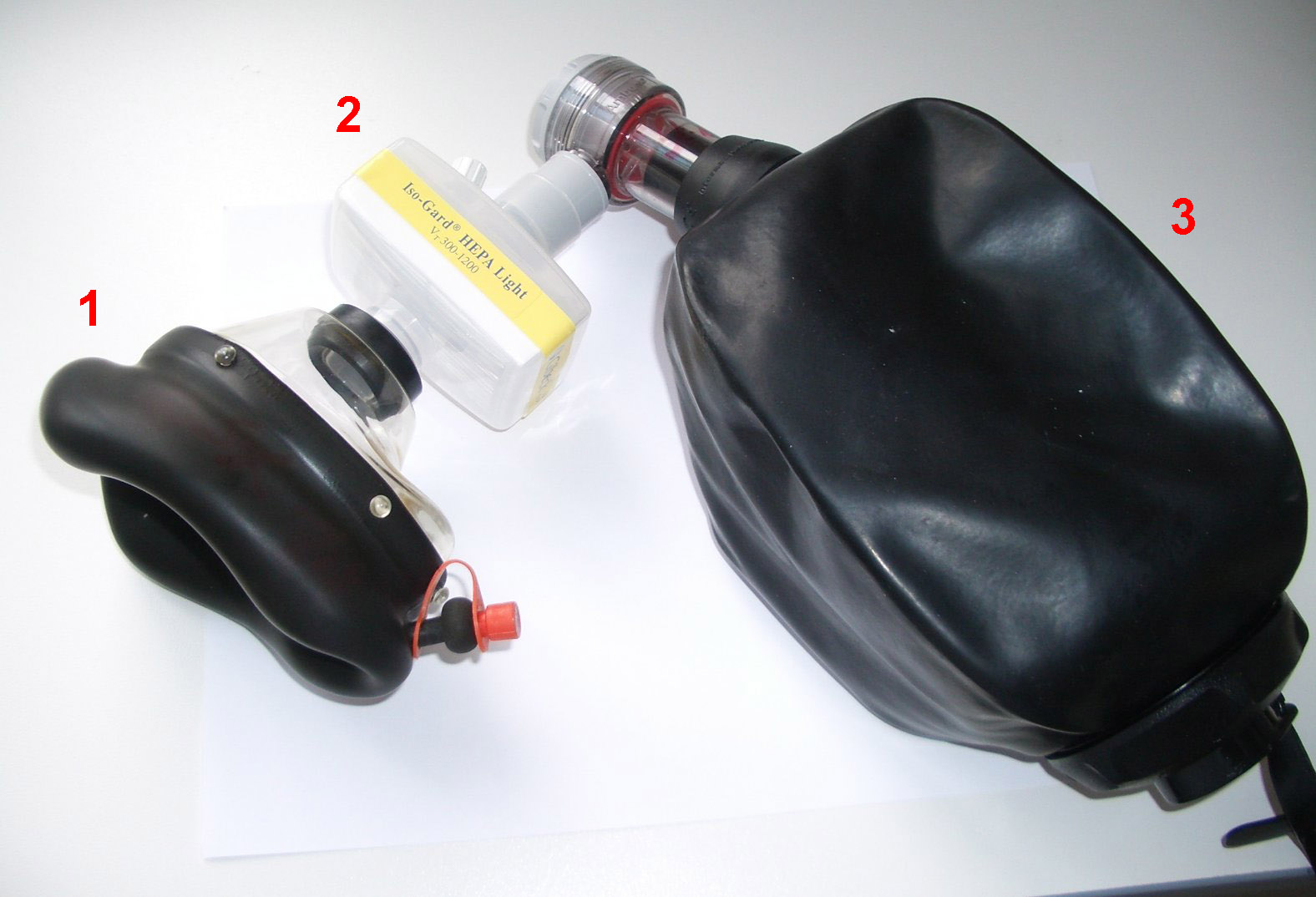
Bag valve mask. Part 1 is the flexible mask to seal over the patients face, part 2 has a filter and valve to prevent backflow into the bag itself (prevents patient deprivation and bag contamination) and part 3 is the soft bag element which is squeezed to expel air to the patient

- Hyperbaric oxygen provision: The built-in breathing systems (BIBS) used for providing oxygen for treatment and accelerated decompression in hyperbaric chambers usually uses an orinasal mask fitted with supply and exhaust regulators, that effectively isolate the high oxygen concentration breathing gas supply from the lower oxygen concentration chamber atmosphere to reduce the fire risk associated with high partial pressures of oxygen.
- Industrial particulate removal: A dust mask is a flexible pad held over the nose and mouth by elastic or rubber straps to protect against dusts encountered during construction or cleaning activities, such as dusts from drywall, brick, wood, fiberglass, silica (from ceramic or glass production), or sweeping. A dust mask can also be worn to protect against allergens.
- Industrial gas and vapour removal: An air purifying respirator is a device designed to protect the wearer from inhaling hazardous atmospheres, including particulate matter such as dusts and airborne microorganisms, and hazardous fumes, vapours and gases by filtering a contaminated atmosphere.
- Anaesthesia masks: An anaesthetic machine is a medical device used to generate and mix a fresh gas flow of medical gases and inhalational anaesthetic agents for the purpose of inducing and maintaining anaesthesia. For some applications an orinasal mask may be used to deliver the gas. The machine is commonly used together with a mechanical ventilator, breathing system, suction equipment, and patient monitoring devices.
- CPR pocket masks: A pocket mask, or CPR mask, is a device used to safely deliver rescue breaths during a cardiac or respiratory arrest. The specific term "Pocket Mask" is the trademarked name for the product manufactured by Laerdal Medical AS.
- Bag-valve resuscitation masks: A bag valve mask, manual resuscitator or self-inflating bag, is a hand-held device commonly used to provide positive pressure ventilation to patients who are not breathing or not breathing adequately. The device is a required part of resuscitation kits for trained professionals in out-of-hospital settings (such as ambulance crews) and is also frequently used in hospitals as part of standard equipment found on a crash cart, in emergency rooms or other critical care settings. One version is self-filling with air, although additional oxygen can be added but is not necessary for the device to function.
- Oxygen masks: An oxygen mask provides a method to transfer breathing oxygen gas from a storage tank to the lungs, usually for medical treatment. Several models are in use depending on how much oxygen is needed

=== Internal components of full face units ===
Where an orinasal mask is used as an internal component of a fullface mask, helmet or hood, its function is generally to reduce dead space, allowing effective use of demand supplied gas or a breath driven rebreather loop. They are not necessary if the breathing gas supply is abundantly in excess of physiological requirements in a free-flow or powered rebreather loop. They also function to minimise contact of high humidity exhaled gas with the internal surfaces of the viewports, and thereby reduce condensation on the viewports in cold conditions, which adversely affects the user's view of the surroundings.

- Lightweight demand diving helmets and full-face masks: The orinasal mask is a standard component on demand controlled underwater breathing apparatus using a large internal volume, as it is effective at reducing dead space.
- Military gas masks: Gas masks may use an orinasal mask inside to reduce dead space and fogging of the viewports.
- Industrial personal protective full face masks:
- Hazmat suits:Hazmat suit
- Firefighting and rescue breathing apparatus:Self-contained breathing apparatus often uses a full-face mask to protect the user's eyes from smoke or other contaminants. The orinasal mask is also used to minimise dead space and fogging in this application.
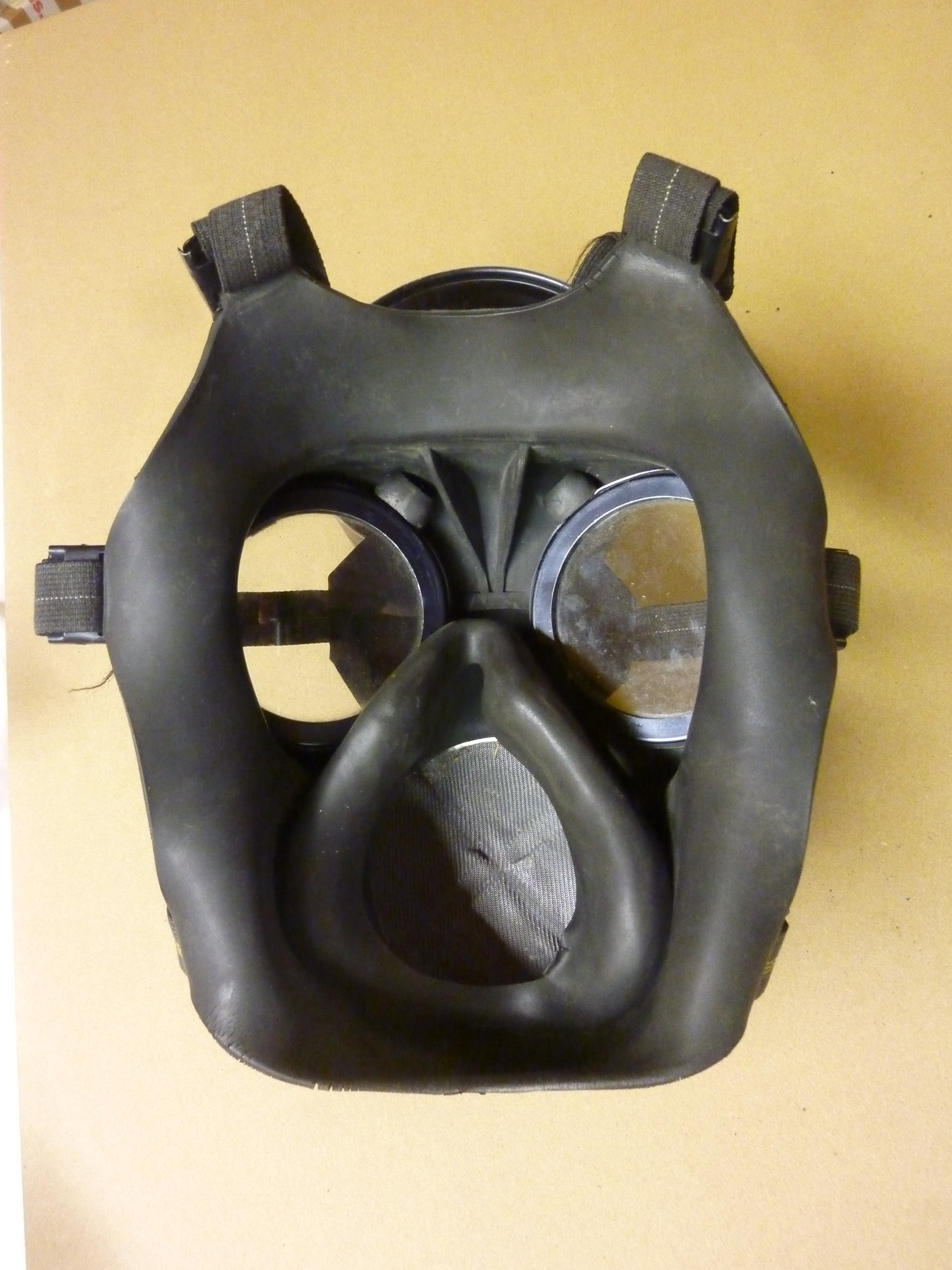
Orinasal mask inside a gas mask

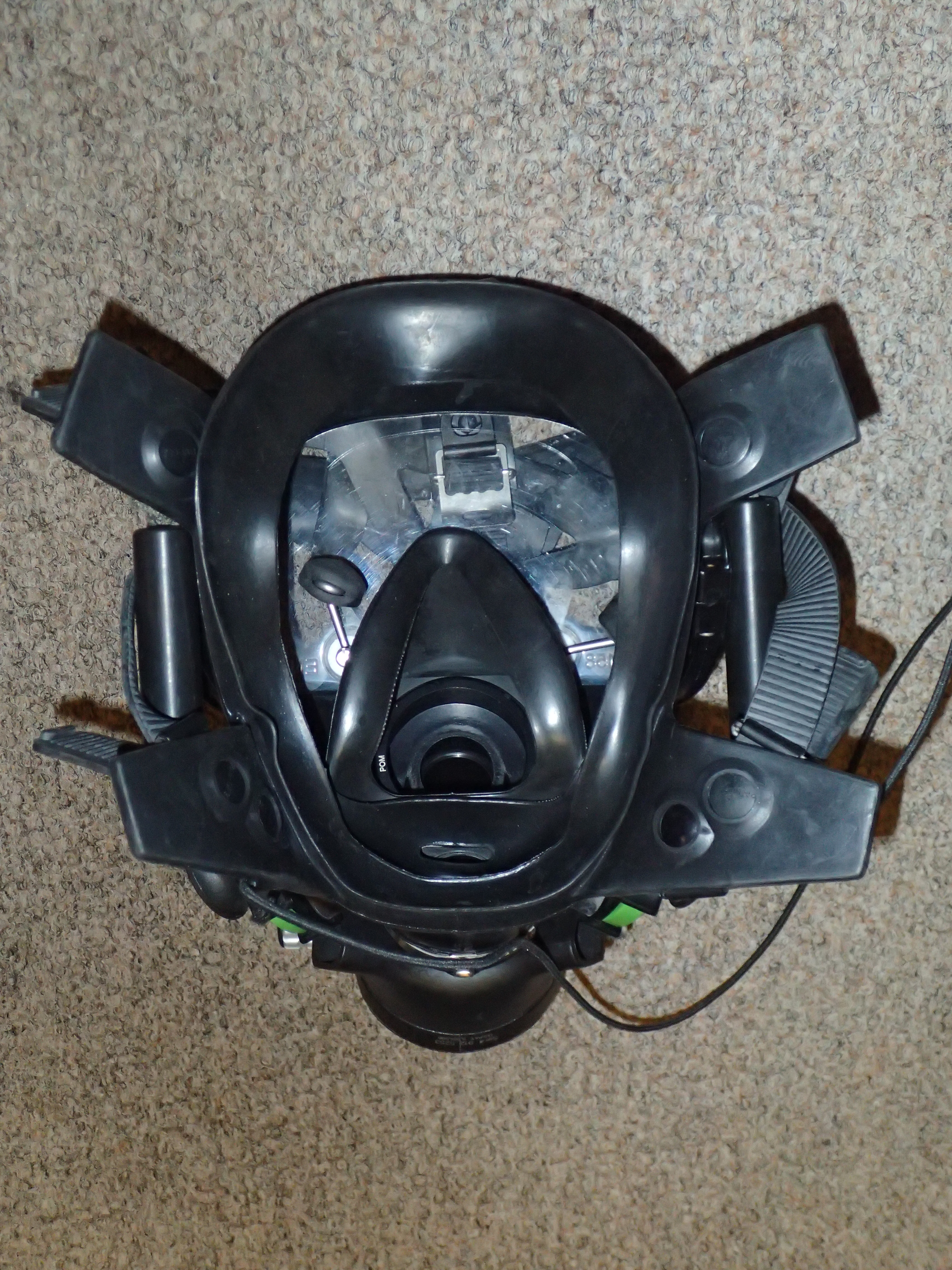
Orinasal mask inside full-face diving mask

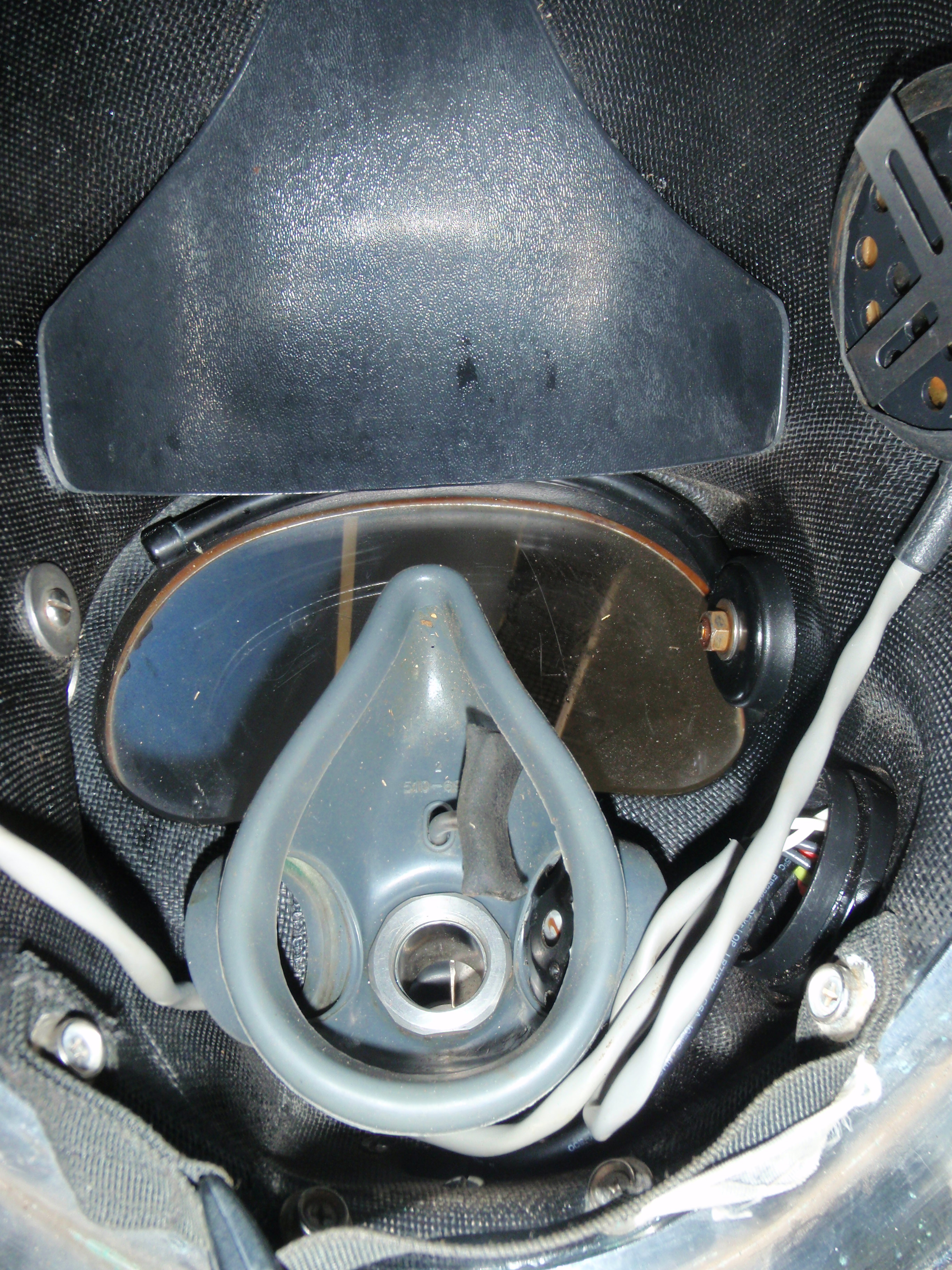
Orinasal mask inside a KM37 diving helmet

== Construction ==
The construction of an orinasal mask depends on the application. In the most basic cases a disposable mask may be made of porous paper or non-woven fabric held in place by two elasticated webbing straps around the back of the head. For more critical applications and where re-use is intended, soft flexible polymers or elastomers are generally used for the seal. The straps may be synthetic rubber or elasticated woven webbing, and the frame may be moulded plastic, to which accessories such as filters and valves can be fitted. Orinasal masks which are fitted inside full-face masks or helmets are generally made of synthetic elastomers, commonly silicone rubber, and are often a replaceable item.

== See also ==
- Dead space (physiology) – Inhaled air not part of gas exchange
