= Automated breathing metabolic simulator =

An Automated Breathing Metabolic Simulator (ABMS) is a mechanical device that replicates human breathing and metabolic processes. It is primarily used to test and evaluate respiratory protective equipment, such as closed-circuit breathing apparatus and N95 mask respirators, by simulating realistic breathing patterns and metabolic activity.

ABMS devices serve as standardized platforms for qualification and performance testing, often conducted by government agencies or commercial organizations. In the United States, regulatory oversight and testing involving ABMS technology is managed by the National Institute for Occupational Safety and Health (NIOSH) and the National Personal Protective Technology Laboratory (NPPTL).

== Requirements ==
To simulate human respiration and metabolism, an automated breathing metabolic simulator needs to consume and produce the inputs and outputs of human respiration. These include:

- Carbon dioxide production
- Oxygen consumption
- Inhalation/exhalation pressures
- Carbon dioxide percentage
- Temperatures
- Respiratory frequencies while monitoring oxygen percentage

== History ==
Respiratory researchers have long desired an accurate method of simulating the breathing and metabolic processes of a human in a laboratory setting. Simulators have become a vital resource for research institutes, regulatory centers, testing houses, and manufacturers due to their ability to generate reproducible data without the risk of direct human exposure to a tested device. Prior to the early 1980s, accurately simulating human breathing in a controlled and repetitive manner was not possible due to the lack of technological development and human knowledge of the respiratory system.

With the first models of human respiration, basic Breathing Metabolic Simulators (BMS) were devised. These relied upon a manual pump that a technician would use to simulate human breathing. These BMS were criticized for testing inaccuracies which led to unexpected respiratory protective device risks. The first BMS was developed by the U.S. Bureau of Mines in 1973. The U.S. Bureau of Mines continued funding the development of BMS's until 1985, when funding stalled. These efforts led to a design that is currently used in parts of NIOSH-NPPTL and the U.S. Navy.

The first BMS was designed under the following guidelines:

- The simulations produced by the BMS were to be as physiologically appropriate as possible.
- The construction was to employ low cost methods using standard, commercially available items wherever possible.
- Operation was to be simple and easily learned. Complex computer programs were to be avoided.
- The BMS was to be capable of manual as well as automatic operation. All data inputs into the computer were to be paralleled with analog outputs suitable for general purpose laboratory recorders.

Current manufacturers of BMS's include: CSE, Dräger, and Ocenco.

=== Automation ===
Automated simulators use the same mechanical principles as the BMS, updated with electronic components, thus offering more accurate control. The first ABMS contained three modules designed to be able to function independently from each other or work as a unit: a Breathing Simulator Module, a Gas Analysis Module, and a Supervisory Controller.

The first automated breathing simulator concepts used a bellows design. After numerous prototypes, bellows were found to be inconsistent in generating precision volumes of human breathing. Subsequently, bellows were replaced with a rigid piston design. The rigid piston solved the problem of repeatability and proved that controlled breathing waveforms were possible, subject to the precision of motor drivers.

Oxygen consumption has been simulated through various methods over the history of BMS development. Older methods of oxygen consumption include catalytic conversion, which produces hydrogen. This method saw limited use. ABMS manufacturers eventually began to prefer to remove a mixture of the breathing media, analyze the sample for the oxygen content, and then adjust the flow to contain the correct number of liters required for the correct oxygen consumption rate. At various points in the breathing cycle, CO_{2} represents a small percentage of the gas mix withdrawn to "consume" oxygen. This gas is generally analyzed separately and then algorithmically re-injected to compensate for artifacts of measurement.

BMS's utilized rotameters in the 1970s and 1980s to simulate oxygen consumption. These tools were used to replicate the changing percentage of gases in the mixture being withdrawn to accomplish oxygen consumption. When the gasses were withdrawn, nitrogen would be reintroduced into the mix. This method proved inaccurate due to requiring immediate calculations by human operators to manually alter gas flow rates. In newer ABMS designs, the job of rotameters has been left to mass flow controllers. Now, mass flow controllers, in conjunction with high speed gas analyzers, provide continuous updates and inputs into the algorithm to calculate oxygen consumption through a range of gas mixtures.

Past BMS designs also utilized paper strip chart recorders to preserve a record of data. This required days of analysis to have data in a usable format. Modern ABMS's work digitally allowing for manipulation of the data through the software that is preinstalled. This change allows for the users to be able to have added functionality and better control over the operations of the ABMS.

Prior to automation, operators of the BMS's would manually implement each stage of the testing and analysis processes, often utilizing multiple machines. Automation has helped to eliminate operator errors, allowing for more precise and repeatable data collection, and enabled faster design iteration on the part of respiratory protective device manufacturers.

Current manufacturers of ABMS's include: Ocenco and ATOR LABS.

=== Relevant ISO Number ===
The industry standard for Respiratory Protective Device (RPD) manufacturing is shifting towards the ISO 16900 series. This series provides scientific procedures and guidelines on how to standardize testing of RPD performance. The standard draws on decades of empirical experimentation and requires an ABMS that is capable of precise and repeatable measurement. As of 2018, U.S. testing houses have not widely conformed with the ISO 16900 standards. ABMS that are currently being used were produced in the 1980s. Research commissioned by NIOSH has shown that NIOSH–NPPTL conformity to the ISO 16900 standards would result in a one-time cost of $13.1 million. NIOSH–NPPTL compliance with the ISO 16900 standard would lead to better quality end product for all companies that apply through the government entity.

ISO 17420 is also being developed as a standard for testing various RPD. The new standard looks at special applications for fire, escape, and special application other than fire services and escape. The last section includes the guidelines for CBRN respiratory protection devices. Ultimately, the ISO 17420 is expected to drive the prices of RPDs up due to the cost of new testing.
