= Escape breathing apparatus =

Type of portable breathing apparatus

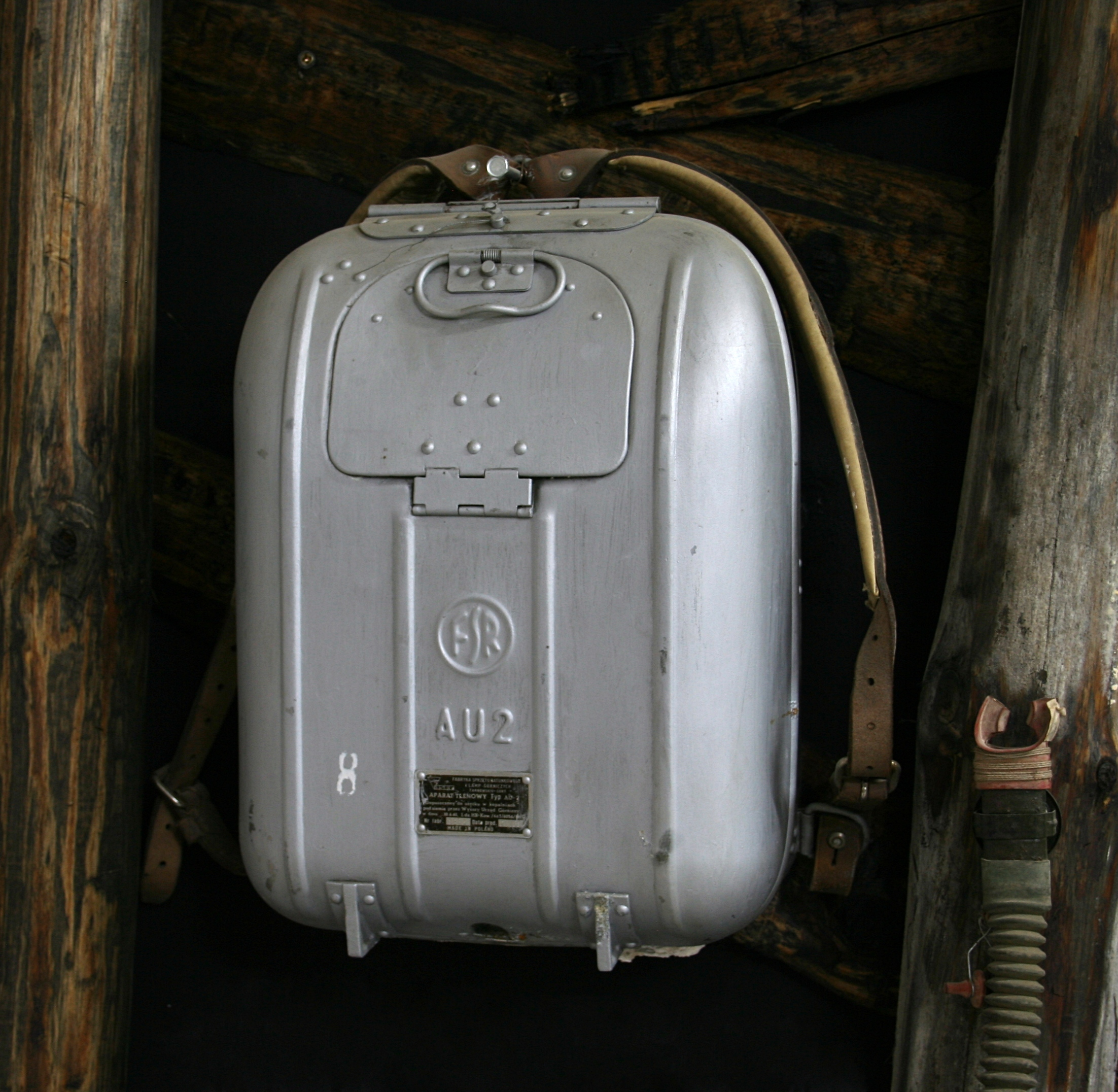
Polish Au-2 escape respirator

Escape breathing apparatus, also called escape respirators, escape sets, self-rescuer masks, emergency life saving apparatus (ELSA), emergency escape breathing devices (EEBD), and Respiratory Protective Smoke Escape Devices (RPED), are portable breathing apparatus that provide the wearer with respiratory protection for a limited period, intended for escape from or through an environment where there is no breathable ambient atmosphere. This includes escape through water and in areas containing harmful gases or fumes or other atmospheres immediately dangerous to life or health (IDLH).

Escape breathing apparatus may be air-purifying escape respirators or self-contained atmosphere-supplying escape respirators. They may use a breathing hood, facepiece or mouthpiece and nose-clip as the user respiratory interface. Atmosphere-supplying apparatus may be rebreathers with a chemical or compressed gas oxygen supply, positive pressure demand apparatus, or constant flow apparatus using high pressure compressed air. Contamination of the breathing gas may be avoided by relying on a good seal around the user respiratory interface, or by a small positive pressure relative to the surroundings.

Escape breathing apparatus are not generally intended to be used for anything other than escaping a dangerous environment. An escape-only respirator is defined as "a respirator intended to be used only for emergency exit".

== Applications ==
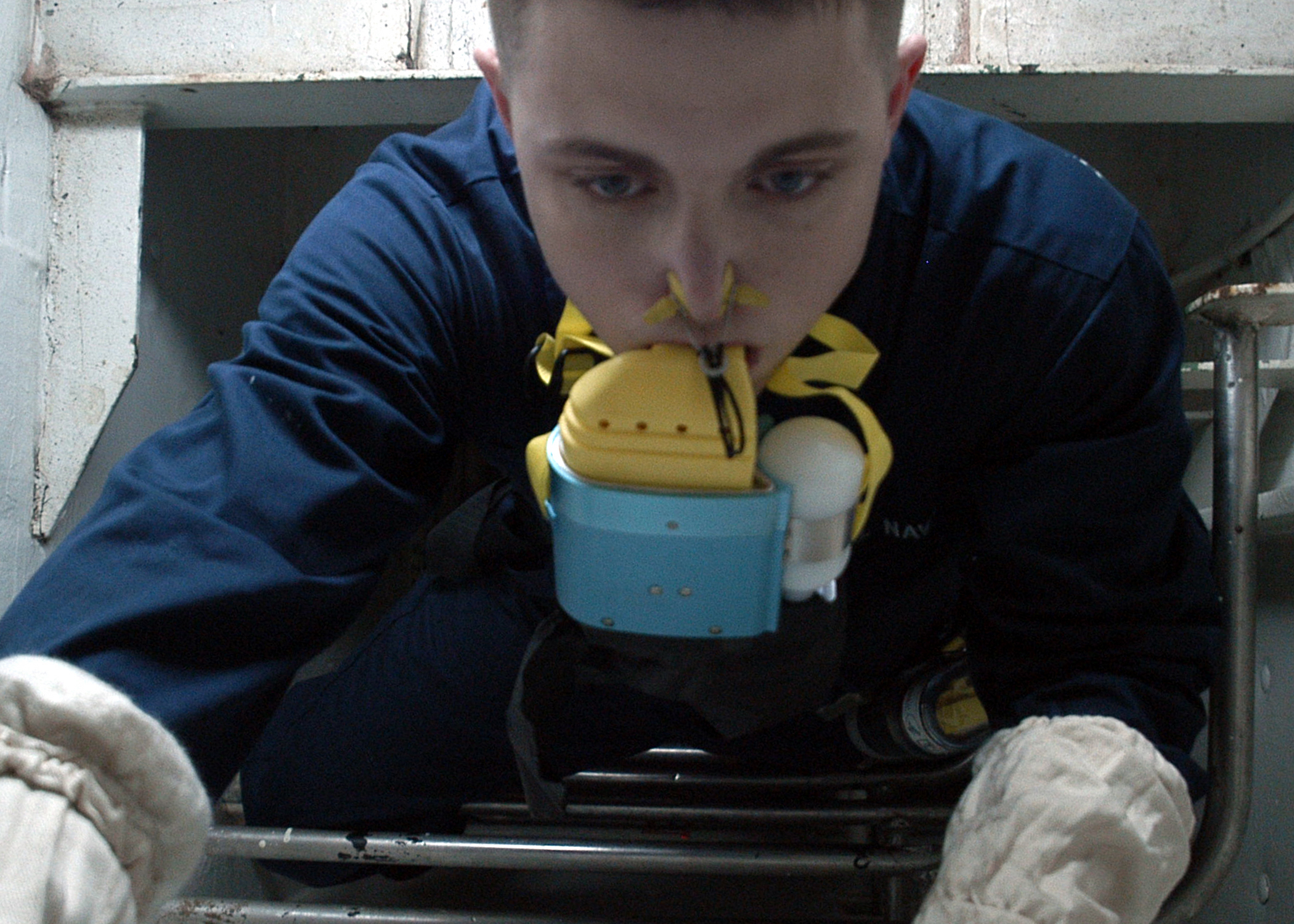
US Navy Emergency Escape Breathing Device (EEBD)

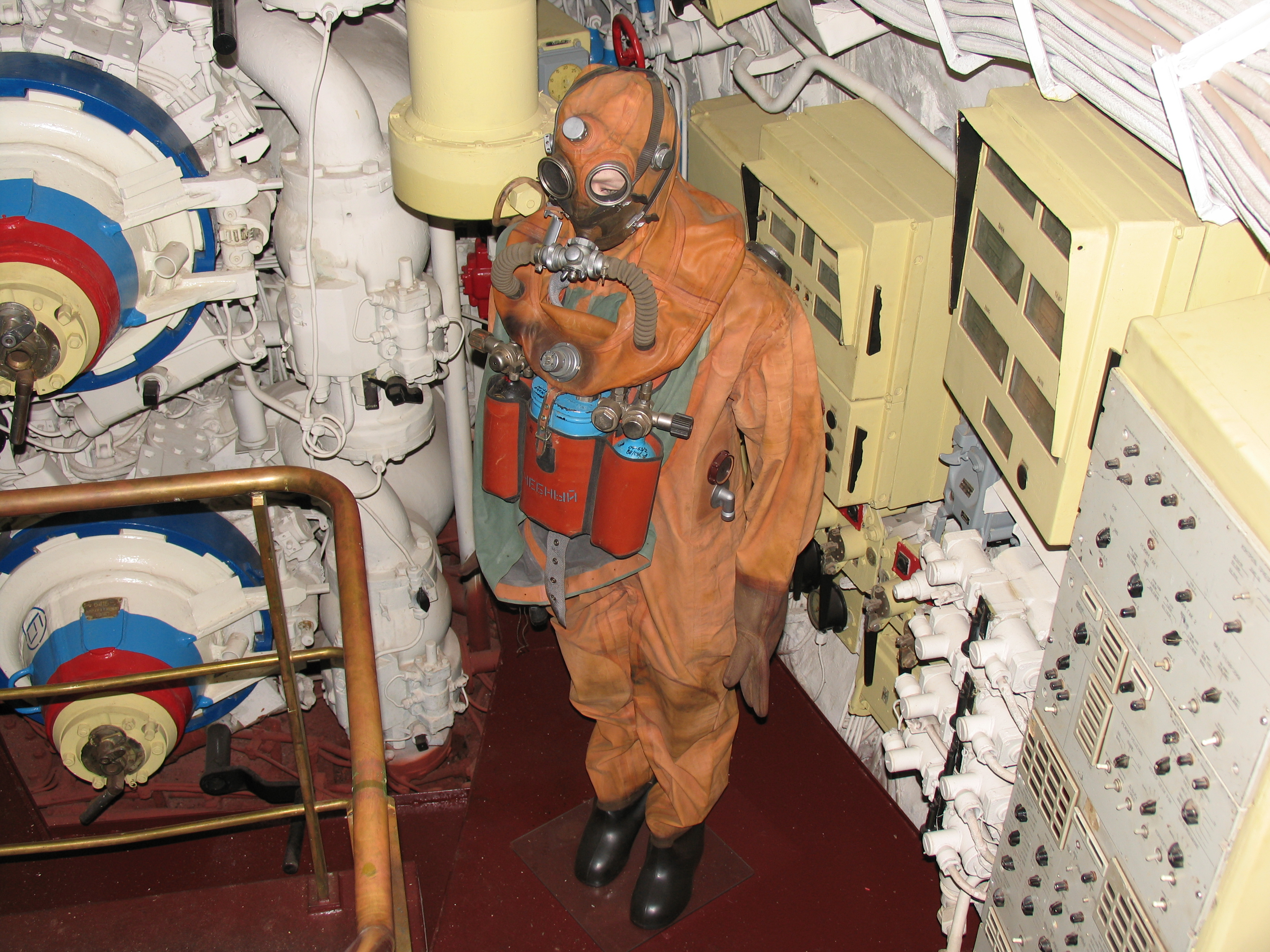
Russian submarine-escape suit including an escape rebreather.

Escape breathing apparatus are a class of self contained atmosphere supplying or air purifying breathing apparatus for use in emergencies, intended to allow the user to pass through areas without a breathable atmosphere to a place of relative safety where the ambient air is safe to breathe. These are ambient pressure systems, and include:

- Helicopter escape set
- Mine escape set
- Submarine escape set
- Amphibious Tank Escape Apparatus
- Smoke hood
- Railroad tunnels used by diesel locomotives

Early escape sets were often rebreathers and were typically used to escape from submarines that were unable to surface. Escape sets are also used ashore, in the mining industry, and by the military for escape from tanks.

The small open-circuit scuba Helicopter Aircrew Breathing Device has the similar purpose of providing breathing gas to escape from a ditched helicopter.

=== Selection ===
Escape breathing apparatus have the function of allowing a person working in an environment that is normally safe, enough time to escape from respiratory hazards that may occur without sufficient warning to evacuate without respiratory protection. Therefore, selection relies mainly on the time required to escape, and the probability of IDLH or oxygen deficiency, rather than assigned protection factors.

Calculation of the time likely to be needed for escape and the recommended escape route is the responsibility of the employer, and should take into account the reasonably foreseeable emergencies that might require escape.

An air purification type escape respirator includes a filter or absorbent cartridge suitable for the environment in which it is intended to be used. They are unsuitable for escape through potentially oxygen depleted environments. An escape respirator that provides autonomous gas will allow the user to escape most environments that require only respiratory protection. They are generally available with endurance ratings from 3 to 60 minutes. 10 and 15 minutes are common specifications. An escape respirator provides no chemical or environmental protection to the rest of the user's body, and the need for eye protection must be considered when choosing the user respiratory interface.

== Types ==
=== Autonomous breathing gas supply ===
These breathing apparatus carry a supply of breathing gas calculated to be sufficient for most users to escape within the specified time-frame.

==== Rebreathers ====
Atmospheric air contains about 21% oxygen. In normal breathing the body uses about 4% and replaces it with carbon dioxide. A volume of air can be breathed several times before its oxygen content is exhausted, but carbon dioxide accumulates as the oxygen is used up, and causes discomfort and respiratory distress, so it must be removed from the breathing cycle. There is also a danger that when the oxygen level is too low, the user will lose consciousness due to hypoxia, and may asphyxiate, so oxygen must be provided to compensate for use.

The absorbent used for non-regenerative carbon dioxide absorption is usually sodalime, or a material based on sodalime, but in former times slaked lime or quicklime or caustic soda was sometimes used.

Rebreathers using chemical oxygen generation can be small, light and easy to wear. They may use the pendulum type breathing system, which has larger dead space than a one-way loop architecture, but is simpler and cheaper to manufacture. Endurance is generally from 20 to 100 minutes Oxygen is produced by a chemical reaction between the carbon dioxide and potassium superoxide absorbent, which both removes the carbon dioxide and supplies a slightly larger volume of oxygen to replace that which was used.

A basic unit may use a bite-grip mouthpiece and nose clip, or may include goggles or a hood if eye protection is necessary. Some units have a cartridge to inflate the bag when first used, but this is mainly to provide a bit more volume in the counterlung, which can reduce the feeling of insufficient gas at startup when the bag is nearly empty.

These sets can offer a relatively long endurance, and may be classed as working breathing apparatus as well, in which case they may be worn to carry out a task, unlike most escape sets which are for escape only. The endurance times are affected by exertion. Harder work increases oxygen usage and carbon dioxide production, both of which use up the chemicals in the scrubber. The gas delivered can be fairly hot and may be uncomfortable to breathe in a hot environment. The sets are usually made for one use only so activation for false alarms or misuse can be costly. Some users may have a gag reflex from the mouthpiece. Potassium superoxide is violently reactive in contact with water, and could be dangerous for escape sets which may leak while immersed.

Oxygen rebreathers can also use less reactive scrubber absorbent which only removes carbon dioxide, but must then have an alternative supply of oxygen, usually compressed gas from a high pressure cylinder.

Submarine escape sets had a mouthpiece, so the user had to also wear a noseclip to prevent breathing water through the nose. The endurance of a submarine escape set was between 15 and 45 minutes.

==== Open circuit escape breathing apparatus ====
Open circuit escape breathing apparatus may be demand supplied or constant flow.

A positive pressure open circuit breathing apparatus with a full-face mask provides the highest level of protection against a toxic environment, but is relatively complex, expensive, and requires greater competence to use efficiently. They provide breathing air from a high pressure cylinder carried by the user, supplied through a pressure reducing regulator and a demand valve, to a mask which covers the whole face, and must fit correctly to prevent gas wastage via leaks. The air is provided at a pressure slightly above ambient to ensure that any leaks are outwards. Recharging is simple and inexpensive. Vision through the mask is usually quite good, and voice communication is usually acceptable. Endurance depends on cylinder size and working pressure, effectiveness of the face seal, and level of exertion and anxiety of the user. 10 to 15 minutes is typical, though more is possible.

There may be difficulties with sealing over facial hair, and wearing over eyeglasses. More skill is needed to safely and effectively use this type of breathing apparatus, mainly due to the need to fit the mask correctly.

Constant flow open circuit breathing apparatus delivers compressed air from a storage cylinder at about 40 litres per minute, regardless of the activity of the user. This makes the endurance accurately predictable and dependent on the cylinder volume and charging pressure. Since they are commonly provided with a hood and seal on the neck, they are tolerant of facial hair and eyeglasses, but the large hood volume and soft plastic viewport do not provide very good vision, as it can wrinkle and crease, and it is possible to exercise hard enough to need more air than the regulator will provide. Voice communication is hindered by the soft hood fabric and the constant noise of the gas flowing into the hood.

The air supply is typically from a 200 bar aluminium, steel or fibre-wound composite cylinder. A 2-litre cylinder will supply roughly 10 minutes endurance, and a 3-litre cylinder about 15 minutes at 35 to 37 litres per minute. A rubber neck seal helps provide a positive pressure within the hood. The total mass of a set, complete with sling carrying bag is typically in the order of 5 to 7 kg.

=== Continuous-flow Escape-SCBA ===
A continuous-flow self-contained breathing apparatus (SCBA), usually with hood, is a type of emergency escape breathing apparatus.

== Certification ==
Escape respirators should be certified by a national authority analogous to the United States' National Institute for Occupational Safety and Health (NIOSH) for use in the atmosphere types for which the respirator is intended. Some standards apply to the level of protection for the user, and others relate to the intrinsic safety of the equipment for use in flammable and potentially explosive atmospheres. Some standards are voluntary, going above the minimum requirements of a national authority such as NIOSH. Conformance with voluntary standards may be shown through third-party product certification such as those issued by the Safety Equipment Institute (SEI).

Depending on the industry in which they are used, escape respirators may have to comply with, or be approved in terms of, one or more of:

- ASTM E2952-23 — Standard Specification for Air-Purifying Respiratory Protective Smoke Escape Devices (RPED)
- NFPA 1981-19 — Standard on Open-Circuit Self-Contained Breathing Apparatus (SCBA) for Emergency Services
- NFPA 1984-22 — Standard on Respirators for Wildland Fire-Fighting and Wildland Urban Interface Operations
- NFPA 1986-23 — Standard on Respiratory Protection Equipment for Tactical and Technical Operations
- NFPA 1987-23 — Standard on Combination Unit Respirator Systems for Tactical and Technical Operations
- EN 402:2003 — Respiratory protective devices - Lung governed demand Self-contained open-circuit compressed air breathing apparatus with full face mask or mouthpiece assembly for escape.
- ISO 23269-1:2008 — Ships and marine technology — Breathing apparatus for ships — Part 1: Emergency escape breathing devices (EEBD) for shipboard use.
- ISO 23269-4:2011
- EN 1127-1:2011 — Explosive atmospheres - Explosion prevention and protection - Part 1: Basic concepts and methodology
- EN1146:2005
- EN 13463-1:2009 — Non-electrical equipment for use in potentially explosive atmospheres – Part 1: Basic method and requirements
- IEC/TS 60079-32-1:2013 — Explosive atmospheres – Part 32-1: Electrostatic hazards, guidance
- SOLAS Chapter II-2, the Marine Equipment Directive and the Pressure Equipment Directive.

== History ==
Development of the first militarily useful submarines before the First World War raised the question about rescue and escape if the submarine was unable to surface. Robert Henry Davis and Henry A. Fleuss developed a rebreather, which was useful in the mining industry and under water.

One example is the Davis Submerged Escape Apparatus. Escape sets were also used ashore, e.g. in the mining industry, and for escape from tanks (Amphibious Tank Escape Apparatus).

- 1903: Siebe Gorman started to make this breathing set in England; in the years afterwards it was improved, and later was called the Davis Submerged Escape Apparatus.
- 1905: An important innovation: metering valves to control the supply of oxygen. This was promptly adopted by other companies which made escape sets.
- 1907: Draeger of Lübeck invented the U-Boot-Retter = "submarine rescuer".

Both systems were based on oxygen supply from a high-pressure cylinder with simultaneous absorption of carbon dioxide by an inserted cartridge filled with sodium hydroxide.

- 1916: The Draeger model DM 2 became standard equipment of the German Navy.
- 1926: Draeger displayed a rescue breathing apparatus that the wearer could swim with. While the previous devices served only for ascending to the surface and were designed also to develop buoyancy so that the wearer arrived at the surface without swimming movements, the diving set had weights, which also made it possible to dive down with it, to search and rescue after an accident.
- 1939: Hans Hass developed from the escape set a type of rebreather with its bag on his back and two breathing tubes but no backpack box. These sets appear much in his movies and books.

=== In popular media ===
Escape sets are used in these films:

- Das Boot (Johann das Gespenst stops water from breaking in under a diesel engine)
- Haie und kleine Fische (controlled exit from a sunk submarine)
- In Enemy Hands (To survive a prolonged submersion while under attack by a destroyer)

== See also ==
- Davis Submerged Escape Apparatus – Oxygen rebreather
- Smoke hood – Device to protect the user from smoke inhalation in an emergency
- Submarine Escape Immersion Equipment – Whole-body exposure suit that allows submariners to escape from a sunken submarine
