= Half-mask =

A half-mask is a mask that covers half the face. It may mean:

- a mask covering from below the eyes to below the chin
  - a dust mask
  - a filtering facepiece respirator
  - an elastomeric respirator
- a mask covering the eyes and perhaps the forehead and/or nose, but not the mouth.
  - a half-face diving mask
