= Underwater breathing apparatus =

Equipment which provides breathing gas to an underwater diver

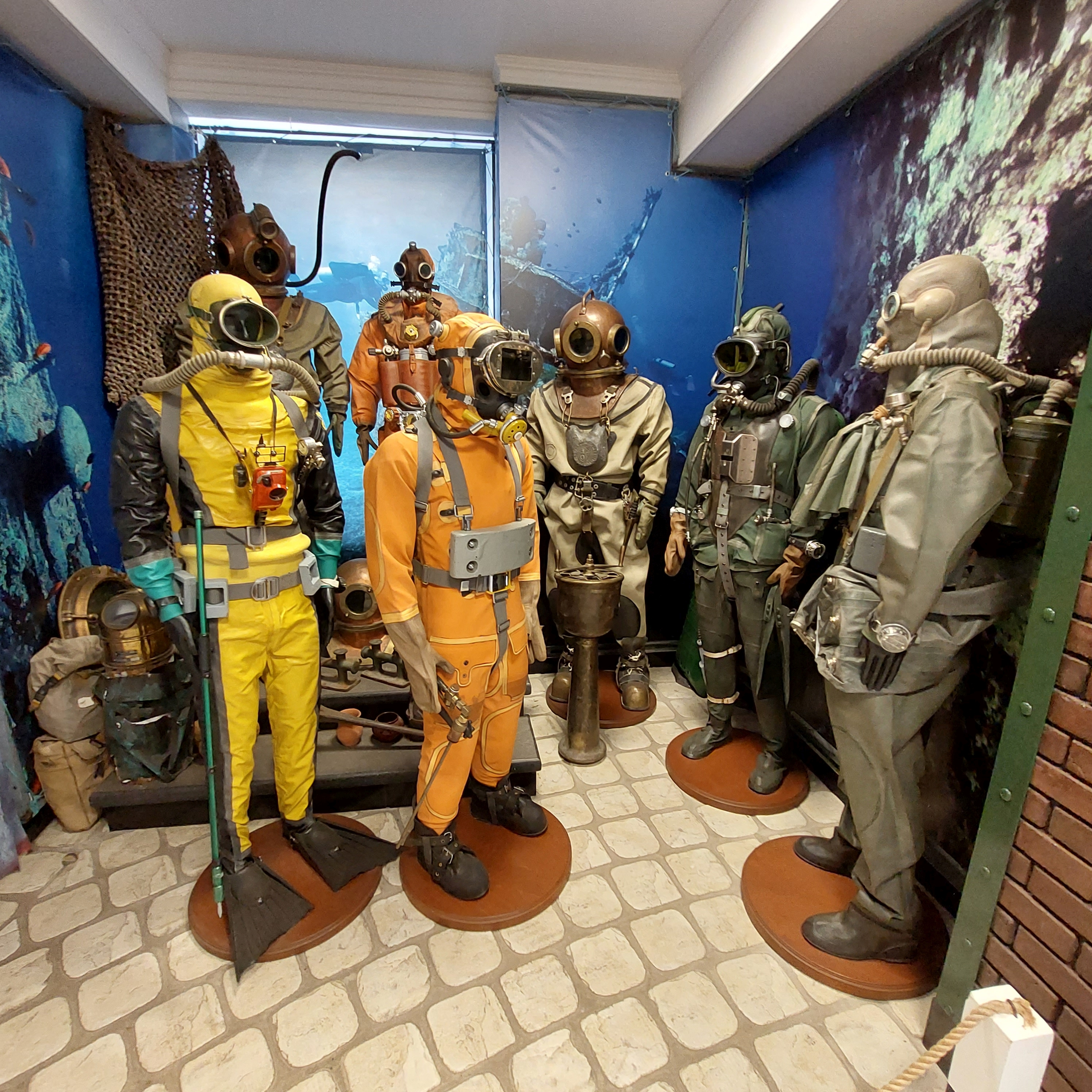
- A museum display of a variety of different underwater breathing apparatus configurations
- Acronym: UBA
- Uses: provision of breathing gas to an underwater diver
- Related items: Breathing apparatus, diving equipment, life-support equipment

Underwater breathing apparatus is equipment which allows the user to breathe underwater. The three major categories of ambient pressure underwater breathing apparatus are:

- Open circuit scuba, where the diver carries the gas supply, and exhaled gas is exhausted to the environment
- Diving rebreather, where the diver carries the gas supply, and exhaled gas is recycled for further use, and
- Surface-supplied diving equipment, where the gas supply is provided from the surface through a hose, usually in a diver's umbilical, but also sometimes from a simple air hose.

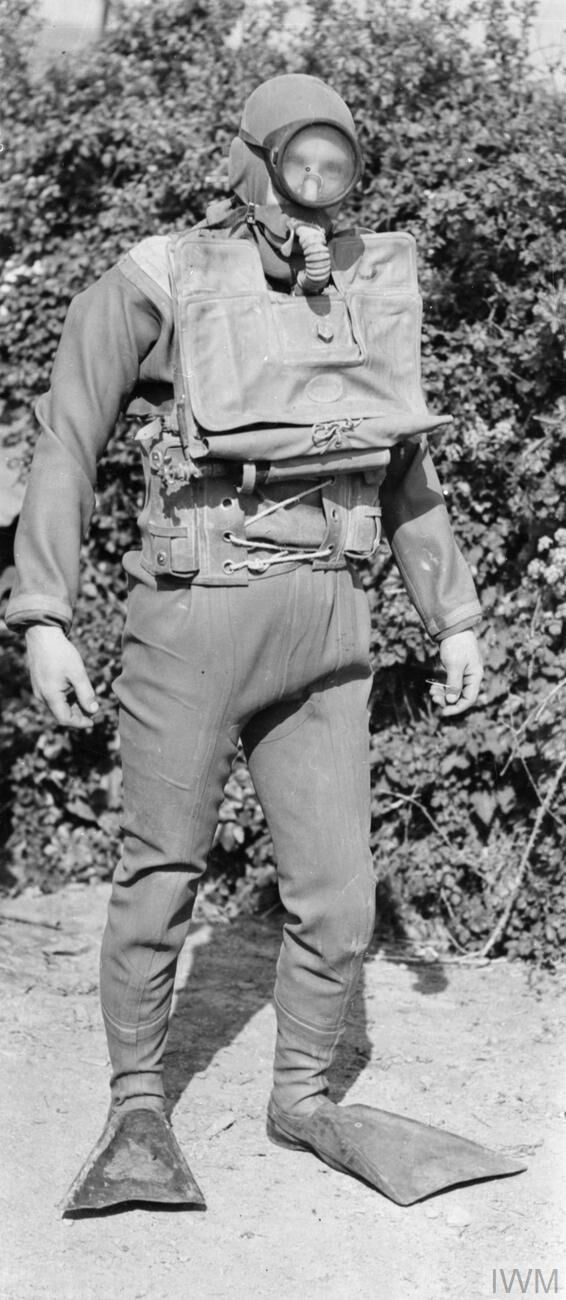
Royal Navy commando in 1945. Note his breathing apparatus

Two other types may also be identified:

- Escape sets provide a limited amount of breathing gas to allow the user to reach the surface from a disabled vessel or vehicle.
- Atmospheric pressure underwater breathing apparatus is also used in the form of armoured atmospheric diving suits, which maintain an internal pressure approximating surface pressure.

== Classification ==
Underwater breathing apparatus can be classified as open circuit, semi-closed circuit, (including gas extenders) or closed circuit (including reclaim systems), based on whether any of the exhaled gas is recycled, and as self-contained or remotely supplied (usually surface-supplied, but also possibly from a lock-out submersible or an underwater habitat), depending on where the source of the primary breathing gas is located. It may also be classified as ambient pressure or atmospheric pressure systems, and by purpose, between diving equipment and escape equipment.

== Open circuit scuba ==
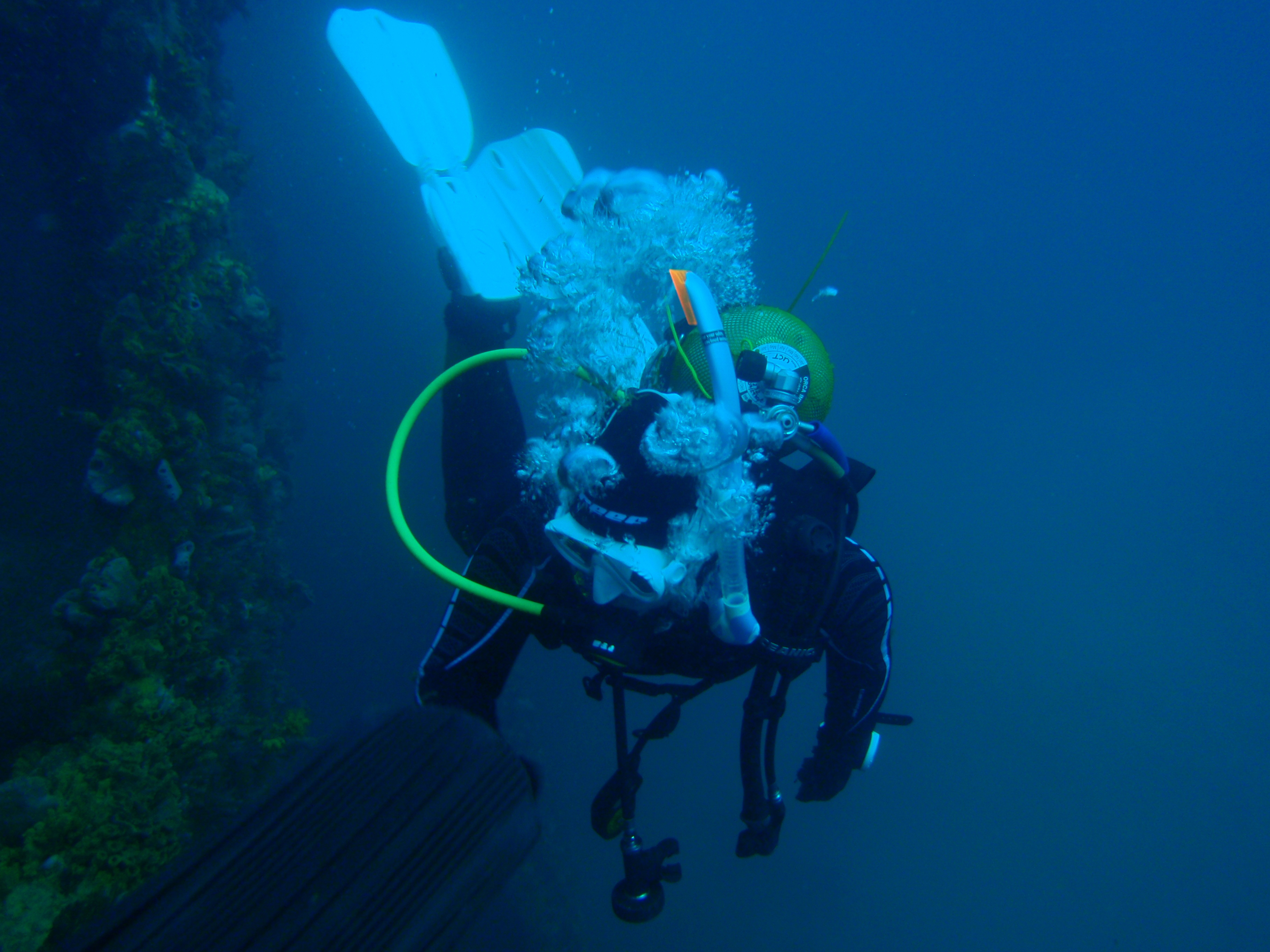
Recreational scuba diver

A scuba set is any self-contained breathing apparatus that is carried entirely by an underwater diver and provides the diver with breathing gas at the ambient pressure. Although strictly speaking the scuba set is only the diving equipment which is required for providing breathing gas to the diver, general usage includes the harness by which it is carried, and those accessories which are integral parts of the harness and breathing apparatus assembly, such as a jacket or wing style buoyancy compensator and instruments mounted in a combined housing with the pressure gauge. In open-circuit demand scuba, the diver expels exhaled air to the environment, and requires each breath be delivered on demand by a diving regulator, which reduces the pressure from the storage cylinder. The breathing air is supplied through a demand valve when the diver reduces the pressure in the demand valve during inhalation.

== Rebreather scuba ==
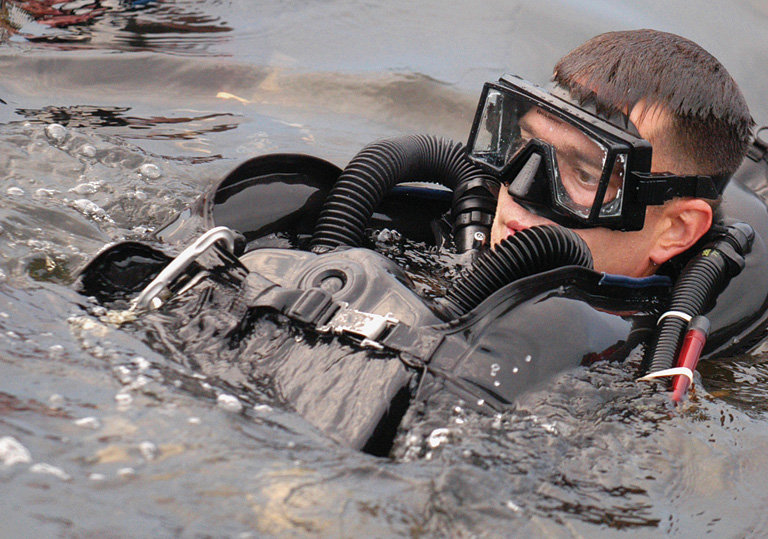
2nd Reconnaissance Battalion combat diver training with the Draeger LAR V rebreather

A diving rebreather recirculates the breathing gas already used by the diver after replacing oxygen used by the diver and removing the carbon dioxide metabolic product. Rebreather diving is used by recreational, military and scientific divers in applications where it has advantages over open circuit scuba, and surface supply of breathing gas is impracticable. The main advantages of rebreather diving are extended gas endurance, and lack of bubbles. Rebreathers are generally used for scuba applications, but are also occasionally used for bailout systems for surface supplied diving. Rebreathers are more complex to use than open circuit scuba, and have more potential points of failure, so acceptably safe use requires a greater level of skill, attention and situational awareness, which is usually derived from understanding the systems, diligent maintenance and overlearning the practical skills of operation and fault recovery.

== Surface-supplied diving equipment ==
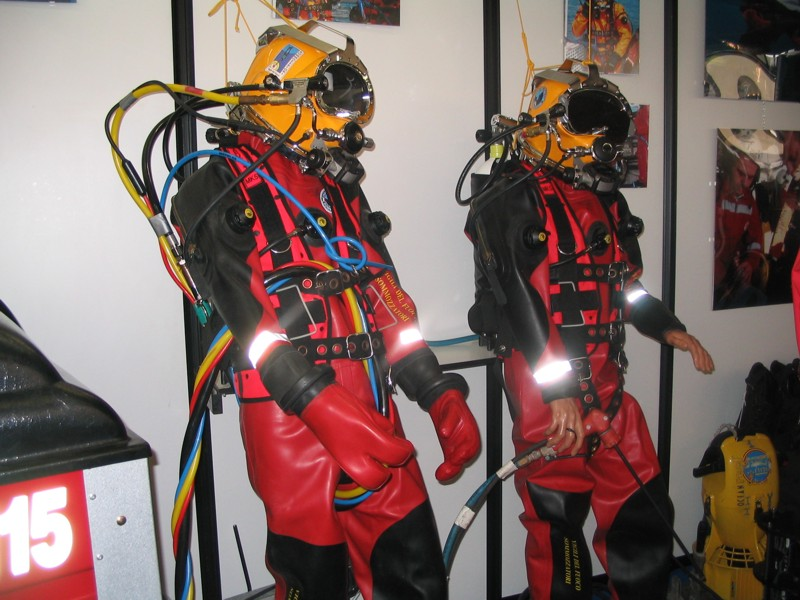
Surface- supplied commercial diving equipment on display at a trade show

The essential aspect of surface-supplied diving is that breathing gas is supplied from the surface, either from a specialized diving compressor, high-pressure cylinders, or both. In commercial and military surface-supplied diving, a backup source of breathing gas is generally required, by regulatory legislation of code of practice, to be present in case the primary supply fails. The diver may also wear an emergency gas supply cylinder called a "bail-out bottle," which can provide self-contained breathing gas in an emergency. The surface-supplied diver is much less likely to have an "out-of-air" emergency than a scuba diver as there are normally two alternative breathing gas sources available. Surface-supplied diving equipment usually includes communication capability with the surface, which improves the safety and efficiency of the working diver.

Surface-supplied diving includes diving using an umbilical with gas supply hose, lifeline strength member and communications cable, using a helmet or full-face mask, and diving with a simple air line, also known as hookah equipment., though regulatory legislation may in some jurisdictions exclude air line equipment from their definition.

=== Open and closed circuit systems ===
Surface-supplied air is provided on an open-circuit system, as it is simpler and more economical than recycling, and when supplied from the ambient atmosphere by a low pressure compressor, is practically unlimited.

For gas mixtures based on helium, the cost of the helium for open circuit use is a significant part of the operational costs, and helium can be difficult to source as well as expensive, so methods to extend the use of the helium diluent by a semi-closed circuit system or reclaim exhaled helium mixtures from the divers and recycle the gas at the surface by a closed circuit system have been developed to reduce waste.

== Escape sets ==
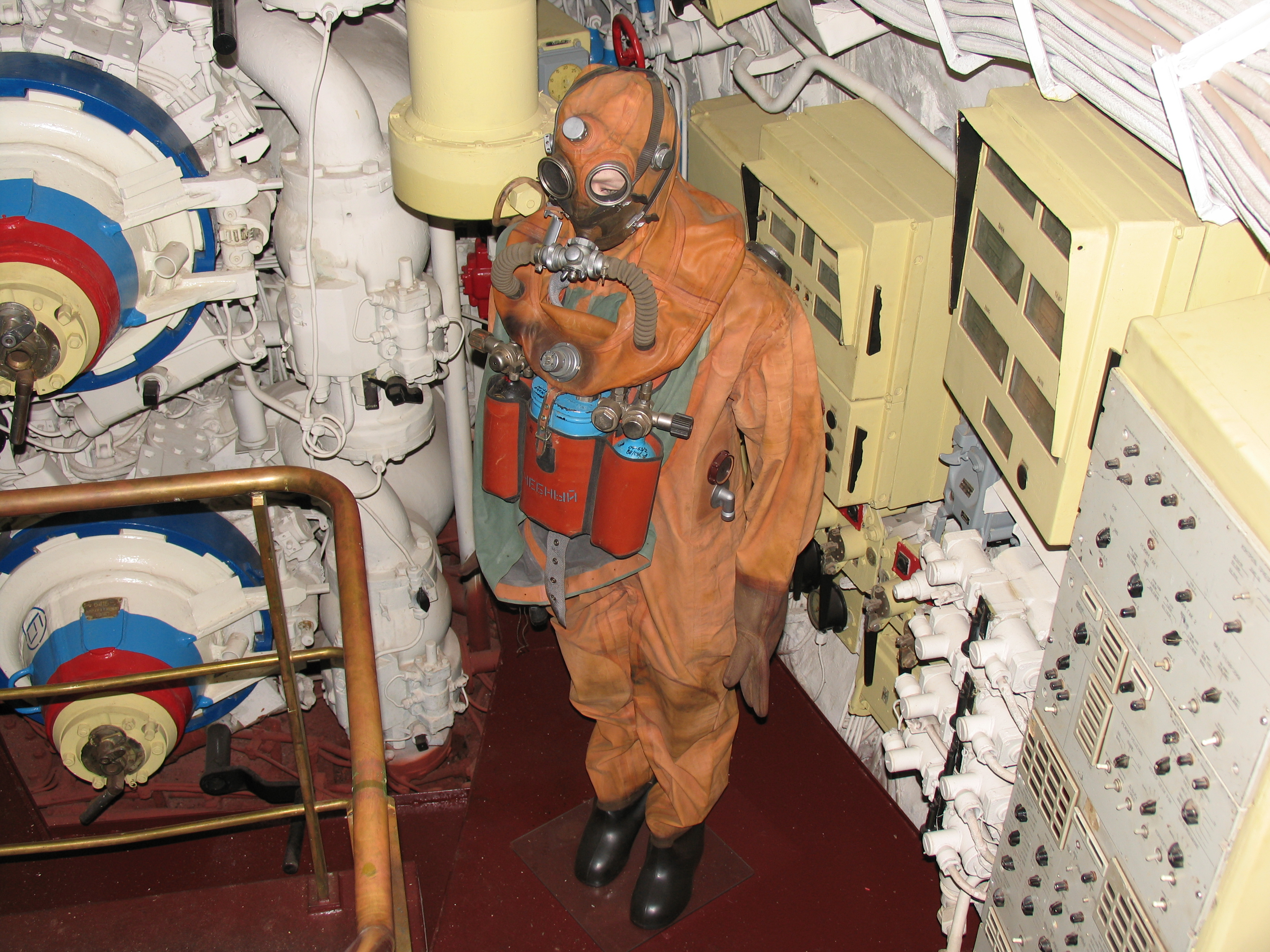
Russian submarine-escape suit including an escape rebreather.

An escape set is a self-contained breathing apparatus that allows its wearer to survive for a time in an environment without breathable air, which would allow escape through water to the surface. Early escape sets were rebreathers and were typically intended for escape from disabled submarines that were unable to surface. Escape sets are also used ashore, e.g. in the mining industry, and for escape from tanks (Amphibious Tank Escape Apparatus). The small open-circuit scuba Helicopter Aircrew Breathing Device has the similar purpose of providing breathing gas to escape from a ditched helicopter. A diver's bailout set has a similar function, and is used to escape from an underwater situation where the primary breathing apparatus has failed for any reason.

An escape set or bailout set should provide sufficient suitable breathing gas for the user to safely reach a place where an adequate further breathing gas supply is available, allowing for any necessary decompression.

== Atmospheric diving suits ==
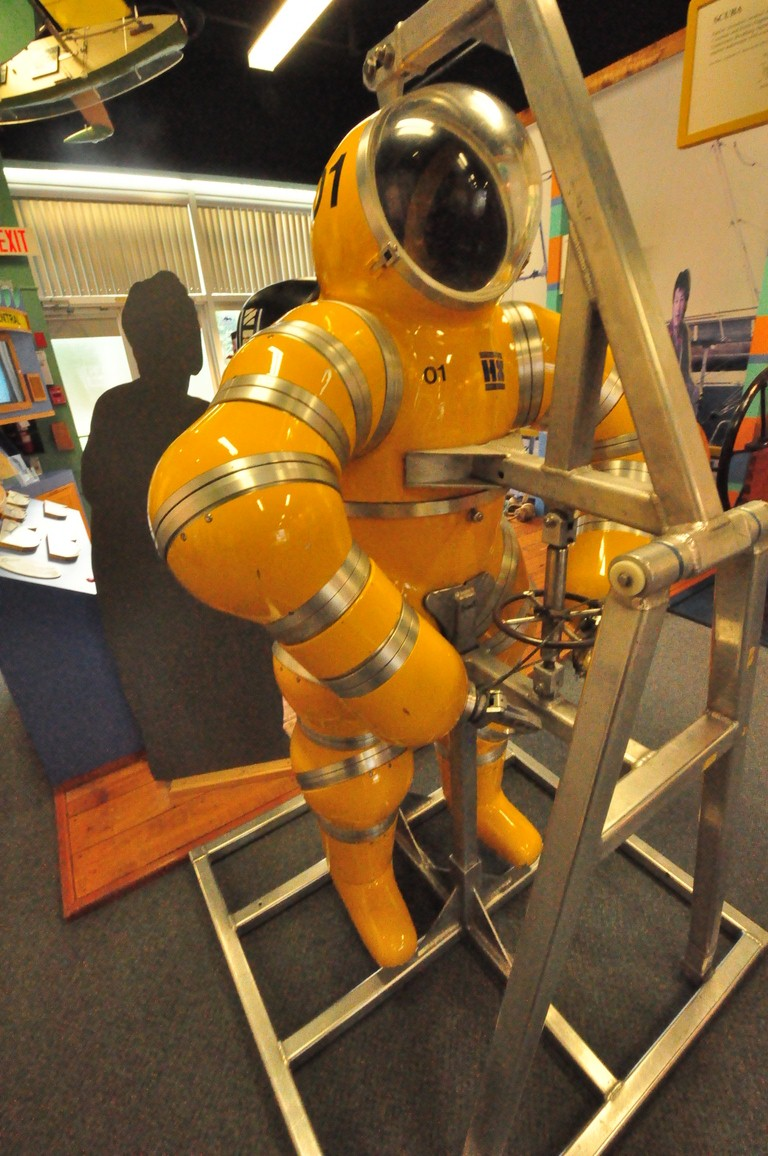
The Newtsuit has fully articulated, rotary joints in the arms and legs. These provide great mobility, while remaining largely unaffected by high pressures.

An atmospheric diving suit (ADS) is a small one-person articulated anthropomorphic submersible which resembles a suit of armour, with elaborate pressure joints to allow articulation while maintaining an internal pressure of one atmosphere. Atmospheric diving suits can be used for very deep dives of up to 2,300 feet (700 m) for many hours, and eliminate the majority of significant physiological dangers associated with deep diving; the occupant need not decompress, there is no need for special gas mixtures, nor is there danger of decompression sickness or nitrogen narcosis. Divers do not even need to be skilled swimmers as it is not possible to swim in these suits.

Current atmospheric suits use closed circuit breathing gas systems, because it would be necessary to vent open circuit gas to the surface through a low pressure hose or pump the gas out to the water at ambient pressure, and to provide a system to prevent high-pressure flooding in the event of an umbilical rupture. A simple atmospheric pressure closed circuit oxygen rebreather system avoids these complications.

== See also ==
- Breathing apparatus – Equipment allowing or assisting the user to breathe in a hostile environment
- Human factors in diving equipment design#Breathing apparatus – Influence of the interaction between the user and the equipment on design
- Life-support equipment – Equipment which is necessary to support life in a hostile environment
- Underwater diving equipment – Equipment used to facilitate underwater diving
