= Smoke hood =

Device to protect the user from smoke inhalation in an emergency

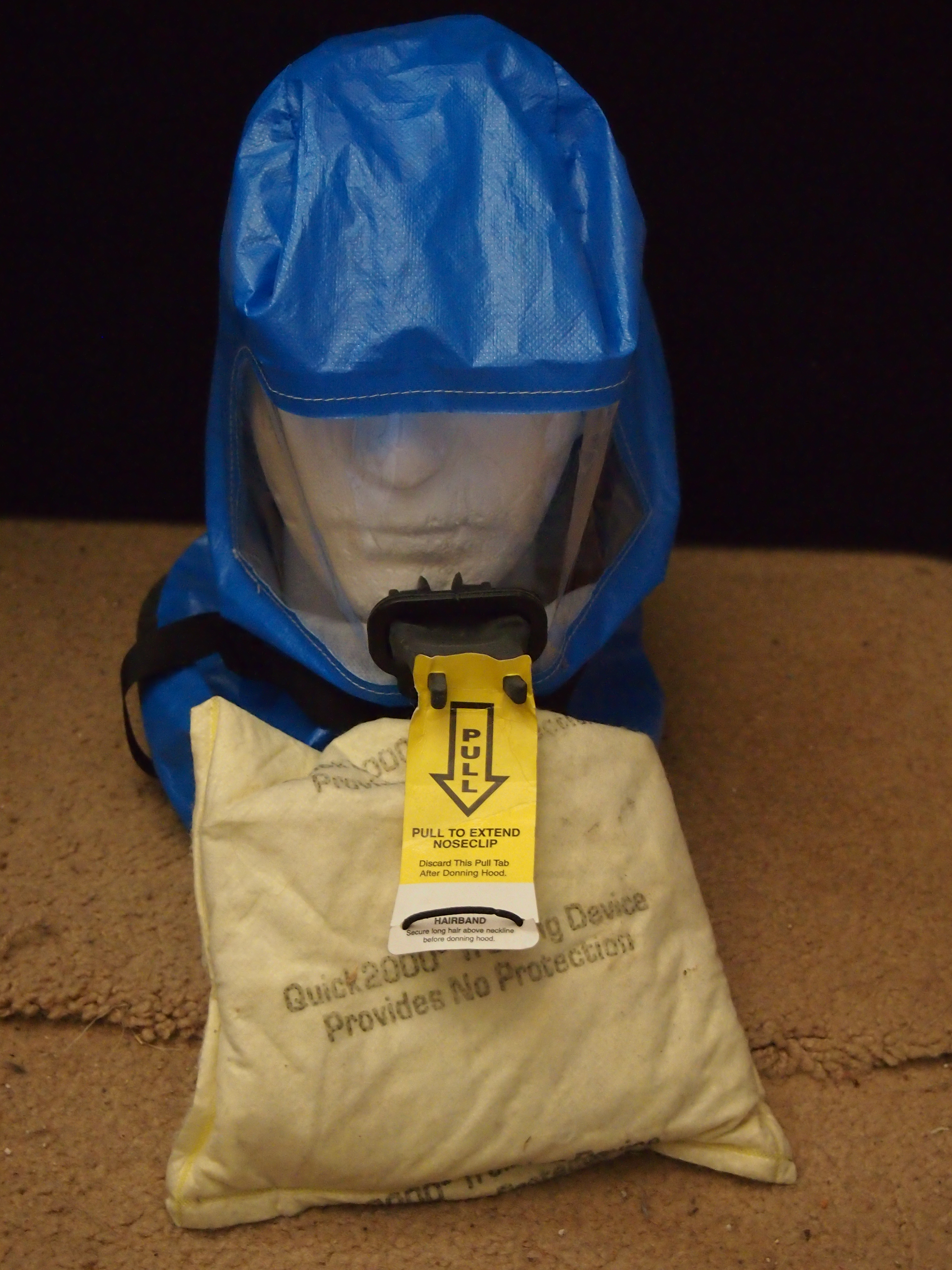
- Smoke hood training model
- [edit on Wikidata]

A smoke hood, also called an Air-Purifying Respiratory Protective Smoke Escape Device (RPED), is a hood wherein a transparent airtight bag seals around the head of the wearer while an air filter held in the mouth connects to the outside atmosphere and is used to breathe. Smoke hoods are a class of emergency breathing apparatus intended to protect victims of fire from the effects of smoke inhalation. A smoke hood is a predecessor to the gas mask. The first modern smoke hood design was by Garrett Morgan and patented in 1912.

== History ==
Although the concept of air filtration masks dates back as far as Pliny the Elder, many early designs suffered from serious flaws, including an inability to adequately filter or provide enough air to the user, or design shortcomings that led to equipment that was either uncomfortable or difficult to don and use.

The first known modern-design smoke hood was developed by Garrett Morgan and was patented in 1912. The Morgan hood represented a significant improvement in the engineering and operability of smoke hoods or masks. Due partly to race issues in the United States at the time, Morgan, an African American, and his device went largely unrecognized until 1916. During construction of a tunnel under Lake Erie, an explosion trapped a number of sandhogs in the partially completed tunnel and filled the space with toxic fumes. Two separate rescue attempts failed, and the rescue teams themselves ended up in need of rescuing. Morgan, along with his brother and two volunteers, entered wearing Morgan smoke hoods and rescued several men apiece, which prompted others to don Morgan hoods and join the rescue attempt. In the end, Morgan's smoke hood enabled the rescue of many of the previous rescuers and allowed Morgan himself to make four trips into the tunnel—a journey that, without the hood, was not possible even once.

== Modern hoods ==
High-quality smoke hoods are generally constructed of heat-resistant material like Kapton, and can withstand relatively high temperatures. The most important part of a smoke hood is the filter that provides protection from the toxic byproducts of combustion. Virtually all smoke hood designs utilize some form of activated charcoal filter and particulate filter to screen out corrosive fumes like ammonia and chlorine, as well as acid gases like hydrogen chloride and hydrogen sulfide. The defining characteristic of an effective smoke hood is the ability to convert deadly carbon monoxide to relatively harmless carbon dioxide through a catalytic process.

They are included in preparedness kits, after the September 11 attacks. Preparedness lists, such as those presented by Ready.Gov, often recommend smoke hoods, although some lists use alternate names such as "fume hoods," "respirator hoods," or "self-rescue hoods." As most modern construction contains materials that produce toxic smoke or fumes when burned, smoke hoods can allow people to make a safe escape from buildings when it might not otherwise be possible.

=== Positive-pressure hoods ===
Smoke hoods present on aircraft, also called protective breathing equipment (or PBEs), typically generate oxygen for anywhere from 30 seconds to 15 minutes. The oxygen is kept in a closed circuit, usually thanks to a tight neck seal. A scrubber system may be present to reduce the levels of carbon dioxide, and is breathable for around 20 minutes. When the oxygen supply ends, the hood will begin deflating and must be removed to avoid suffocation. These devices represent a subgroup of smoke hoods called positive-pressure respirators, which prevent the ingress of smoke or toxic gases by maintaining a higher air pressure inside the mask than outside. Consequently, any leak will cause fresh air to leak out of the mask, rather than toxic air to leak in.

== Standards and Certification ==
In North America, respirators are required to be certified by the National Institute for Occupational Safety and Health (NIOSH). Additional voluntary consensus standards have been developed for respiratory protective devices for specific applications that go beyond the minimum governmental requirements. For smoke hoods, or RPEDs, ASTM International has developed ASTM E2952, Standard Specification for Air-Purifying Respiratory Protective Smoke Escape Devices (RPED). Conformity to voluntary standards like ASTM E2952 is often shown through third-party certification such as those issued by the Safety Equipment Institute (SEI).
