= Respiratory protective equipment =

Equipment to protect the user from breathing contaminated air

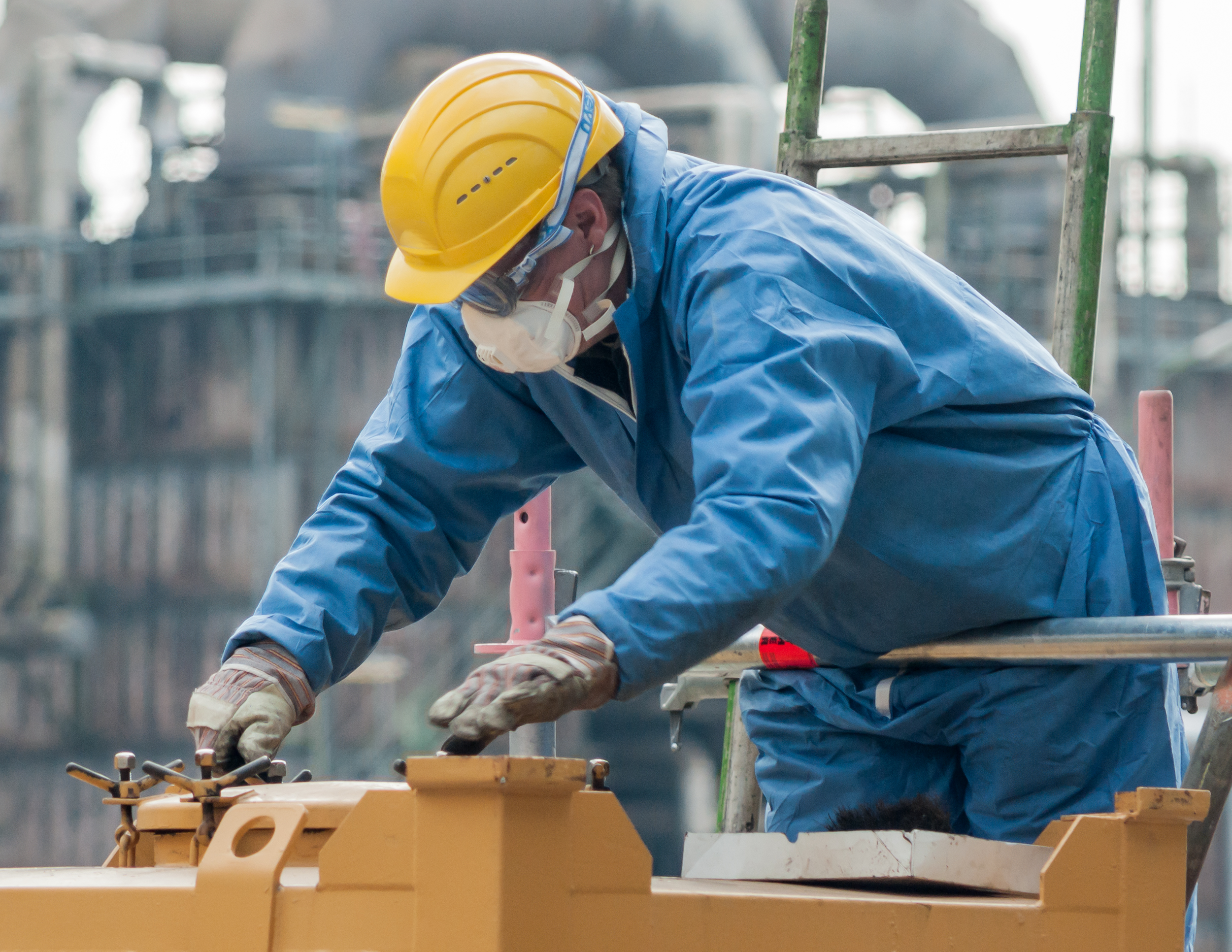
A construction worker in Cologne wearing PPE.

Respiratory protective equipment (RPE), also called protective breathing equipment (PBE) in the US, is a form of personal protective equipment designed to protect the wearer from a variety of airborne hazards in the form of a gas, fume, mist, dust or vapour. Respirators filter the air to remove harmful particles and alongside the breathing apparatus (BA) provides clean air for the worker to breathe.

== UK legislation ==
RPE is covered by a number of UK laws including:

- Personal Protective Equipment Regulations, 2002
- Personal Protective Equipment at Work Regulations 1992
- Health and Safety at Work etc. Act 1974
- Control of Substances Hazardous to Health Regulations 2002.

The Health and Safety Executive advises that RPE should be appropriate for the needs of the wearer, the task they are undertaking and the environment in which it takes place.

== See also ==
- Air filter – Device composed of fibrous or porous materials which removes solid particulates from the air
- Breathing apparatus – Equipment allowing or assisting the user to breathe in a hostile environment
- Cartridges and canisters of air-purifying respirators – Container that cleans pollution from air inhaled through it
- Gas mask – Protection from inhaling airborne pollutants and toxic gases
- Powered air-purifying respirator – Full-face respirator that provides filtered air to the wearer using an electric fan
- Respirator – Device worn to protect the user from inhaling contaminants
- Automated breathing metabolic simulator
