= Helicopter Aircrew Breathing Device =

Small scuba device for escape from ditched helicopters

- Acronym: HABD
- Other names: Spare Air, Helicopter Emergency Egress Device
- Uses: Escape from ditched helicopter

The Helicopter Aircrew Breathing Device or HABD (also known as a Helicopter Emergency Egress Device HEED or SEA) is an item of survival equipment which was adopted by the military to increase the chances of survival for embarked troops and aircrew trapped in an aircraft which has ditched (crashed into a body of water). It is a form of self contained underwater breathing apparatus (scuba) which consists of a small cylinder pressurized with atmospheric air and first stage regulator worn in a pouch on the user's life vest; a pressure gauge; an air hose and a second-stage demand regulator that delivers air to the user's mouth when the internal pressure of the mouthpiece drops during inhalation, and is ruggedly constructed to survive impacts associated with emergency ditchings.

== History and design ==
Since a full-size scuba cylinder would be prohibitively bulky and heavy, especially for troops already laden with full combat gear, the HABD must be small and thus limited in capacity. It provides roughly two minutes of air at the surface. This decreases rapidly with depth and with the increased breathing rate that accompanies stress. Despite this limited capacity, the amount of air they provide has aided in survival.

Helicopter ditchings usually come with little warning, often while the pilot is attempting a ship landing or other low-altitude maneuver. Because they are top-heavy, ditched helicopters usually flip upside-down after hitting the water. The occupants will be subjected to violent motions and a rush of incoming water, which causes unsecured gear to wash through the cabin and can knock occupants unconscious. Jet fuel and hydraulic fluid may seep into the cabin and can cause blindness to open eyes and lung damage if inhaled. Occupants in a ditched helicopter will be upside-down, disoriented, often in the dark, and sinking. Immersion in cold water evokes a "gasp" response in humans, which can reduce their breath-holding ability to as little as 15 seconds. The HABD, properly used, provides personnel with a tool to help ward off panic and provide more time to escape.

The device was developed by Larry Williamson, a diver, in the late 1970's. Soon after introduction to the dive market other industries began to investigate if they could use 'Spare Air' apparatus in their situations as well. It was modified and sold to the military in 1984 under the name Helicopter Emergency Egress Device (HEED) to provide additional time to help helicopter personnel escape from a submerged helicopter in the event of ditching. It is now used by most military and government organizations in the US and in most developed countries around the world. Several dozen lives have been saved and many more people have reduced injuries due to the use of this product. The Navy has also adopted the product to protect personnel from smoke inhalation in the case of an engine room fire.

== Technical specifications ==
Cylinder capacitye	1.5cf/42.5 liters free air
Material	Aluminum
Cylinder length	10.5"/26.67 cm
Rated pressure	3,000 psi/206 bar
Weight	3 lbs/1.36 kg
Duration of air supply	Approximately 12-15 breaths at 33 ft/10m assuming 1.5 litre breath volume.
