= Pocket mask =

Device used to safely deliver first aid rescue breaths

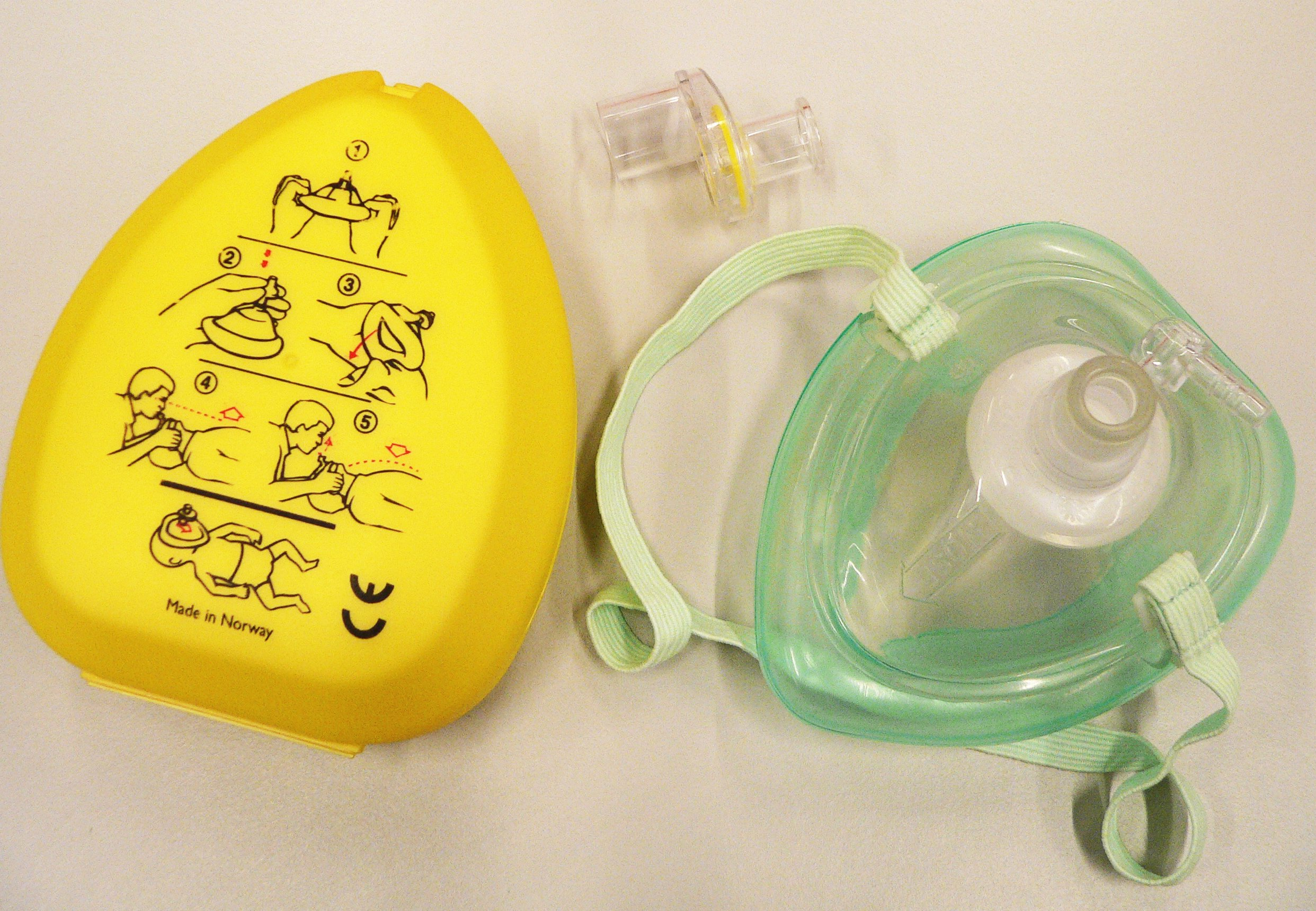
- A pocket mask with carrying case and detached one-way valve
- Specialty: Emergency medicine
- Intervention: Cardiopulmonary resuscitation
- [edit on Wikidata]

A pocket mask, pocket face mask, or CPR mask is a device used to safely deliver rescue breaths during a cardiac arrest or respiratory arrest. The specific term "Pocket Mask" is the trademarked name for the product manufactured by Laerdal Medical AS. It is not to be confused with a bag valve mask (BVM).

== Purpose ==
A pocket mask is a small portable device used in the pre-hospital setting to provide adequate ventilation to a patient who is either in respiratory failure or cardiac arrest. The pocket mask is designed to be placed over the face of the patient, thus creating a seal enclosing both the mouth and nose. Air is then administered to the patient by an emergency responder. The emergency responder exhales through a one-way filter valve, providing adequate ventilation to the patient. The emergency responder is capable of delivering up to 16% oxygen with their breath.

Modern pocket masks have either a built-in one-way valve or an attachable, disposable filter to protect the emergency responder from the patient's potentially infectious bodily substances, such as vomit or blood.

Many masks also have a built-in oxygen intake tube, allowing for the administration of 50-60% oxygen. Without being hooked up to an external line, exhaled air from the provider can still provide sufficient oxygen to live, up to 16%. Earth's atmosphere consists of approximately 21% oxygen.

== Usage ==
While a pocket mask is not as efficient as a bag valve mask, it does have its advantages when only one rescuer is available. As suggested by its name, the pocket mask benefits from a somewhat easier portability when compared to the bag valve mask. Also, in contrast to the bag valve mask, which requires two hands to operate (one to form a seal and the other to squeeze the bag), the pocket mask allows for both of the rescuer's hands to be on the patients head. This hand placement provides a superior seal on the patient's face, and allows the responder to perform a jaw thrust on patients who may have a spinal injury.

== See also ==
- Face shield – Device used to protect the wearer's face from hazards
