= Dust mask =

Pad held over the nose and mouth to protect against dust

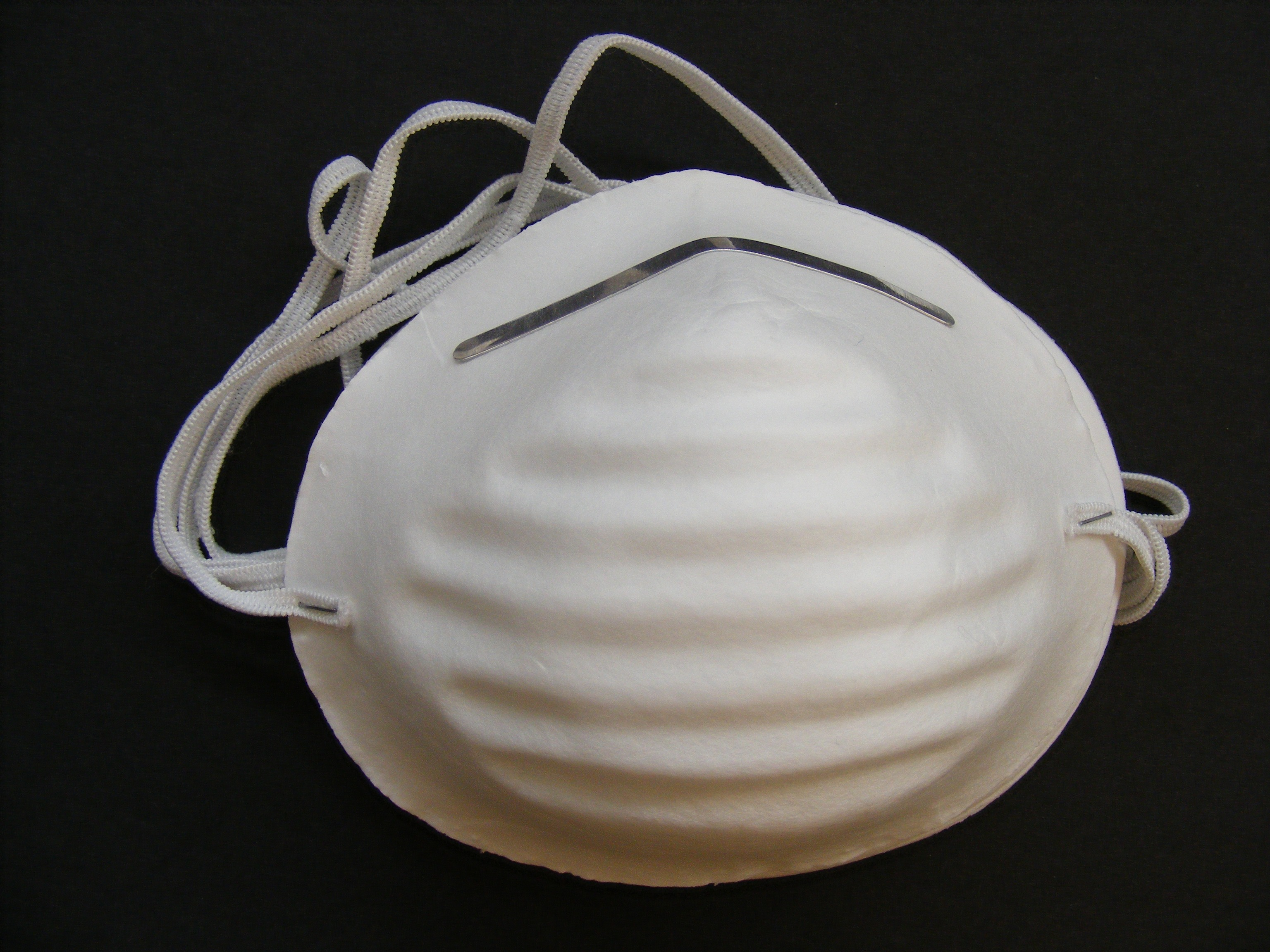
- Other name(s): ND respirator, Nuisance dust respirator, Nuisance dust mask
- [edit on Wikidata]

A dust mask is a flexible paper pad held over the nose and mouth made for protection against chronically toxic nuisance dusts, like from occupational exposure to plant dusts like hay. They are not intended to provide protection from most airborne hazards. The European FFP1 mask, the lowest-grade standard available in the jurisdiction, is an example of a dust mask, being only certified to remove ~80% of dusts and mists.

Dust masks are used in environments with dusts encountered during construction or cleaning activities, biological hazards from farming, or sweeping. A dust mask can also be worn in environments with allergens such as tree and grass pollen.

== Form ==
Dust masks, referred to in academic literature as ND, or "nuisance dust" respirators, are masks with one strap, and are designed to filter dusts in situations where risk of contracting an occupational disease, especially in the lungs, is unlikely. As of 1992, dust masks are not approved by NIOSH, and are not allowed to be used in hazardous environments, where NIOSH-approved respirators are required. Despite these requirements restricting the use of dust masks, use of dust masks in certain industries was noted.

When tested, the dust mask performed worse than a surgical mask in terms filtration efficiency of various-sized particles, but performed the best in terms of airflow. Filtration efficiency of both surgical and dust masks was considerably worse than the tested NIOSH-approved DM, DFM, and HEPA respirators of the era.

== Use ==
A notable occupational use of dust masks is in farming, where dust masks are used to avoid the effects of farmer's lung, a disease caused by the inhalation of dusts from agricultural products. The toxicity mainly comes from allergy to mold in the dust, which can lead to lung damage due to the immune response, as opposed to an inherent toxicity in the dust itself.

In a study following treating Farmer's lung with dust masks, the dust mask selected for the study was only tested to a filtration standard of 99.9% filtration of dusts greater than 1 micron (1000 nm).

== Regulation ==
Europe has a standard for masks whose filtration efficiency goes at or below 90%:

- The FFP1 standard allows up to 22% inward leakage and filtration efficiency of at least 80%.

Some Asian countries have regulations for dust-grade masks intended for everyday civilian use as opposed to occupational use. These include:

- China, GB/T 32610:2016 – masks for daily protection
- South Korea, KF80

Dust masks have been certified by the United States Bureau of Mines since the 1930s, until being phased out after the passage of 42 CFR 84.

- D or DM respirators, standing for 'Dust' and 'Dust/Mist' approval respectively, without approval for 'Fumes,' asbestos, radionuclides, or any certified (30 CFR) HEPA filtration. However, as of 1992, dust masks are not approved by NIOSH.

== See also ==
- Mechanical filter (respirator)
- Nose filter
