= Ambu (company) =

Company producing medical devices

Ambu A/S
- Company type: Aktieselskab
- Traded as: Nasdaq Copenhagen: AMBU B; OMXC25CAP component
- Industry: Healthcare
- Founded: 1956; 70 years ago
- Headquarters: Copenhagen, Denmark
- Key people: Britt Meelby Jensen, CEO; Henrik Bender, CFO
- Products: Ambu bag, Aura laryngeal mask, aScope single-use videoscope, BlueSensor electrodes, Neuroline electrodes
- Revenue: 6,037 million DKK (2025)
- Number of employees: 5,500 (2025)
- Website: www.ambu.com

Ambu, or officially Ambu A/S, is a Danish company that develops, produces and markets single-use endoscopy solutions, diagnostic and life-supporting equipment to hospitals, private practices, and rescue services.

It was founded in Denmark in 1937, as Testa Laboratorium, by German engineer Holger Hesse.

The largest business areas are anesthesia, cardiology, neurology, pulmonology, urology and gastroenterology. The company's most important products are devices for artificial ventilation, single-use endoscopes and single-use electrodes for ECG tests and neurophysiological mappings.
