= Edgar Pask =

British anaesthetist (1912–1966)

Edgar Alexander Pask OBE (4 September 1912 – 30 May 1966) was a British anaesthetist and experimental physiologist. His academic career was spent at the University of Durham (Newcastle upon Tyne site), where he was reader in anaesthetics (1947–49) and then held a chair from 1949 until his death. He was the second professor of anaesthetics in the UK. He also headed the anaesthetics department at the Royal Victoria Infirmary in Newcastle.

== Early life, education and early career ==
Pask was born on 4 September 1912, to Mary (née Speedie) and Percy Pask. His birthplace is variously given as Derby and West Kirby, then in Cheshire. His father was in the fruit import–export business in Cheshire, having risen from being a Liverpool barrow boy. His mother, a committed Methodist, was from the Isle of Man, and the family moved there after June 1928. Pask had two brothers; his elder brother (Alfred) became a Methodist minister, and his younger brother was the well-known cybernetics researcher, Gordon Pask.

Pask attended Rydal School, a Methodist boarding school in North Wales, and then read natural sciences at Downing College, Cambridge, graduating in 1934. He gained his MB BChir (1937) at the London Hospital (now the Royal London Hospital), where he continued to work until moving to Oxford, at first as an anaesthetist at the Radcliffe Infirmary and from 1939 or early 1940, at the Nuffield Department of Anaesthetics as junior assistant under Robert Macintosh. After the Dunkirk evacuation of 1940, Pask was assigned to the Royal Sussex Hospital to treat the wounded.

His medical education was interrupted by the Second World War; he submitted his MD thesis, based on his work during and shortly after the war, to the University of Cambridge at the end of 1946, and was not awarded his MD degree until after he had been appointed reader at Durham.

== Career ==
Pask enlisted in the Royal Air Force (RAF) in 1941, and spent the war working with Macintosh at the Physiological Laboratory (subsequently the RAF Institute of Aviation Medicine), based at Farnborough in Hampshire, gaining the rank of squadron leader. Part of this research was featured in the 1942 film In Which We Serve. At the end of the war, Pask visited Hamburg with Roland H. Winfield to investigate experiments carried out in Germany by the Oberkommando der Luftwaffe.

After his RAF discharge, Pask visited North America, working briefly with the anaesthetist Ralph M. Waters in Madison, Wisconsin, and the neurosurgeon Wilder Penfield in Montreal. On his return, he served as reader in anaesthetics at the Newcastle upon Tyne site of the University of Durham (1947–49) and was appointed to a chair in 1949 – only the second professorship in the discipline in the UK – which he held until his death. The Newcastle site became the University of Newcastle upon Tyne in 1963. At the time of his death he was also the director of the Royal Victoria Infirmary's department of anaesthetics in Newcastle; during his career he held various administrative positions at that hospital, including chairing its medical advisory committee and its building and planning committee.

== Research ==
Pask's best-known research was performed in collaboration with Robert Macintosh during the Second World War, mainly at the RAF Physiological Laboratory in Farnborough, and related to diverse issues affecting aircrew safety.

=== Parachute descent ===
He initially studied the effects of oxygen deprivation (hypoxia). These experiments predominantly used himself as a test subject, although several other volunteers were also included. They were conducted by breathing a mixture of oxygen and nitrogen/nitrous oxide at changing ratios, calculated to simulate descent from altitude, as if bailing out of an aircraft. They found that above around 35,000–40,000 feet, parachutists would need to be supplied with oxygen to survive, and even at lower simulated altitudes the hypoxic subject was often so confused that in a real bailout, he would be at risk of failing to trigger his parachute. The resulting recommendation was that portable oxygen supplies to be used during parachute descent were required whenever aircraft flew above 30,000 feet, a practice adopted by the RAF from 1942.

=== Survival at sea ===
Pask and Macintosh then studied life jackets, attempting to identify a design that worked when the wearer was unconscious, rather than turning them face down in the water, as many existing designs including the "Mae West" proved to do. Pask volunteered to be anaesthetised to act as the unconscious person in multiple tests where he was thrown into a tank or pool, some of which were documented on film and shown to airforce personnel. With Macintosh, Pask developed a coaxial breathing system to facilitate these experiments. They tested various British, American and German designs, finding that the Luftwaffe Kapok waistcoat design worked best with an unconscious subject. Pask also worked on life jackets that could be used in conjunction with pressure suits and other specialist equipment.

Pask investigated designs of survival clothing that might protect airmen against hypothermia in very low water temperatures. He studied a range of inner and outer materials, looking to combine warmth with water resistance. Again he volunteered to test his designs, this time by parachuting into the sea off Shetland during winter. The survival suits that resulted were used by the RAF.

He researched artificial respiration methods that were suitable for application to an almost-drowned airman under adverse conditions in an air–sea rescue vessel. The Schafer method, recommended at the start of the war, was impractical under these conditions. These experiments were initiated in 1943, and continued in 1946, again using Pask as the anaesthetised subject; some of the later experiments involved the administration of curare to induce muscle paralysis. Several different methods were compared, including those devised by Schafer, Sylvester and Eve, as well as the Oxford inflating bellows technique, with Pask concluding that the rocking method devised by Frank Eve was the most effective and convenient under the circumstances.

=== Post-war research and legacy ===
At Newcastle, after the war, Pask worked on refining mechanical lung ventilators, assisted by Norman Burn, and also worked on patient monitoring devices. In his obituary in The Lancet, he is described as having "mechanical skill and wide knowledge of electronics". He maintained his involvement with sea rescue in civilian life, developing a waterproof, floating dummy in the mid-1950s known as "Seaworthy Sierra Sam" that was used to test life jackets.

For his war-time research, Park was described as "the bravest man in the RAF who never flew an aircraft". His work is credited with saving a "significant" number of lives during the war; the lifejacket studies alone have been estimated to have prevented hundreds of airmen from drowning. Much of it was swiftly rendered obsolete by technological advances, but his research on sea survival suit designs was still being applied by the British armed forces in the 1960s.

== Personal life ==
Pask married Muriel O'Brien in 1954; she was a Catholic and worked as a nurse. The couple had a daughter in 1955. They kept a holiday home at Castletown on the Isle of Man.

In later life Pask had long-standing health problems – in part due to his work during the war – which led him to decline an offer of a Wellcome Trust-funded chair at McGill University, Canada in 1955. He died from a heart attack on 30 May 1966 at Jesmond, Newcastle upon Tyne, at the age of 53. His grave is at the West Road cemetery in Newcastle.

== Awards, honours and legacy ==
His awards during his lifetime include an OBE (1944) and one of the three inaugural John Snow silver medals of the Association of Anaesthetists of Great Britain and Ireland (AAGBI; 1946). He was posthumously given the Royal National Lifeboat Institution's silver medal. The AAGBI's Pask Award and an RAF research award were named for him.
