= Frank Cecil Eve =

British physician (1871–1952)

- Born: Francis Cecil Eve; 15 February 1871; Silsoe, England
- Died: 7 December 1952 (aged 81); Beverley, England
- Scientific career
- Fields: Medicine
- Institutions: Hull Royal Infirmary

Francis Cecil Eve FRCP (15 February 1871 – 7 December 1952) was a senior British physician, known for developing the "Eve Method" of artificial respiration.

== Biography ==
Eve was born on 15 February 1871 in Silsoe, to Jacob Richard Eve and his wife. He was educated at Bedford School, at Emmanuel College, Cambridge, and at St Thomas's Hospital Medical School. He worked at the University of Leeds, then gained medical experience from St Thomas' Hospital. In 1906, he moved to Kingston upon Hull, subsequently becoming a Consultant Physician at the Hull Royal Infirmary, as well as at the Victoria Hospital for Children.

In 1915, he was elected as a Fellow of the Royal College of Physicians. In 1932, his use of a rocking method of artificial respiration, which was named for him: the "Eve Method". Following further study from Robert Macintosh and Edgar Pask, the method was adopted by the Royal Navy in 1943, as well as by the Swedish Navy, to clear water from the lungs of soldiers. The method replaced the compression-based method developed in 1903, by Edward Albert Sharpey-Schafer. In 1931, he developed an early iteration of the rocking bed. Throughout his career, he also made contributions to the studies of diabetes, pernicious anemia, and psychology. He also chaired the Hull Medical Society and served as president of East Riding region of the British Medical Association.

In 1911, he married physician Sarah Ellice Buyers; they had one son together. An outdoorsman, he enjoyed ice skating and fishing, among other hobbies. During World War I, his home in Hull was destroyed in a bombing, after which he moved to Beverley. He died in Beverley on 7 December 1952, aged 81, in Beverley.
