= Holger Hesse =

German engineer (1900–1967)

- Born: 1900; Berlin, Germany
- Died: 1967
- Occupation: Engineer
- Known for: Ambu bag

Holger Hesse (1900–1967) was a German engineer. Together with his partner, Danish anesthetist Henning Ruben, he invented the world's first non-electric, self-inflating resuscitator, the Ambu bag, in 1956.
