= Charles Hederer =

- Born: 1886; Vesoul
- Died: 1967 (aged 80–81); Chariez
- Known for: pulmoventilateur
- Scientific career
- Fields: medicine

Charles Hederer (2 August 1886 – 24 September 1967) was the inventor of the 'pulmoventilateur' a mechanical device used for artificial respiration.
