= The Watson Institute =

Non-profit serving persons with disabilities

Coordinates: 40°34′26″N 80°12′18″W

- Headquarters: Sewickley, Pennsylvania, US
- Website: thewatsoninstitute.org

The Watson Institute, previously known as the D. T. Watson Rehabilitation Hospital and the D.T. Watson Home for Crippled Children, is an organization dedicated to providing for people with special needs in Sewickley, Pennsylvania, United States. Founded in 1917, it was one of the first sites to test the Jonas Salk vaccine for polio in 1952.

== History ==
=== D.T. Watson Home for Crippled Children ===
David Thomas Watson, a lawyer, and his wife Margaret owned a 140-acre (57 ha) estate named "Sunny Hill" in Sewickley, Pennsylvania. Thompson had done business with William Henry Vanderbilt and Andrew Carnegie, and worked on the Alaska Purchase. They specified in their wills that upon their deaths, their property would be made into a home for young girls. After they died, the D.T. Watson Home for Crippled Children was formally founded in 1917 as a residential school for children with disabilities. It began accepting students in 1920.

Jessie Wright became the chief of physiotherapy at the Watson home in 1924; in 1935, she was appointed the director of physical medicine. In 1943, Sister Elizabeth Kenny taught students the "Kenny Method" of treating polio survivors at the Home. In the 1950s, the home was chosen alongside Harvard University, Stanford University, and Northwestern University by the National Association of Infantile Paralysis to provide emergency care for those without access to hospitals. In June 1952, Jonas Salk reached out to Wright about testing his polio vaccine at the Watson Home. On June 12, 1952, Salk took blood samples from forty-five child residents and twenty-seven staff. After typing the antibodies in the samples, Salk returned on July 2 and began inoculating those who had no antibodies in their system. None of those inoculated developed adverse reactions, nor did any come down with polio.

Estimates place the number of children cared for between 1920 and 1970 at around 3,200.

In January 1980, the name of the home was changed to the D. T. Watson Rehabilitation Hospital; at the time, around 100 children were being treated in-patient, out-patient, and as dayschool students. The scope of care was expanded to adults later in the 1980s.

=== Watson Institute ===
In 1999, in order to refocus on their original mission to children, the organization sold its rehabilitation hospital affiliate to HealthSouth Corporation, including 33 acres (13 ha) of their 98-acre (40 ha) property. Renaming themselves to The Watson Institute, they began leasing back one wing of the building to continue to use as the school until the constriction of a $15.6 million facility was completed in 2002.

In 2015, the Institute announced they would be opening a new facility in South Fayette for the 2016 school year for 125 students. In 2017, it opened a new center in Bridgeville.

Pennsylvania's Historical and Museum Commission placed a historical marker at the original school site in 2018.
