= Rocking bed =

Mechanical respirator

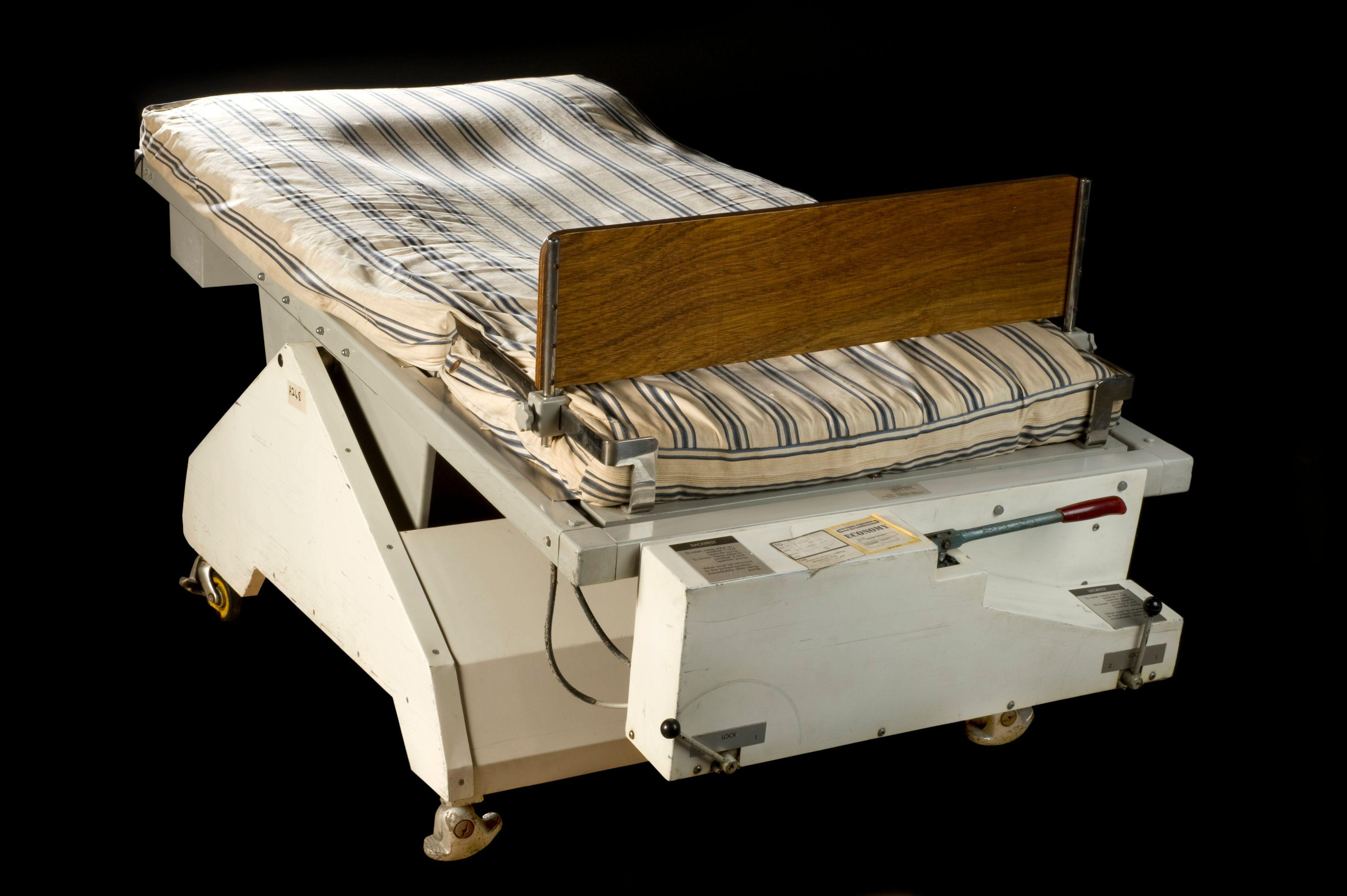
- An example of a rocking bed
- Industry: Medical
- Application: Treatment of polio
- Inventor: Frank Cecil Eve; C. E. Sanders; Charlotte Baron; Jessie Wright
- Invented: 1931; 1944 (for polio)

The rocking bed was used for artificial respiration in the treatment of poliomyelitis as an alternative to the iron lung.

== History ==
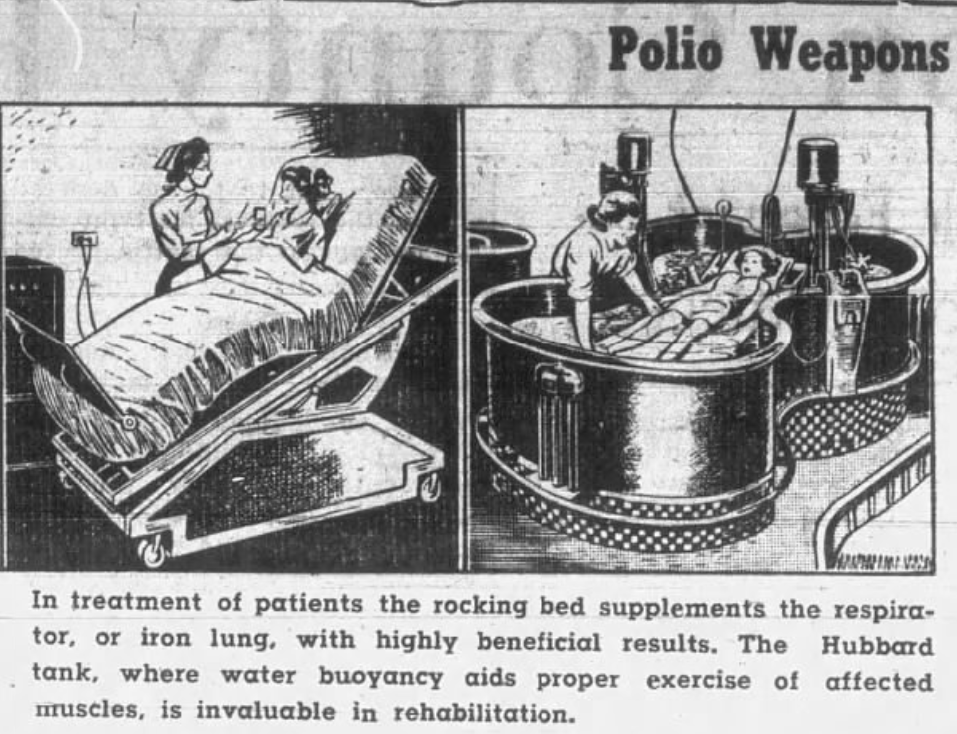
A newspaper illustration showing a rocking bed

In 1931, Frank Cecil Eve experimented with a rocking stretcher as a means of artificial respiration. Through tilting between 30° and 45° at a rate aligned with natural breathing, Eve reported that respiration was maintained for several days. In 1936, Sanders began using this bed to treat vascular disease.

=== Treatment for polio ===
In 1944, Jessie Wright, an English-born doctor in Pittsburgh, began experimenting with the Sanders bed to treat polio. Charlotte M. Baron, a public health nurse, oversaw the designing of the bed and by September 1946 trials were being conducted.

Using the rocking bed, patients were able to spend increasing periods outside the iron lung, gradually progressing toward self-sustaining respiration. A cuirass attached to a pump would create negative pressure to increase respiratory activity further. By 1951, the ability of rocking beds to quicken the weaning process from the iron lung had been noted. Some doctors believed that early treatment of polio could result in only usage of the rocking bed being required, and not the iron lung. However, research indicated that early-stage polio could be treated well by the bed, but those in an acute stage were unable to have their needs met. By 1951, over 200 rocking beds were in hospitals, and by 1964, the American Journal of Nursing reported that of some 1,612 people experiencing some degree of paralysis from polio in the United States, 334 were using iron lungs and 677 were using rocking beds.
