= Polio vaccine =

Vaccine to prevent poliomyelitis

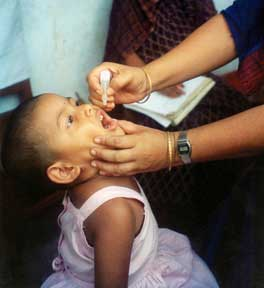

Vaccine description
- Target: Poliomyelitis
- Vaccine type: IPV: inactivated OPV: attenuated nOPV2: attenuated, genetically stabilised

Clinical data
- Trade names: Ipol, Poliovax, others
- AHFS/Drugs.com: Monograph
- MedlinePlus: a601177
- License data: US DailyMed: Ipol
- Pregnancy category: AU: B2
- Routes of administration: IPV: parenteral OPV: oral
- ATC code: J07BF01 (WHO) J07BF02 (WHO) J07BF03 (WHO) J07BF04 (WHO)

Legal status
- Legal status: US: ℞-only

Identifiers
- CAS Number: 1008119-78-5
- DrugBank: DB10796; DB10797
- ChemSpider: None
- KEGG: D05543

Polio vaccine is a vaccine used to prevent poliomyelitis (polio). Two types are used: an inactivated poliovirus given by injection (IPV) and a weakened poliovirus given by mouth (OPV). The World Health Organization (WHO) recommends all children be fully vaccinated against polio. The two vaccines have eliminated polio from most of the world, and reduced the number of cases reported each year from an estimated 350,000 in 1988 to 33 in 2018.

The inactivated polio vaccines are very safe. Mild redness or pain may occur at the site of injection. Oral polio vaccines cause about three cases of vaccine-associated paralytic poliomyelitis per million doses given. This compares with 5,000 cases per million who are paralysed following a polio infection. Both types of vaccine are generally safe to give during pregnancy and in those who have HIV/AIDS, but are otherwise well. However, the emergence of circulating vaccine-derived poliovirus (cVDPV), a form of the vaccine virus that has reverted to causing poliomyelitis, has led to the development of novel oral polio vaccine type 2 (nOPV2), which aims to make the vaccine safer and thus stop further outbreaks of cVDPV.

The first successful demonstration of a polio vaccine was by Hilary Koprowski in 1950, with a live attenuated virus that people drank. The vaccine was not approved for use in the United States, but was used successfully elsewhere. The success of an inactivated (killed) polio vaccine, developed by Jonas Salk, was announced in 1955. Another attenuated live oral polio vaccine, developed by Albert Sabin, came into commercial use in 1961.

The polio vaccine is on the World Health Organization's List of Essential Medicines.

== Medical uses ==
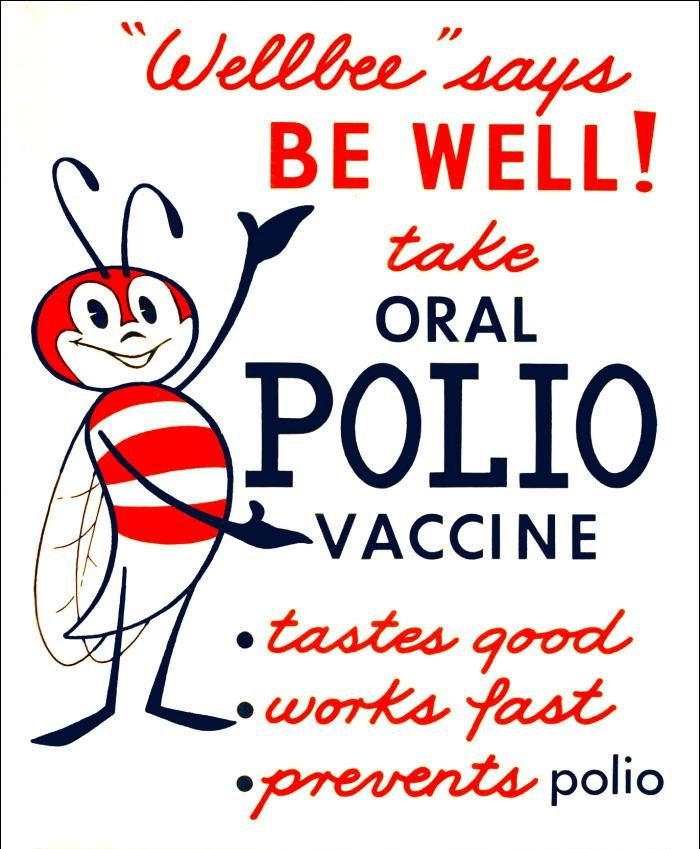
This 1963 poster featured the United States Centers for Disease Control and Prevention's national symbol of public health, the "Wellbee", encouraging the public to receive an oral polio vaccine.

Interruption of person-to-person transmission of the virus by vaccination is important in global polio eradication. This is because no long-term carrier state exists for poliovirus in individuals with normal immune function, polio viruses have no non-primate reservoir in nature, and the survival of the virus in the environment for an extended period appears to be remote. The two types of vaccine are inactivated polio vaccine (IPV) and oral polio vaccine (OPV).

=== Inactivated ===
When the IPV (injection) is used, 90% or more of individuals develop protective antibodies to all three serotypes of poliovirus after two doses, and at least 99% are immune following three doses. The duration of immunity induced by IPV is not known with certainty, although a complete series is thought to protect for many years. IPV replaced the oral vaccine in many developed countries in the 1990s mainly due to the (small) risk of vaccine-derived polio in the oral vaccine.

=== Attenuated ===
Oral polio vaccines are easier to administer than IPV, as they eliminate the need for sterile syringes, so are more suitable for mass vaccination campaigns. OPV also provided longer-lasting immunity than the Salk vaccine, as it provides both humoral immunity and cell-mediated immunity.

One dose of trivalent OPV produces immunity to all three poliovirus serotypes in roughly 50% of recipients. Three doses of live-attenuated OPV produce protective antibodies to all three poliovirus types in more than 95% of recipients. As with other live-virus vaccines, immunity initiated by OPV is probably lifelong. OPV produces excellent immunity in the intestine, the primary site of wild poliovirus entry, which helps prevent infection with wild virus in areas where the virus is endemic. OPV does not require special medical equipment or extensive training. Attenuated poliovirus derived from the OPV is excreted for a few days after vaccination, potentially infecting and thus indirectly inducing immunity in unvaccinated individuals, thus amplifying the effects of the doses delivered. Taken together, these advantages have made it the favored vaccine of many countries, and it has long been preferred by the global eradication initiative.

cVDPV cases (red line) outnumbered wild polio cases (blue line) for the first time in 2017

The primary disadvantage of OPV derives from its inherent, if small, risks. As an attenuated but active virus, it can induce vaccine-associated paralytic poliomyelitis (VAPP) in roughly one individual per every 2.7 million doses administered. The live virus can circulate in under-vaccinated populations (termed either variant poliovirus or circulating vaccine-derived poliovirus, cVDPV), and over time can revert to a neurovirulent form causing paralytic polio. This genetic reversal of the pathogen to a virulent form takes considerable time and does not affect the person who was originally vaccinated. With wild polio cases at record lows, 2017 was the first year where more cases of cVDPV were recorded than the wild poliovirus.

Until recent times, a trivalent OPV containing all three viral strains was used, nearly eradicating polio infection worldwide. With the complete eradication of wild poliovirus type 2 this was phased out in 2016 and replaced with bivalent vaccine containing just types 1 and 3, supplemented with monovalent type 2 OPV in regions where cVDPV type 2 was known to circulate. The switch to the bivalent vaccine and associated missing immunity against type 2 strains, among other factors, led to outbreaks of circulating vaccine-derived poliovirus type 2 (cVDPV2), which increased from two cases in 2016 to 1037 cases in 2020.

A novel OPV2 vaccine (nOPV2), which has been genetically modified to reduce the likelihood of disease-causing activating mutations, was granted emergency licencing in 2021, and subsequently full licensure in December 2023. This has greater genetic stability than the traditional oral vaccine and is less likely to revert to a virulent form. Genetically stabilised vaccines targeting poliovirus types 1 and 3 are in development, with the intention that these will eventually completely replace the Sabin vaccines.

=== Schedule ===
Inactivated poliovirus vaccine immunization schedule

IPV number unvaccinated

In countries with endemic polio or where the risk of imported cases is high, the WHO recommends OPV vaccine at birth followed by a primary series of three OPV doses and at least one IPV dose starting at 6 weeks of age, with a minimum of 4 weeks between OPV doses. In countries with more than 90% immunization coverage and low risk of importation, the WHO recommends one or two IPV doses starting at two months of age followed by at least two OPV doses, with the doses separated by 4–8 weeks depending on the risk of exposure. In countries with the highest levels of coverage and the lowest risks of importation and transmission, the WHO recommends a primary series of three IPV injections, with a booster dose after an interval of six months or more if the first dose was administered before two months of age.

== Side effects ==
The inactivated polio vaccines are very safe. Mild redness or pain may occur at the site of injection. They are generally safe to be given to pregnant women and those who have HIV/AIDS, but are otherwise well.

=== Allergic reaction to the vaccine ===
Inactivated polio vaccine can cause an allergic reaction in a few people, since the vaccine contains trace amounts of antibiotics, streptomycin, polymyxin B, and neomycin. It should not be given to anyone who has an allergic reaction to these medicines. Signs and symptoms of an allergic reaction, which usually appear within minutes or a few hours after receiving the injected vaccine, include breathing difficulties, weakness, hoarseness or wheezing, heart-rate fluctuations, skin rash, and dizziness.

=== Vaccine-associated paralytic polio ===
A potential adverse effect of the Sabin OPV is caused by its known potential to recombine to a form that causes neurological infection and paralysis. The Sabin OPV results in vaccine-associated paralytic poliomyelitis (VAPP) in around one individual per every 2.7 million doses administered, with symptoms identical to wild polio. Due to its improved genetic stability, the novel OPV (nOPV) has a reduced risk of this occurring.

=== Contamination concerns ===
In 1960, the rhesus monkey kidney cells used to prepare the poliovirus vaccines were determined to be infected with the simian virus-40 (SV40), which was also discovered in 1960 and is a naturally occurring virus that infects monkeys. In 1961, SV40 was found to cause tumors in rodents. More recently, the virus was found in certain forms of cancer in humans, for instance brain and bone tumors, pleural and peritoneal mesothelioma, and some types of non-Hodgkin lymphoma. However, SV40 has not been determined to cause these cancers.

SV40 was found to be present in stocks of the injected form of the IPV in use between 1955 and 1963; it is not found in the OPV form. Over 98 million Americans received one or more doses of polio vaccine between 1955 and 1963, when a proportion of vaccine was contaminated with SV40; an estimated 10–30 million Americans may have received a dose of vaccine contaminated with SV40. Later analysis suggested that vaccines produced by the former Soviet bloc countries until 1980, and used in the USSR, China, Japan, and several African countries, may have been contaminated, meaning hundreds of millions more may have been exposed to SV40.

In 1998, the National Cancer Institute undertook a large study, using cancer case information from the institute's SEER database. The published findings from the study revealed no increased incidence of cancer in persons who may have received vaccine containing SV40. Another large study in Sweden examined cancer rates of 700,000 individuals who had received potentially contaminated polio vaccine as late as 1957; the study again revealed no increased cancer incidence between persons who received polio vaccines containing SV40 and those who did not. The question of whether SV40 causes cancer in humans remains controversial, however, and the development of improved assays for detection of SV40 in human tissues will be needed to resolve the controversy.

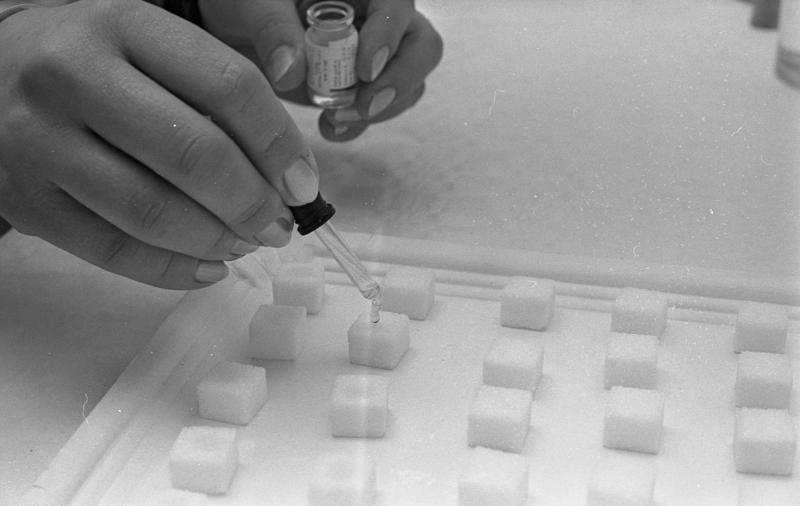
Doses of oral polio vaccine are added to sugar cubes for use in a 1967 vaccination campaign in Bonn, West Germany

During the race to develop an oral polio vaccine, several large-scale human trials were undertaken. By 1958, the National Institutes of Health had determined that OPV produced using the Sabin strains was the safest. Between 1957 and 1960, however, Hilary Koprowski continued to administer his vaccine around the world. In Africa, the vaccines were administered to roughly one million people in the Belgian territories (now the Democratic Republic of the Congo, Rwanda, and Burundi). The results of these human trials have been controversial, and unfounded accusations in the 1990s arose that the vaccine had created the conditions necessary for transmission of simian immunodeficiency virus from chimpanzees to humans, causing HIV/AIDS. These hypotheses, however, have been conclusively refuted. By 2004, cases of poliomyelitis in Africa had been reduced to just a small number of isolated regions in the western portion of the continent, with sporadic cases elsewhere. Recent local opposition to vaccination campaigns has evolved due to lack of adequate information, often relating to fears that the vaccine might induce sterility. The disease has since resurged in Nigeria and several other African nations without necessary information, which epidemiologists believe is due to refusals by certain local populations to allow their children to receive the polio vaccine.

== Manufacture ==
=== Inactivated ===
The Salk vaccine, IPV, is based on three wild, virulent reference strains, Mahoney (type 1 poliovirus), MEF-1 (type 2 poliovirus), and Saukett (type 3 poliovirus), grown in a type of monkey kidney tissue culture (Vero cell line), which are then inactivated with formalin. The injected Salk vaccine confers IgG-mediated immunity in the bloodstream, which prevents polio infection from progressing to viremia and protects the motor neurons, thus eliminating the risk of bulbar polio and post-polio syndrome.

In the United States, the vaccine is administered along with the tetanus, diphtheria, and acellular pertussis vaccines (DTaP) and a pediatric dose of hepatitis B vaccine. In the UK, IPV is combined with tetanus, diphtheria, pertussis, and Haemophilus influenzae type b vaccines.

=== Attenuated ===
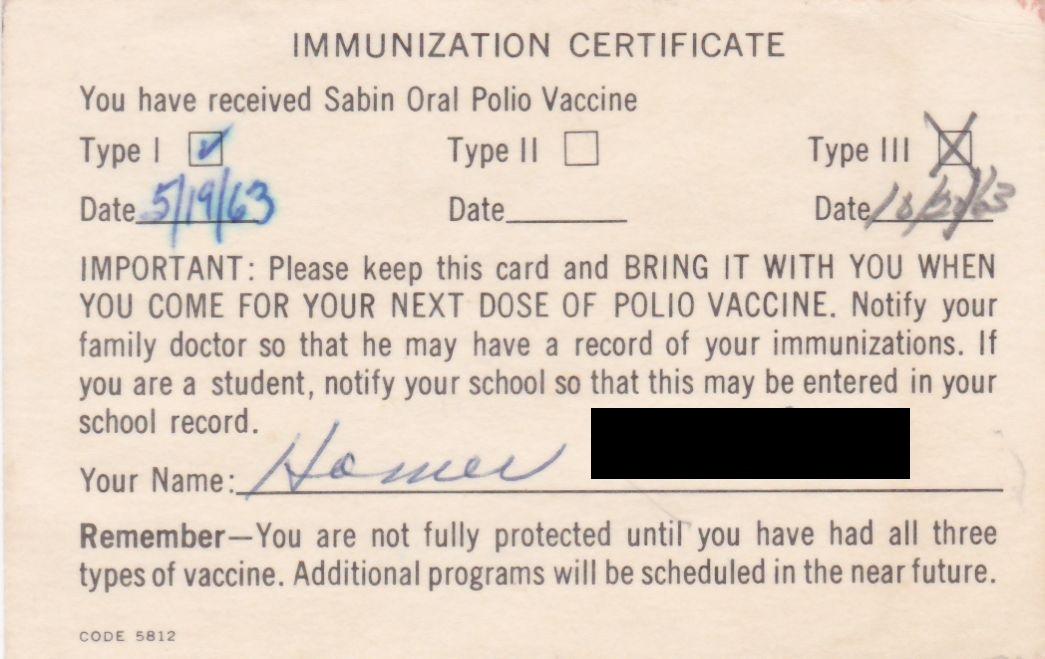
Sabin immunization certificate

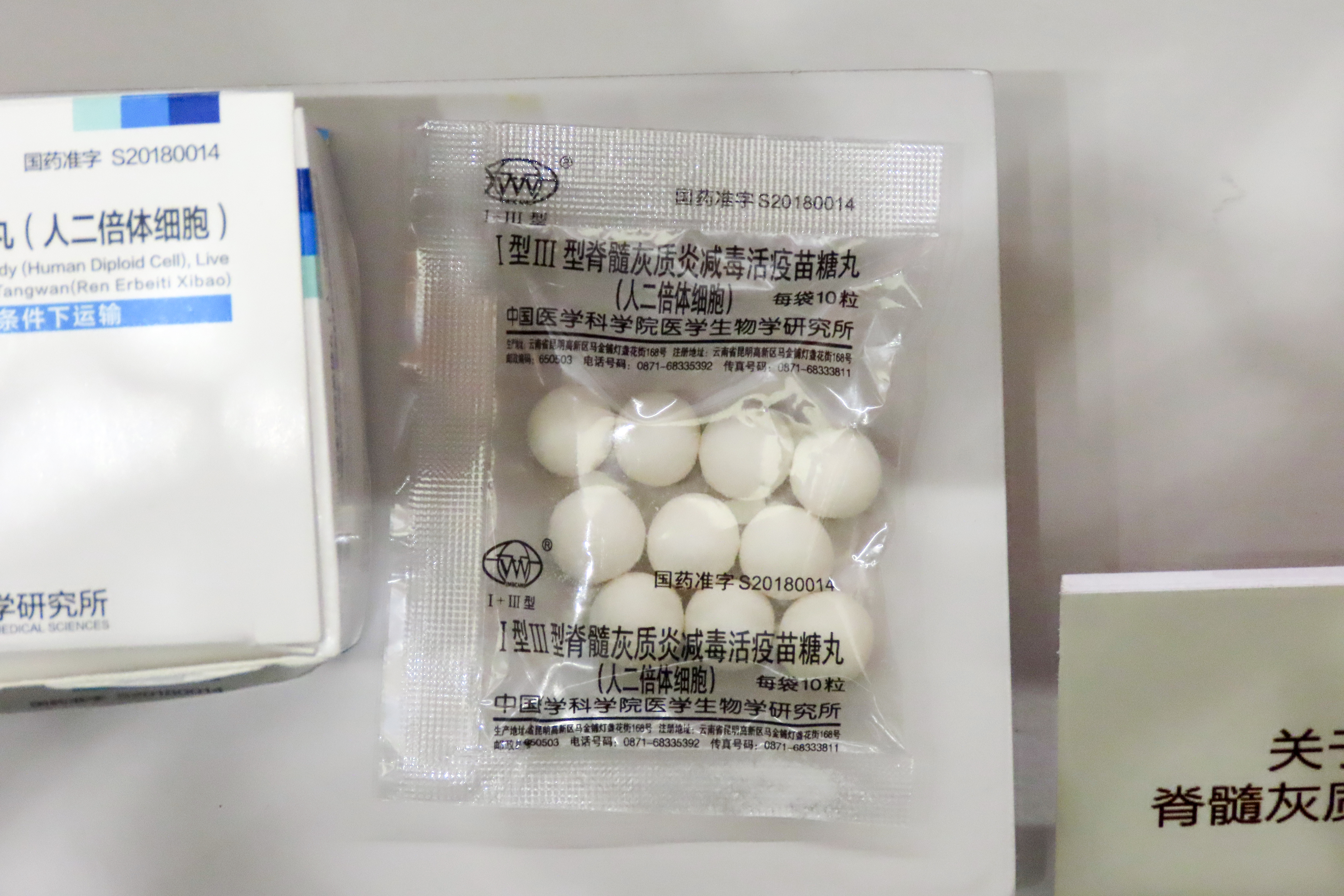
Example of OPV in dragee candy

OPV is an attenuated vaccine, produced by the passage of the virus through nonhuman cells at a subphysiological temperature, which produces spontaneous mutations in the viral genome. Oral polio vaccines were developed by several groups, one of which was led by Albert Sabin. Other groups, led by Hilary Koprowski and H.R. Cox, developed their attenuated vaccine strains. In 1958, the NIH created a special committee on live polio vaccines. The various vaccines were carefully evaluated for their ability to induce immunity to polio while retaining a low incidence of neuropathogenicity in monkeys. Large-scale clinical trials performed in the Soviet Union in the late 1950s to early 1960s by Mikhail Chumakov and his colleagues demonstrated the safety and high efficacy of the vaccine. Based on these results, the Sabin strains were chosen for worldwide distribution. Fifty-seven nucleotide substitutions distinguish the attenuated Sabin 1 strain from its virulent parent (the Mahoney serotype), two nucleotide substitutions attenuate the Sabin 2 strain, and 10 substitutions are involved in attenuating the Sabin 3 strain. The primary attenuating factor common to all three Sabin vaccines is a mutation located in the virus's internal ribosome entry site, which alters stem-loop structures and reduces the ability of poliovirus to translate its RNA template within the host cell. The attenuated poliovirus in the Sabin vaccine replicates very efficiently in the gut, the primary site of infection and replication, but is unable to replicate efficiently within nervous system tissue. In 1961, type 1 and 2 monovalent oral poliovirus vaccine (MOPV) was licensed, and in 1962, type 3 MOPV was licensed. In 1963, trivalent OPV (TOPV) was licensed, and became the vaccine of choice in the United States and most other countries of the world, largely replacing the inactivated polio vaccine. A second wave of mass immunizations led to a further dramatic decline in the number of polio cases. Between 1962 and 1965, about 100 million Americans (roughly 56% of the population at that time) received the Sabin vaccine. The result was a substantial reduction in the number of poliomyelitis cases, even from the much-reduced levels following the introduction of the Salk vaccine.

OPV is usually provided in vials containing 10–20 doses of vaccine. A single dose of oral polio vaccine (usually two drops) contains 1,000,000 infectious units of Sabin 1 (effective against PV1), 100,000 infectious units of the Sabin 2 strain, and 600,000 infectious units of Sabin 3. The vaccine contains small traces of antibiotics—neomycin and streptomycin—but does not contain preservatives.

== History ==
In a generic sense, vaccination works by priming the immune system with an "immunogen". Stimulating immune response, by use of an infectious agent, is known as immunization. The development of immunity to polio efficiently blocks person-to-person transmission of wild poliovirus, thereby protecting both individual vaccine recipients and the wider community.

The development of two polio vaccines led to the first modern mass inoculations. The last cases of paralytic poliomyelitis caused by endemic transmission of wild virus in the United States occurred in 1979, with an outbreak among the Amish in several Midwest states.

=== 1930s ===
In the early 1930s, Maurice Brodie led a team from the public health laboratory of the city of New York, while John A. Kolmer collaborated with the Research Institute of Cutaneous Medicine in Philadelphia.

==== Kolmer's live vaccine ====
Kolmer began his vaccine development project in 1932 and ultimately focused on producing an attenuated or live virus vaccine. Inspired by the success of vaccines for rabies and yellow fever, he hoped to use a similar process to denature the polio virus. To go about attenuating his polio vaccine, he repeatedly passed the virus through monkeys. Using methods of production that were later described as "hair-raisingly amateurish, the therapeutic equivalent of bath-tub gin", Kolmer ground the spinal cords of his infected monkeys and soaked them in a salt solution. He then filtered the solution through mesh, treated it with ricinolate, and refrigerated the product for 14 days to ultimately create what would later be prominently critiqued as a "veritable witches brew".

In keeping with the norms of the time, Kolmer completed a relatively small animal trial with 42 monkeys before proceeding to self-experimentation in 1934. He tested his vaccine upon himself, his two children, and his assistant. He gave his vaccine to just 23 more children before declaring it safe and sending it out to doctors and health departments for a larger test of efficacy. By April 1935, he was able to report having tested the vaccine on 100 children without ill effect. Kolmer's first formal presentation of results did not come about until November 1935, when he presented the results of 446 children and adults he had vaccinated with his attenuated vaccine. He also reported that together the Research Institute of Cutaneous Medicine and the Merrell Company of Cincinnati (the manufacturer who held the patent for his ricinoleating process) had distributed 12,000 doses of vaccine to some 700 physicians across the United States and Canada. Kolmer did not describe any monitoring of this experimental vaccination program, nor did he provide these physicians with instructions in how to administer the vaccine or how to report side effects. Kolmer dedicated the bulk of his publications thereafter to explaining what he believed to be the cause of the 10+ reported cases of paralytic polio following vaccination, in many cases in towns where no polio outbreak had occurred. Six of these cases had been fatal. Kolmer had no control group, but asserted that many more children would have gotten sick.

==== Brodie's inactivated vaccine ====
At nearly the same time as Kolmer's project, Maurice Brodie had joined immunologist William H. Park at the New York City Health Department, where they worked together on poliovirus. With the aid of grant funding from the President's Birthday Ball Commission (a predecessor to what would become the March of Dimes), Brodie was able to pursue the development of an inactivated or "killed virus" vaccine. Brodie's process also began by grinding the spinal cords of infectious monkeys and then treating the cords with various germicides, ultimately finding a solution of formaldehyde to be the most effective. By 1 June 1934, Brodie was able to publish his first scholarly article describing his successful induction of immunity in three monkeys with inactivated poliovirus. Through continued study on an additional 26 monkeys, Brodie ultimately concluded that administration of live virus vaccine tended to result in humoral immunity, while administration of killed virus vaccine tended to result in tissue immunity.

Soon after, following a similar protocol to Kolmer's, Brodie proceeded with self-experimentation upon himself and his co-workers at the NYC Health Department laboratory. Brodie's progress was eagerly covered by popular press, as the public hoped for a successful vaccine to become available. Such reporting did not make mention of the 12 children in a New York City Asylum who were subjected to early safety trials. As none of the subjects experienced ill effects, Park, described by contemporaries as "never one to let grass grow under his feet", declared the vaccine safe. When a severe polio outbreak overwhelmed Kern County, California, it became the first trial site for the new vaccine on very short notice. Between November 1934 and May 1935, over 1,500 doses of the vaccine were administered in Kern County. While initial results were very promising, insufficient staffing and poor protocol design left Brodie open to criticism when he published the California results in August 1935. Through private physicians, Brodie also conducted a broader field study, including 9,000 children who received the vaccine and 4,500 age- and location-matched controls who did not receive a vaccine. Again, the results were promising. Of those who received the vaccine, only a few went on to develop polio. Most had been exposed before vaccination and none had received the full series of vaccine doses being studied. Additionally, a polio epidemic in Raleigh, North Carolina, provided an opportunity for the U.S. Public Health Service to conduct a highly structured trial of the Brodie vaccine using funding from the Birthday Ball Commission.

==== Academic reception ====
While their work was ongoing, the larger community of bacteriologists began to raise concerns regarding the safety and efficacy of the new poliovirus vaccines. At this time, very little oversight of medical studies occurred and the ethical treatment of study participants largely relied upon moral pressure from peer academic scientists. Brodie's inactivated vaccines faced scrutiny from many who felt killed virus vaccines could not be efficacious. While researchers were able to replicate the tissue immunity he had produced in his animal trials, the prevailing wisdom was that humoral immunity was essential for an efficacious vaccine. Kolmer directly questioned the killed virus approach in scholarly journals. Kolmer's studies, however, had raised even more concern with increasing reports of children becoming paralysed following vaccination with his live-virus vaccine and notably, with paralysis beginning at the arm rather than the foot in many cases. Both Kolmer and Brodie were called to present their research at the Annual Meeting of the American Public Health Association in Milwaukee, Wisconsin, in October 1935. Additionally, Thomas M. Rivers was asked to discuss each of the presented papers as a prominent critic of the vaccine development effort. This resulted in the APHA arranging a symposium on poliomyelitis to be delivered at the annual meeting of their southern branch the following month. During the discussion at this meeting, James Leake of the U.S. Public Health Service stood to immediately present clinical evidence that the Kolmer vaccine had caused several deaths and then allegedly accused Kolmer of being a murderer. As Rivers recalled in his oral history, "All hell broke loose, and it seemed as if everybody was trying to talk at the same time ... Jimmy Leake used the strongest language that I have ever heard used at a scientific meeting." In response to the attacks from all sides, Brodie was reported to have stood up and stated, "It looks as though, according to Dr. Rivers, my vaccine is no good, and according to Dr. Leake, Dr Kolmer's is dangerous." Kolmer simply responded by stating, "Gentlemen, this is one time I wish the floor would open up and swallow me." Ultimately, Kolmer's live vaccine was undoubtedly shown to be dangerous and had already been withdrawn in September 1935 before the Milwaukee meeting. While the consensus of the symposium was largely skeptical of the efficacy of Brodie's vaccine, its safety was not in question and the recommendation was for a much larger, well-controlled trial. However, when three children became ill with paralytic polio following a dose of the vaccine, the directors of the Warm Springs Foundation in Georgia (acting as the primary funders for the project) requested it be withdrawn in December 1935. Following its withdrawal, the previously observed moratorium on human poliomyelitis vaccine development resumed and another attempt would not be made for nearly 20 years.

While Brodie had arguably made the most progress in the pursuit of a poliovirus vaccine, he suffered the most significant career repercussions due to his status as a less widely known researcher. Modern researchers recognize that Brodie may well have developed an effective polio vaccine, but the basic science and technology of the time were insufficient to understand and use this breakthrough. Brodie's work using formalin-inactivated virus later became the basis for the Salk vaccine, but he did not live to see this success. Brodie was fired from his position within three months of the symposium's publication. While he was able to find another laboratory position, he died of a heart attack only three years later at age 36. By contrast, Park, who was believed in the community to be reaching senility at this point in his older age, was able to retire from his position with honors before he died in 1939. Kolmer, already an established and well-respected researcher, returned to Temple University as a professor of medicine. Kolmer had a very productive career, receiving multiple awards, and publishing countless papers, articles, and textbooks until his retirement in 1957.

=== 1948 ===
A breakthrough came in 1948 when a research group headed by John Enders at the Children's Hospital Boston successfully cultivated the poliovirus in human tissue in the laboratory. This group had recently successfully grown mumps in cell culture. In March 1948, Thomas H. Weller was attempting to grow varicella virus in embryonic lung tissue. He had inoculated the planned number of tubes when he noticed that a few unused tubes remained. He retrieved a sample of mouse brain infected with poliovirus and added it to the remaining test tubes, on the off chance that the virus might grow. The varicella cultures failed to grow, but the polio cultures were successful. This development greatly facilitated vaccine research and ultimately allowed for the development of vaccines against polio. Enders and his colleagues, Thomas H. Weller and Frederick C. Robbins, were recognized in 1954 for their efforts with a Nobel Prize in Physiology or Medicine. Other important advances that led to the development of polio vaccines included the identification of three poliovirus serotypes (poliovirus type 1 – PV1, or Mahoney; PV2, Lansing; and PV3, Leon), the finding that before paralysis, the virus must be present in the blood, and the demonstration that administration of antibodies in the form of gamma globulin protects against paralytic polio.

=== 1950–1955 ===
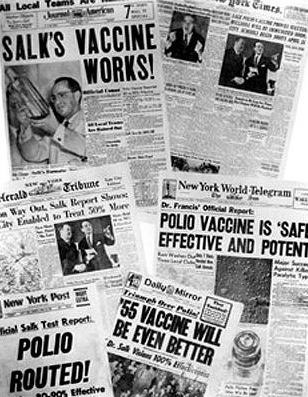
1955 newspaper headlines on the development of an effective polio vaccine

During the early 1950s, polio rates in the U.S. were above 25,000 annually; in 1952 and 1953, the U.S. experienced an outbreak of 58,000 and 35,000 polio cases, respectively, up from a typical number of some 20,000 a year, with deaths in those years numbering 3,200 and 1,400. Amid this U.S. polio epidemic, millions of dollars were invested in finding and marketing a polio vaccine by commercial interests, including Lederle Laboratories in New York under the direction of H. R. Cox. Also working at Lederle was Polish-born virologist and immunologist Hilary Koprowski of the Wistar Institute in Philadelphia, who tested the first successful polio vaccine, in 1950. His vaccine, however, being a live attenuated virus taken orally, was still in the research stage and would not be ready for use until five years after Jonas Salk's polio vaccine (a dead-virus injectable vaccine) had reached the market. Koprowski's attenuated vaccine was prepared by successive passages through the brains of Swiss albino mice. By the seventh passage, the vaccine strains could no longer infect nervous tissue or cause paralysis. After one to three further passages on rats, the vaccine was deemed safe for human use. On 27 February 1950, Koprowski's live, attenuated vaccine was tested for the first time on an 8-year-old boy living at Letchworth Village, an institution for physically and mentally disabled people located in New York. After the child had no side effects, Koprowski enlarged his experiment to include 19 other children.

==== Jonas Salk ====
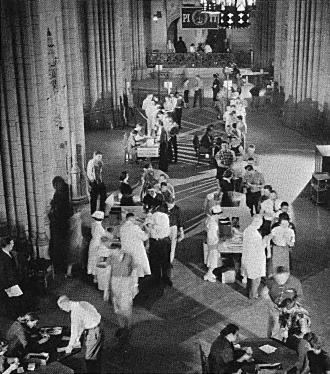
Administration of the polio inoculation, including by Salk himself, in 1957 at the University of Pittsburgh, where his team had developed the vaccine

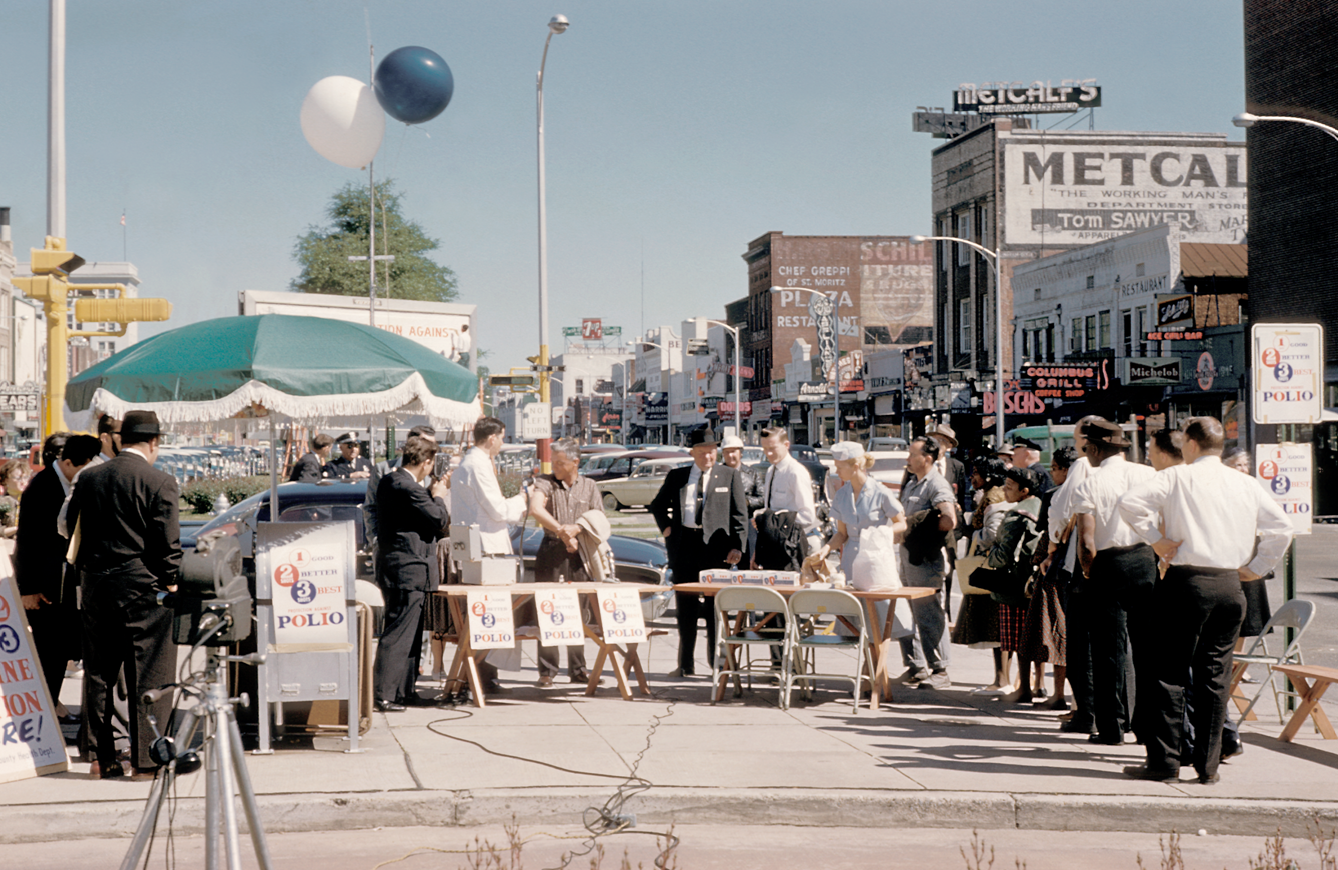
Mass polio vaccination in Columbus, Georgia circa 1961 for the National Polio Immunization Program

The first effective polio vaccine was developed in 1952 by Jonas Salk and a team at the University of Pittsburgh that included Julius Youngner, Byron Bennett, L. James Lewis, and Lorraine Friedman, which required years of subsequent testing. Salk went on CBS radio to report a successful test on a small group of adults and children on 26 March 1953; two days later, the results were published in JAMA. Leone N. Farrell invented a key laboratory technique that enabled the mass production of the vaccine by a team she led in Toronto. Beginning 23 February 1954, the vaccine was tested at Arsenal Elementary School and the Watson Home for Children in Pittsburgh, Pennsylvania.

Salk's vaccine was then used in a test called the Francis Field Trial, led by Thomas Francis, the largest medical experiment in history at that time. The test began with about 4,000 children at Franklin Sherman Elementary School in McLean, Virginia, and eventually involved 1.8 million children, in 44 states from Maine to California. By the conclusion of the study, roughly 440,000 received one or more injections of the vaccine, about 210,000 children received a placebo, consisting of harmless culture media, and 1.2 million children received no vaccination and served as a control group, who would then be observed to see if any contracted polio.

The results of the field trial were announced on 12 April 1955 (the tenth anniversary of the death of President Franklin D. Roosevelt, whose paralytic illness was generally believed to have been caused by polio). The Salk vaccine had been 60–70% effective against PV1 (poliovirus type 1), over 90% effective against PV2 and PV3, and 94% effective against the development of bulbar polio. Soon after Salk's vaccine was licensed in 1955, children's vaccination campaigns were launched. In the U.S., following a mass immunization campaign promoted by the March of Dimes, the annual number of polio cases fell from 35,000 in 1953 to 5,600 by 1957. By 1961 only 161 cases were recorded in the United States.

A week before the announcement of the Francis Field Trial results in April 1955, Pierre Lépine at the Pasteur Institute in Paris had also announced an effective polio vaccine.

==== Safety incidents ====
In April 1955, soon after mass polio vaccination began in the US, the Surgeon General began to receive reports of patients who contracted paralytic polio about a week after being vaccinated with the Salk polio vaccine from the Cutter pharmaceutical company, with the paralysis starting in the limb the vaccine was injected into. The Cutter vaccine had been used in vaccinating 409,000 children in the western and midwestern United States. Later investigations showed that the Cutter vaccine had caused 260 cases of polio, killing 11. In response, the Surgeon General pulled all polio vaccines made by Cutter Laboratories from the market. Eli Lilly, Parke-Davis, Pitman-Moore, and Wyeth polio vaccines were also reported to have paralyzed numerous children. It was soon discovered that some lots of Salk polio vaccine made by Cutter, Wyeth, and the other labs had not been properly inactivated, allowing live poliovirus into more than 100,000 doses of vaccine. In May 1955, the National Institutes of Health and Public Health Services established a Technical Committee on Poliomyelitis Vaccine to test and review all polio vaccine lots and advise the Public Health Service as to which lots should be released for public use. These incidents reduced public confidence in the polio vaccine, leading to a drop in vaccination rates.

=== 1961 ===
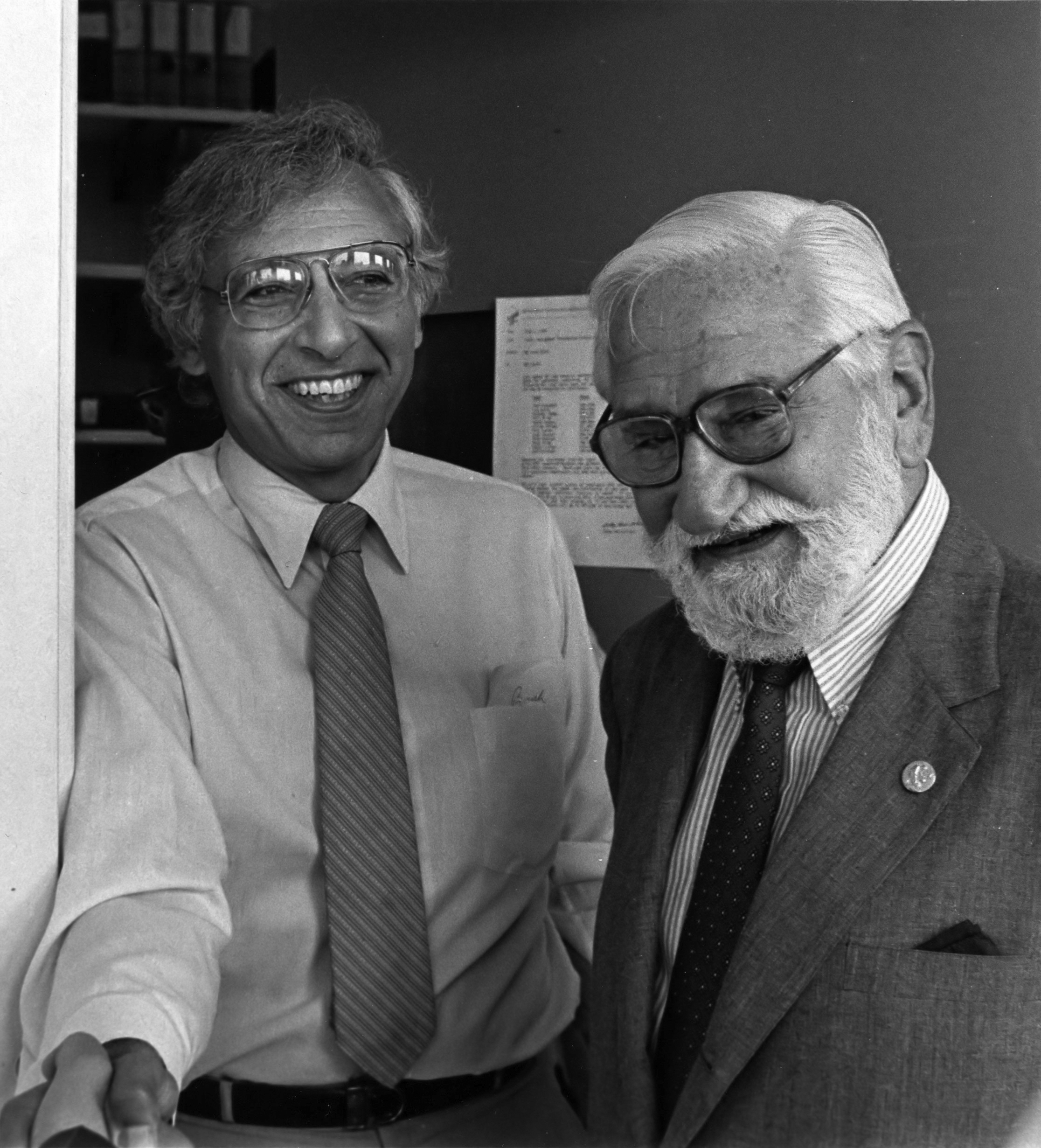
Albert Sabin (right) with Robert Gallo, circa 1985

At the same time that Salk was testing his vaccine, both Albert Sabin and Hilary Koprowski continued working on developing a vaccine using live virus. During a meeting in Stockholm to discuss polio vaccines in November 1955, Sabin presented results obtained on a group of 80 volunteers, while Koprowski read a paper detailing the findings of a trial enrolling 150 people. Sabin and Koprowski both eventually succeeded in developing vaccines. Because of the commitment to the Salk vaccine in America, Sabin and Koprowski both did their testing outside the United States, Sabin in Mexico and the Soviet Union, Koprowski in the Congo and Poland. In 1957, Sabin developed a trivalent vaccine containing attenuated strains of all three types of poliovirus. In 1959, ten million children in the Soviet Union received the Sabin oral vaccine. For this work, Sabin was given the medal of the Order of Friendship of Peoples, described as the Soviet Union's highest civilian honor. Sabin's oral vaccine using live virus came into commercial use in 1961.

Once Sabin's oral vaccine became widely available, it supplanted Salk's injected vaccine, which had been tarnished in the public's opinion by the Cutter incident of 1955, in which Salk vaccines improperly prepared by one company resulted in several children dying or becoming paralyzed.

==== Japan ====
In the early 1960s, Japan Broadcasting Corporation (NHK) journalist Tetsu Ueda and his colleagues played a pivotal role in raising public awareness about polio outbreaks in Japan. NHK began broadcasting daily reports from regional bureaus on new polio cases, which significantly heightened public concern. This surge in national anxiety prompted the Minister of Health and Welfare to make a political decision to urgently import the Soviet live attenuated vaccine (Sabin), leading to rapid containment of the disease. According to Professor Munehiro Hirayama of the University of Tokyo, the success of this campaign was largely due to the passionate efforts of Ueda and the NHK team committed to polio eradication.

=== 1987 ===
An enhanced-potency IPV was licensed in the United States in November 1987, and is currently the vaccine of choice there. The first dose of the polio vaccine is given shortly after birth, usually between 1 and 2 months of age, and a second dose is given at 4 months of age. The timing of the third dose depends on the vaccine formulation but should be given between 6 and 18 months of age. A booster vaccination is given at 4 to 6 years of age, for a total of four doses at or before school entry. In some countries, a fifth vaccination is given during adolescence. Routine vaccination of adults (18 years of age and older) in developed countries is neither necessary nor recommended because most adults are already immune and have a very small risk of exposure to wild poliovirus in their home countries. In 2002, a pentavalent (five-component) combination vaccine (called Pediarix) containing IPV was approved for use in the United States.

=== 1988 ===
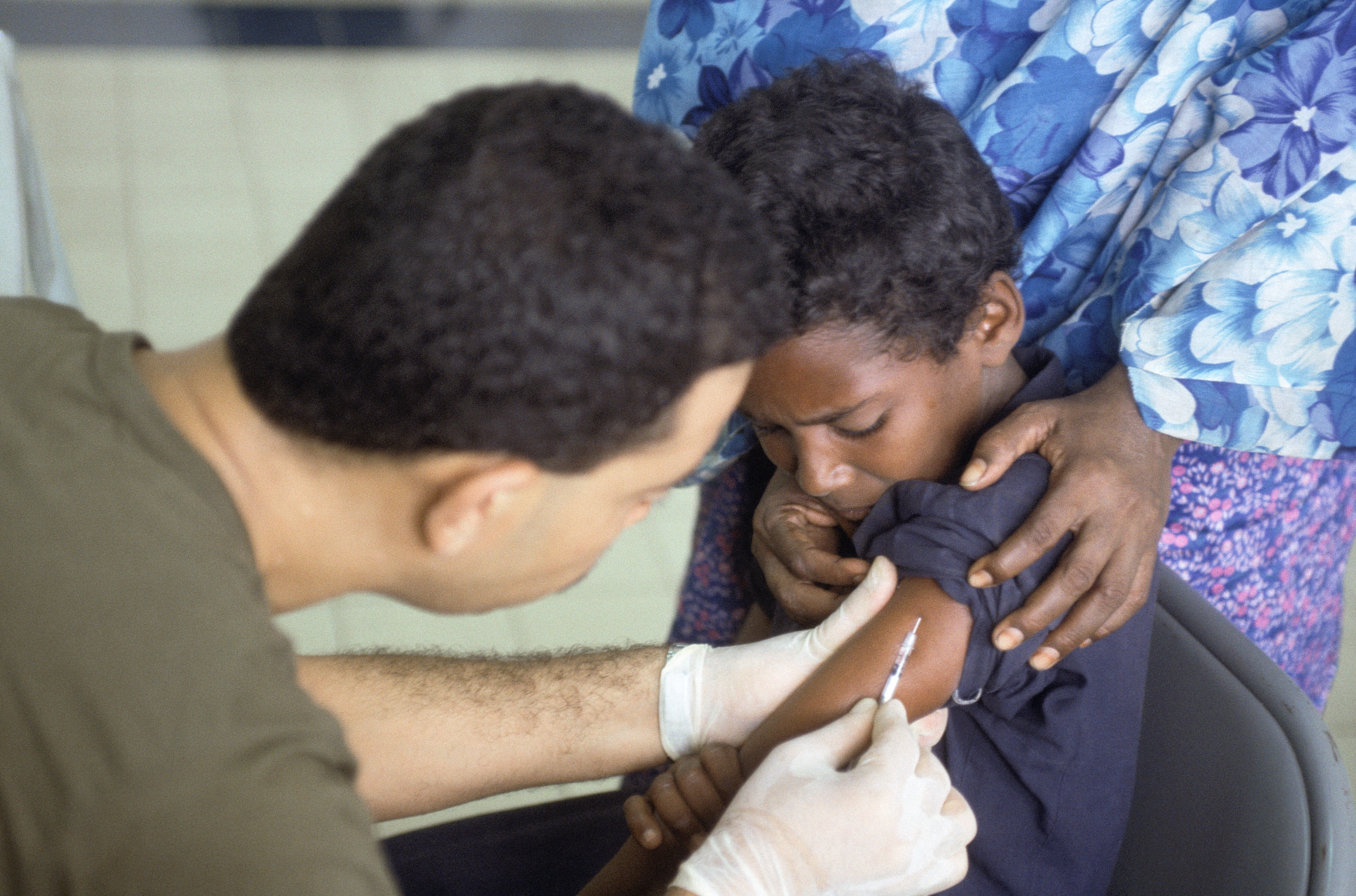
A Somali boy is injected with inactivated poliovirus vaccine (Mogadishu, 1993)

A global effort to eradicate polio, led by the World Health Organization (WHO), UNICEF, and the Rotary Foundation, began in 1988, and has relied largely on the oral polio vaccine developed by Albert Sabin and Mikhail Chumakov (Sabin-Chumakov vaccine).

=== After 1990 ===
Polio was eliminated in the Americas by 1994. The disease was officially eliminated in 36 Western Pacific countries, including China and Australia, in 2000. Europe was declared polio-free in 2002. Since January 2011, no cases of the disease have been reported in India, hence in February 2012, the country was taken off the WHO list of polio-endemic countries. In March 2014, India was declared a polio-free country.

Although poliovirus transmission has been interrupted in much of the world, transmission of wild poliovirus does continue and creates an ongoing risk for the importation of wild poliovirus into previously polio-free regions. If importations of poliovirus occur, outbreaks of poliomyelitis may develop, especially in areas with low vaccination coverage and poor sanitation. As a result, high levels of vaccination coverage must be maintained. In November 2013, the WHO announced a polio outbreak in Syria. In response, the Armenian government put out a notice asking Syrian Armenians under age 15 to get the polio vaccine. As of 2014, polio virus had spread to 10 countries, mainly in Africa, Asia, and the Middle East, with Pakistan, Syria, and Cameroon advising vaccinations to outbound travellers.

Polio vaccination programs have been resisted by some people in Pakistan and Afghanistan – the two countries with remaining wild polio cases as of 2020. Almost all Muslim religious and political leaders have endorsed the vaccine, but a fringe minority believes that the vaccines are secretly being used for the sterilisation of Muslims. The fact that the CIA organized a fake vaccination program in 2011 to help find Osama bin Laden is an additional cause of distrust. In 2015, the WHO announced a deal with the Taliban to encourage them to distribute the vaccine in areas they control. However, the Pakistani Taliban was not supportive. On 11 September 2016, two unidentified gunmen associated with the Pakistani Taliban, Jamaat-ul-Ahrar, shot Zakaullah Khan, a doctor who was administering polio vaccines in Pakistan. The leader of the Jamaat-ul-Ahrar claimed responsibility for the shooting and stated that the group would continue this type of attack. Such resistance to and skepticism of vaccinations has consequently slowed down the polio eradication process within the two remaining endemic countries.

== Travel requirements ==
Polio vaccination is required for travellers: From all countries, to all countries From some countries, to all countries From some countries, to all countries From some countries, to some countries To some countries From some countries

Travellers who wish to enter or leave certain countries must be vaccinated against polio, usually at most 12 months and at least 4 weeks before crossing the border, and be able to present a vaccination record/certificate at the border checks. Most requirements apply only to travel to or from so-called 'polio-endemic', 'polio-affected', 'polio-exporting', 'polio-transmission', or 'high-risk' countries. As of August 2020, Afghanistan and Pakistan are the only polio-endemic countries in the world (where wild polio has not yet been eradicated). Several countries have additional precautionary polio vaccination travel requirements, for example to and from 'key at-risk countries', which as of December 2020 include China, Indonesia, Mozambique, Myanmar, and Papua New Guinea.

Polio vaccination requirements for international travel
Country	Details
Afghanistan	Travellers from polio-endemic countries (Pakistan) need Carte Jaune proof of polio vaccination (received between 4 weeks and 12 months before departure) upon arrival. Residents and all travellers staying in Afghanistan longer than 4 weeks need proof of polio vaccination (received between 4 weeks and 12 months before departure) when departing from Afghanistan.
Belize	Travellers from Afghanistan and Pakistan need Carte Jaune proof of OPV or IPV vaccination (received between 4 weeks and 12 months before departure) upon arrival. Belize residents travelling to countries with confirmed polio cases also need proof of vaccination.
Brunei	Travellers from polio-exporting countries need Carte Jaune proof of OPV or IPV vaccination (received between 4 weeks and 12 months before departure) upon arrival.
Egypt	Travellers from Afghanistan, Angola, Benin, Cameroon, the Central African Republic, China, Congo-Kinshasa, Ethiopia, Ghana, Indonesia, Kenya, Mozambique, Myanmar, Niger, Nigeria, Pakistan, Papua New Guinea, Philippines, and Somalia need Carte Jaune proof of OPV or IPV vaccination (received between 4 weeks and 12 months before departure) upon arrival.
Georgia	Travellers from at-risk countries need Carte Jaune proof of OPV or IPV vaccination (received between 4 weeks and 12 months before departure) upon arrival. Travellers without proof are offered OPV vaccination upon arrival.
India	Travellers from Afghanistan, Congo-Kinshasa, Ethiopia, Kenya, Nigeria, Pakistan, Somalia, and Syria need Carte Jaune proof of OPV or IPV vaccination (received between 4 weeks and 12 months before departure) upon arrival.
Iran	Travellers from Afghanistan, Pakistan, and Nigeria need Carte Jaune proof of OPV or IPV vaccination (received between 4 weeks and 12 months before departure) upon arrival. Travellers without proof will be vaccinated upon arrival.
Iraq	Travellers aged 15+ from Afghanistan and Pakistan need Carte Jaune proof of OPV or IPV vaccination (received between 4 weeks and 12 months before departure) upon arrival; children under age 15 must have received three doses of polio vaccine before travel. Travellers without proof will be vaccinated upon arrival. Travellers departing from Iraq to Afghanistan and Pakistan must also provide proof of vaccination upon departure.
Jordan	Travellers from Afghanistan and Pakistan need Carte Jaune proof of OPV or IPV vaccination (received between 4 weeks and 12 months before departure) upon arrival.
Lebanon	Travellers from and to polio-affected countries need Carte Jaune proof of OPV or IPV vaccination (received between 4 weeks and 12 months before departure) upon arrival.
Libya	Travellers from Afghanistan and Pakistan need Carte Jaune proof of OPV or IPV vaccination (received between 4 weeks and 12 months before departure) upon arrival.
Maldives	Travellers from and to polio-exporting countries, as well as Hajj and Umrah pilgrims, need Carte Jaune proof of OPV or IPV vaccination (received between 4 weeks and 12 months before departure) upon arrival.
Morocco	Travellers from polio-affected countries need Carte Jaune proof of OPV or IPV vaccination (received between 4 weeks and 12 months before departure) upon arrival.
Nepal	Travellers from Afghanistan, Kenya, Nigeria, Pakistan, and Papua New Guinea need Carte Jaune proof of OPV or IPV vaccination (received between 4 weeks and 12 months before departure) upon arrival.
Oman	Travellers from polio-exporting countries need Carte Jaune proof of OPV or IPV vaccination (received between 4 weeks and 12 months before departure) upon arrival.
Pakistan	Travellers from ALL countries planning to stay in Pakistan for more than 4 weeks need Carte Jaune proof of OPV vaccination upon arrival. Residents and all travellers staying in Pakistan longer than 4 weeks need proof of OPV vaccination when departing from Pakistan.
Philippines	Travellers from or to high-risk countries need Carte Jaune proof of polio vaccination upon arrival or before departure, respectively. Due to an ongoing local VDPV2 outbreak, the government recommends all others travellers to consider getting a polio vaccine or booster dose, depending on their situation.
Qatar	Travellers from polio-exporting countries (identified by Qatar as: Afghanistan, Nigeria, Pakistan, and the Philippines) need Carte Jaune proof of OPV or IPV vaccination (received between 4 weeks and 12 months before departure) upon arrival.
Saint Kitts and Nevis	Travellers from polio-endemic countries as identified by WHO (Afghanistan and Pakistan) need Carte Jaune proof of OPV or IPV vaccination (received between 4 weeks and 12 months before departure) upon arrival.
Saudi Arabia	Travellers from active-transmission (including wild or vaccine-derived poliovirus) and at-risk countries, as well as all travellers from Afghanistan, Congo-Kinshasa, Mozambique, Myanmar, Niger, Nigeria, Pakistan, Papua New Guinea, Somalia, Syria, and Yemen, need Carte Jaune proof of OPV or IPV vaccination (received between 4 weeks and 12 months before departure) upon arrival. Regardless of immunisation status, all travellers from Afghanistan, Myanmar, Nigeria, Pakistan, Papua New Guinea, Somalia, Syria, and Yemen will be given an Oral Polio Vaccine dose upon arrival.
Seychelles	Travellers from countries with polio outbreaks need Carte Jaune proof of OPV or IPV vaccination (received between 4 weeks and 12 months before departure) upon arrival.
Syria	Travellers from Cameroon, Equatorial Guinea, and Pakistan need Carte Jaune proof of OPV or IPV vaccination (received between 4 weeks and 12 months before departure) upon arrival. All Syria residents departing Syria to any country also need proof of vaccination.
Ukraine	Long-term visitors departing to states with wild or circulating vaccine-derived poliovirus transmission should present Carte Jaune proof of vaccination with at least one dose of bivalent OPV or IPV (received between 4 weeks and 12 months before departure). Persons obliged to undertake urgent international travel must be immunised with a single dose of polio vaccine before their departure. There is also risk of poliovirus transmission inside Ukraine itself, and travellers to Ukraine are recommended to be up to date with their polio vaccination before entry.

== Society and culture ==
=== Cost ===
As of 2015, the Global Alliance for Vaccines and Immunization supplies the inactivated vaccine to developing countries for as little as €0.75 (about US$0.85) per dose in 10-dose vials.

=== Misconceptions ===
A misconception has been present in Pakistan that the polio vaccine contains haram ingredients and could cause impotence and infertility in male children, leading some parents not to have their children vaccinated. This belief is most common in the Khyber Pakhtunkhwa province. Attacks on polio vaccination teams have also occurred, thereby hampering international efforts to eradicate polio in Pakistan and globally.
