= Jessie Wright =

American doctor (1900–1970)

Jessie Wright M.D.
- Born: September 5, 1900; Eccleshall, England
- Died: September 6, 1970 (aged 70); Royal Oak, Maryland, US
- Education: Harvard Medical School; University of Pittsburgh
- Medical career
- Notable works: Rocking bed

Jessie Wright (September 5, 1900 – September 6, 1970) was an English-born medical doctor whose research led to the rocking bed being used as a popular treatment for polio.

== Early life and education ==
Jessie Wright was born on September 5, 1900, in England. Her father was the headmaster of a parochial school in Eccleshall. At the age of six, her family emigrated to Pittsburgh. Her medical training began at the D. T. Watson Home for Crippled Children in 1920. She attended summer seminars at Harvard Medical School in 1922 and 1924. She became a license physical therapist in 1927, and earned a Bachelor of Science from the University of Pittsburgh in 1932. She earned her medical degree from the University of Pittsburgh School of Medicine in 1934. In 1935, after completing an internship at Allegheny General Hospital, she received her license to practice medicine.

== Career ==
She was appointed the director of physical medicine at The Children's Hospital, the D. T. Watson Home, and the Pittsburgh Municipal Hospital in 1935, and the Western State Psychiatric Hospital in 1945.

From 1942 to 1956, Wright served as a consultant to the Pittsburgh Department of Health. She also was a consultant to the surgeon general of the Air Force from 1950 to 1953. She was an instructor at the Pittsburgh School of Medicine, and was named an associate professor in 1951. In 1952, she began collaborating with Jonas Salk on the polio vaccine at the Watson home. In 1962, she was named the president of the American Association for Cerebral Palsy and Developmental Medicine.

=== Rocking bed ===
In 1944, Wright began experimenting with the "Sanders bed", previously used to treat vascular disease, as a treatment for polio. Charlotte Baron, a public health nurse, offered to design the bed. By September 1946, a finished product, the Respir-aid Rocking Bed, had been completed and began trials. Wright published her findings in July 1947. By 1951, over 200 rocking beds were in hospitals, and by 1964, the American Journal of Nursing reported that of some 1,612 people experiencing some degree of paralysis from polio in the United States, 334 were using iron lungs and 677 were using rocking beds.

In March and April 1956, Wright worked in Argentina to distribute medical equipment and develop plans to fight polio in the country. For her contributions towards the elimination of polio in the country, she received an award from the Argentine government in 1957.

== Later life ==
Wright was an Elder at the Bellefield Presbyterian Church. She retired in 1966, and died on September 6, 1970, of a heart malady.
