= Flow-restricted, oxygen-powered ventilation device =

Medical device

A flow-restricted, oxygen-powered ventilation device (FROPVD), also referred to as a manually triggered ventilation device (MTV), is used to assist ventilation in apneic or hypoventilating patients, although these devices can also be used to provide supplemental oxygen to breathing patients. It can be used on patients with spontaneous breaths, as there is a valve that opens automatically on inspiration. When ventilating a patient with a (FROPVD) you must ensure an adequate, constant oxygen supply is available. Once the oxygen source is depleted, the device can no longer be used because it is driven completely by an oxygen source. The (FROPVD) has a peak flow rate of 100% oxygen at up to 40 liters per minute. To use the device, manually trigger it until chest rise is noted and then release. Wait five seconds before repeating. The device must have a pressure relief valve that opens at 60cm of water pressure to avoid over ventilation and trauma to the lungs. The (FROPVD) is contraindicated in adult patients with potential chest trauma and all children. Note: ( In cases with an apneic patient the best results will be achieved using the Two person bag-valve-mask technique.) Proper training and considerable practice is required to correctly use the FROPVD devices.

The main components of flow-restricted, oxygen-powered ventilation devices include

- An inspiratory pressure safety release valve.
- A trigger or level positioned to allow both hands to remain on the mask to provide an airtight seal while supporting and tilting the patients head.
- A peak flow rate of 100% oxygen at up to 40 L/min.
- An audible alarm that goes off when the relief valve pressure is exceeded.
