= Artificial ventilation =

Assisted breathing to support life

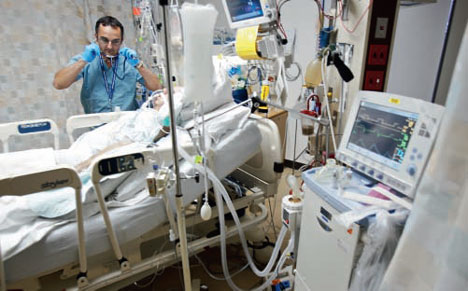
- Respiratory therapist examining a mechanically ventilated patient in an intensive care unit
- Other names: Artificial respiration
- Specialty: Critical care medicine

Artificial ventilation, also called artificial respiration, is a means of assisting or stimulating respiration. Respiration is the overall metabolic process that exchanges gases in the body through pulmonary ventilation, external respiration, and internal respiration. Artificial ventilation may take the form of manually providing air for a person who is not breathing or is not making sufficient respiratory effort, or it may take the form of mechanical ventilation involving the use of a ventilator to move air in and out of the lungs when an individual is unable to breathe on their own, such as during surgery with general anesthesia, or when an individual is in a coma or has experienced trauma.

== Types ==
=== Manual methods ===
Pulmonary ventilation is done by manual insufflation of the lungs, either by the rescuer blowing into the patient's lungs (mouth-to-mouth resuscitation), or by using a mechanical device. Mouth-to-mouth resuscitation is also part of cardiopulmonary resuscitation (CPR), making it an essential skill for first aid. In some situations, mouth-to-mouth is also performed separately, such as in near-drowning and opiate overdoses. The performance of mouth-to-mouth on its own is now limited in most protocols to health professionals, whereas lay first aiders are advised to undertake full CPR in any case where the patient is not breathing. This method of insufflation has been proved more effective than methods which involve mechanical manipulation of the patient's chest or arms, such as the Silvester method.

=== Mechanical ventilation ===
Mechanical ventilation is a method to mechanically assist or replace spontaneous breathing. This involves the use of ventilator assisted by a registered nurse, physician, physician assistant, respiratory therapist, paramedic, or other suitable person compressing a bag valve mask. Mechanical ventilation is termed "invasive" if it involves any instrument penetrating through the mouth (such as an endotracheal tube) or the skin (such as a tracheostomy tube). There are two main modes of mechanical ventilation within the two divisions: positive pressure ventilation, where air (or another gas mix) is pushed into the trachea, and negative pressure ventilation, where air is, in essence, sucked into the lungs.

Tracheal intubation is often used for short-term mechanical ventilation. This involves a tube inserted through the nose (nasotracheal intubation) or mouth (orotracheal intubation) and advanced into the trachea. In most cases, tubes with inflatable cuffs are used to prevent leakage and aspiration. Intubation with a cuffed tube is thought to provide the best protection against aspiration. The downside of tracheal tubes is the pain and coughing that follow. Therefore, unless a patient is unconscious or anesthetized, sedative drugs are usually given to provide tolerance of the tube. Other disadvantages of tracheal intubation include damage to the mucosal lining of the nasopharynx or oropharynx and subglottic stenosis.

In an emergency, a cricothyrotomy can be performed by healthcare professionals, in which an airway is inserted through a surgical opening in the cricothyroid membrane. This is similar to a tracheostomy, but a cricothyrotomy is reserved for emergency access. This is usually only used when there is a complete blockage of the pharynx, or there is massive maxillofacial injury, preventing other adjuncts from being used.

=== Neurostimulation ===
A rhythmic pacing of the diaphragm is caused with the help of electrical impulses. Diaphragm pacing is a technique used by persons with spinal cord injuries who are on a mechanical ventilator to aid with breathing, speaking, and overall quality of life. It may be possible to reduce reliance on a mechanical ventilator with diaphragm pacing. Historically, this has been accomplished through the electrical stimulation of a phrenic nerve by an implanted receiver/electrode, though today an alternative option of attaching percutaneous wires to the diaphragm exists.

== History ==
The Greek physician Galen may have been the first to describe artificial ventilation: "If you take a dead animal and blow air through its larynx through a reed, you will fill its bronchi and watch its lungs attain the greatest distention." Vesalius also describes ventilation by inserting a reed or cane into the trachea of animals.

In 1773, English physician William Hawes (1736–1808) began publicizing the power of artificial ventilation to resuscitate people who superficially appeared to have drowned. For a year he paid a reward out of his own pocket to anyone bringing him a body rescued from the water within a reasonable time of immersion. Thomas Cogan, another English physician had become interested in the same subject during a stay at Amsterdam.

In the summer of 1774, Hawes and Cogan each brought fifteen friends to a meeting at the Chapter Coffee-house in St Paul's Churchyard, where they founded the Royal Humane Society. Some methods and equipment were similar to those used today, such as wooden pipes used in the victims nostrils to blow air into the lungs. Or the use of bellows with a flexible tube for blowing tobacco smoke through the anus to revive vestigial life in the victim's intestines, which was discontinued with the eventual further understanding of respiration.

The work of English physician and physiologist Marshall Hall in 1856 suggested against the use of any type of bellows or positive pressure ventilation. These views that were held for several decades. The introduction of a common method of external manual manipulation in 1858, was the "Silvester method" invented by Henry Robert Silvester. In this technique, a patient is laid on their back and their arms are raised above their head to aid inhalation and then pressed against their chest to aid exhalation. In 1903, another manual technique, the "prone pressure" method, was introduced by Sir Edward Sharpey Schafer. It involved placing the patient on his stomach and applying pressure to the lower part of the ribs. It was the standard method of artificial respiration taught in Red Cross and similar first aid manuals for decades, until mouth-to-mouth resuscitation became the preferred technique in mid-century.

The shortcomings of manual manipulation led doctors in the 1880s to come up with improved methods of mechanical ventilation, which included Dr. George Edward Fell's "Fell method" or "Fell motor." It consisted of a bellows and a breathing valve to pass air through a tracheotomy. He collaborated with Dr. Joseph O'Dwyer to invent the Fell-O'Dwyer apparatus, a bellows instrument for the insertion and extraction of a tube down the trachea. Such methods were still looked upon as harmful, and were not adopted for many years.

In 2020, the supply of mechanical ventilation became a central question for public health officials due to 2019–20 COVID pandemic-related shortages.

== See also ==
- Two-balloon experiment
- Charles Hederer, inventor of the pulmoventilateur
- Rocking bed
