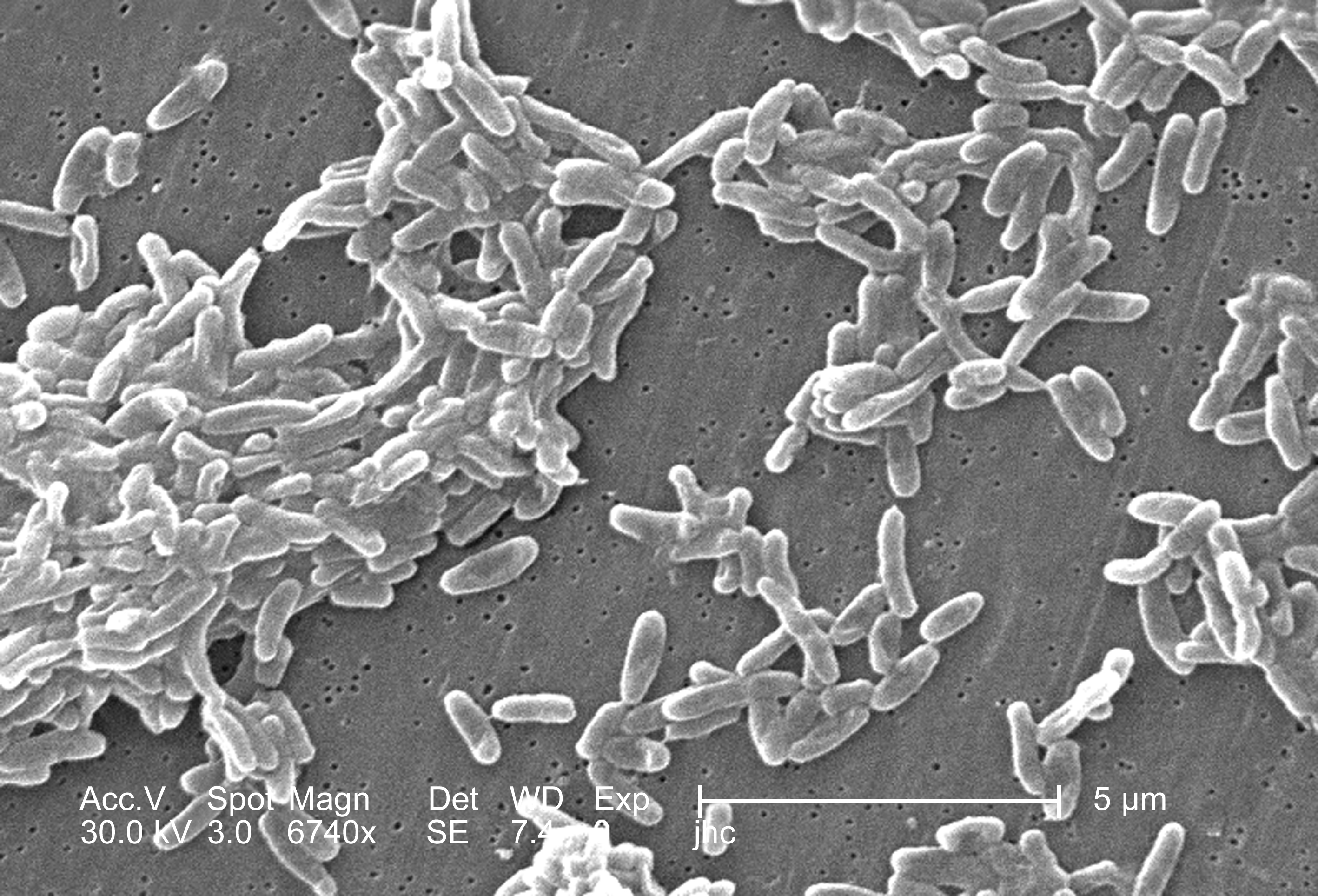

Scientific classification
- Domain: Bacteria
- Kingdom: Pseudomonadati
- Phylum: Pseudomonadota
- Class: Betaproteobacteria
- Order: Burkholderiales
- Family: Burkholderiaceae
- Genus: Ralstonia
- Species: R. mannitolilytica

Binomial name
- Ralstonia mannitolilytica corrig. De Baere et al. 2001

Synonyms
- Ralstonia mannitolytica De baere et al. 2001; Pseudomonas thomasii Phillips et al. 1972

= Ralstonia mannitolilytica =

Species of bacterium

Ralstonia mannitolilytica is a Gram-negative soil bacterium. Pseudomonas thomasii and Ralstonia pickettii biovar 3/thomasii are synonyms.

Ralstonia mannitolilytica has been implicated as an opportunistic pathogen in hospital-acquired infections, including a 1976 United Kingdom outbreak due to a contaminated distilled water supply, a 1989 outbreak in Taiwan caused by contaminated 0.9% sodium chloride solution, and a 2005 outbreak in children in the United States that was linked to contaminated Vapotherm respiratory gas humidification devices.
