= Eggplant production in China =

Agricultural production in Mainland China

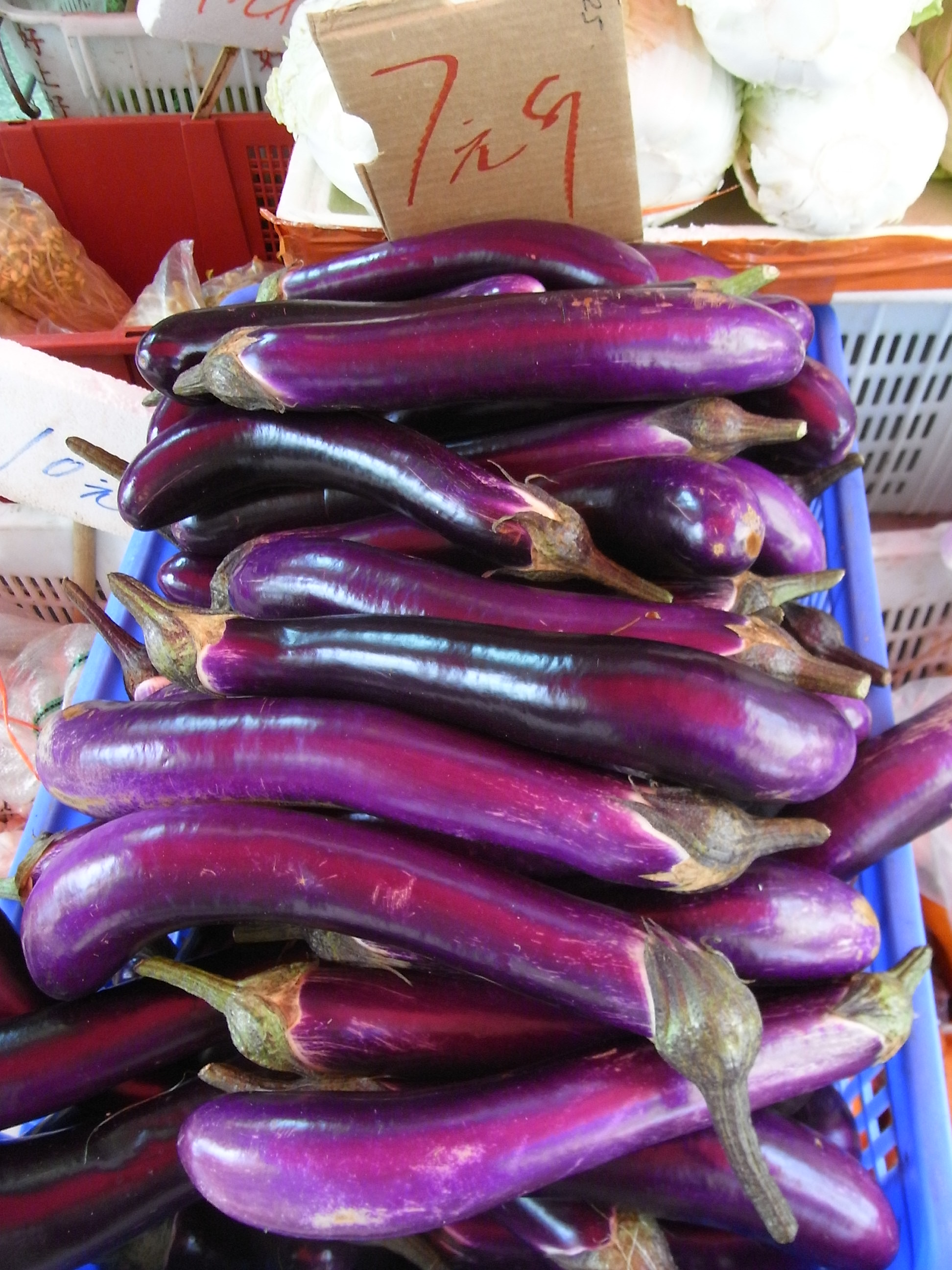
Eggplants on sale in Hong Kong

China is the world's leading producer and consumer of eggplants. The leading producers, after China, are India, Turkey, Japan, Egypt and Italy; a Mediterranean climate favors its production. China has produced eggplants since the 5th century BC for various reasons, not just for food. The eggplant is originally from India and reached coastal regions of mainland China first and then Taiwan; the long slender variety is the preferred one for cooking. Dark eggplant skins were historically used by aristocratic women to make black dye, which they often used to "stain their teeth to a black lustre". In Japan, this is called ohaguro.

In 2010, China produced 26,765,666 tonnes of eggplant, 59% of total world production. The industry is growing dramatically; 2008 figures report that China produced 17,532,681 tons in 2006. For some time the Chinese have been looking into innovative ways to increase yields, and in 1987, China established the first mechanized vegetable-seedling production farm in Beijing, known as "plug-seedling production". Eggplant has been produced in such a manner, as have tomato, cucumber, pepper, and melon, but are dependent upon plant rotation for better yield.

Chinese varieties of eggplants are characteristically long, slender, cylindrical and less purple than their American and Japanese counterparts with a greenish-purple calyx. The industry is dominated by small-scale farmers. Although production is dramatically increasing, eggplant farmers in China are often severely hampered by the pathogenic bacteria, Pseudomonas solanacearum, which infects their crops.

== Production techniques ==
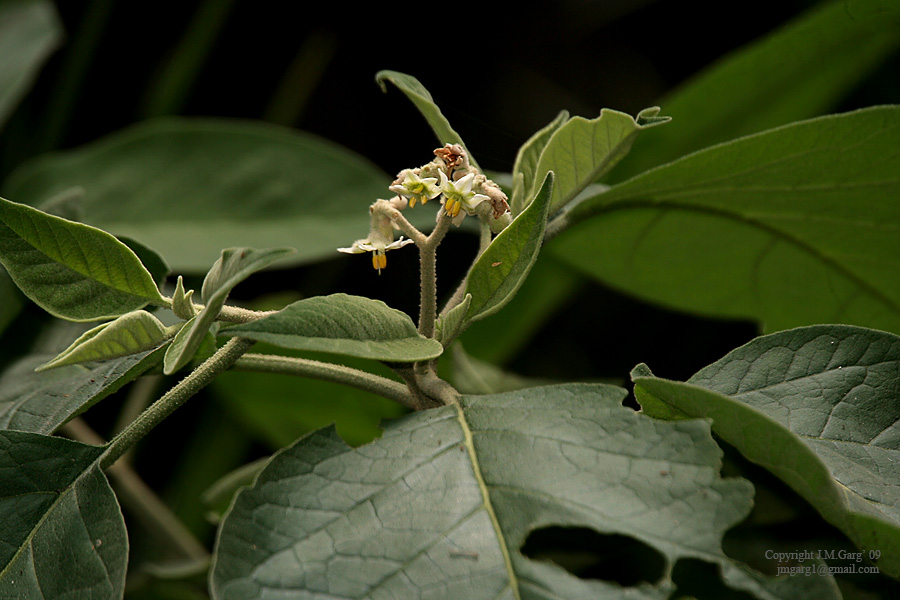
Chinese Solanum erianthum

The indigenous criollo species “soloman torbon” is the root stock which is grafted with the Chinese eggplant. It takes about 75 days for the grafting to be completed and to take out the seedling for transplanting; the yield from the grafted plant is generally about 30% more than from the non-grafted variety. Greenhouses in Taiwan and China produce two varieties of the grafted plants, Exporter 1 and Exporter 3, which are sold to the farmers at US$0.05 (2lps) per grafted plant without any profit margin, rotation of crops is widely practiced by the farmers; maize, Solanaceae and cucurbitaceae are the inter-crops used for crop rotation in the field. To control pests, barriers (wind breaks) of sorghum, king grass and sugar cane are created; nematodes is one of the pests which generally infests the agricultural lands, however the transplanted plants are resistant to this pest. In mainland China, planting of eggplant (as an open field vegetable) is done by plastic mulching and inter cropping with trellised cucurbit crops. Vine shades protect the crop during summer; however inter cropping is now less popular due to labor shortage.

Small quantities of eggplant are cubed and stewed in tomato sauce and then canned, but the majority of the crop is sold in the open market. Eggplant appetizers are also made with onions and other vegetables. It is also sold as frozen slices and frozen parmigiana in small glass jars.

== Statistics ==
According to FAO in 2010, production of eggplant is highly concentrated, with 90% of output coming from five countries. China is the top producer (58.55% of world output) and India is second (25.24%), followed by Egypt, Iran and Turkey. More than 4,000,000 acres (1,600,000 ha) are devoted to the cultivation of eggplant in the world.

Top ten eggplant/aubergine producers — 2010
Country	Production (Tonnes)	Percentage of World Total	Footnote
People's Republic of China	24,501,936	58.55	F
India	10,563,000	25.24	
Egypt	1,229,790	2.94	F
Iran	888,500	2.12	F
Turkey	849,998	2.03	
Indonesia	482,305	1.15	F
Iraq	387,435	0.93	F
Japan	330,100	0.79	F
Italy	302,551	0.72	
Philippines	208,252	0.50	
World	41,840,989		A
No symbol = official figure, P = official figure, F = FAO estimate, * = Unofficial/Semi-official/mirror data, C = Calculated figure A = Aggregate (may include official, semi-official or estimates); Source: UN Food and Agriculture Organization (FAO)
