= Vapotherm =

Medical device manufacturer

Vapotherm, Inc.
- Industry: Medical devices
- Founded: January 1, 1999 in Stevensville, MD, U.S.
- Founders: Bill Niland; Jun Cortez
- Headquarters: Exeter, New Hampshire, U.S
- Area served: Worldwide
- Brands: HVT 2.0®; Precision Flow®; Precision Flow Heliox®; Flowrest®
- Number of employees: 116 (2015)
- Website: vapotherm.com

Vapotherm Inc. Is a corporation based in Exeter, New Hampshire that was founded in 1999 as a medical device manufacturer after creating the first heated and humidified high flow therapy nasal cannula system.

== Vapotherm Precision Flow ==
In 2009, Vapotherm released a new flagship product replacing the Vapotherm 2000i (that had been recalled in 2005, and then re-approved for use in the market in 2006); boasting a completely integrated electronic flow meter and electronic blender, as well as an internal oxygen analyzer. The Precision Flow is currently Vapotherm's flagship capital unit and is the premier medical device for providing high flow therapy.

=== Precision Flow Heliox ===
Through an agreement with Praxair, Vapotherm provides a Precision Flow model specially calibrated specifically for 80:20 heliox gas for use in patients who may benefit from heliox therapy.

== Vapotherm Q50 Compressor ==
In November 2015 Vapotherm announced its own model of medical air compressor, specifically to be used with their flagship Precision Flow device.

== Vapotherm 2000i ==
=== Recall controversy ===
In 2005, contaminated Vapotherm 2000i respiratory gas humidification devices were associated with an outbreak of Ralstonia mannitolilytica bacteria in children in the United States. Vapotherm issued a recall of all 2000i devices on 13 October 2005. Vapotherm worked with the CDC and FDA to revise the operating manual and reduce risk to patients, and the 2000i was reintroduced on 1 February 2007.
