= Heated humidified high-flow therapy =

Respiratory support method

High-flow therapy
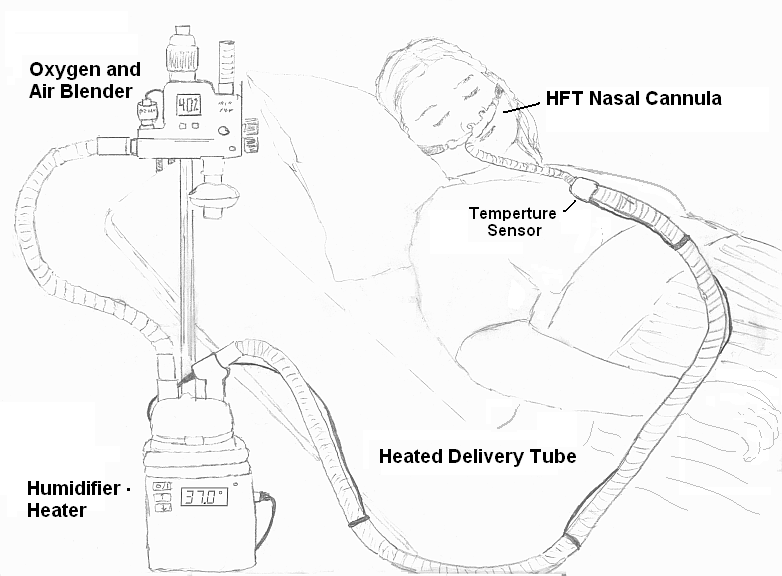
- Illustration of a patient using HFT device
- Other names: High flow nasal cannula
- ICD-10-PCS: Z99.81

Heated humidified high-flow therapy, often simply called high flow therapy, is a medical treatment providing respiratory support by delivering a flow of oxygen of up to 60 liters per minute to a patient through a large-bore or high-flow nasal cannula. Primarily studied in neonates, it has also been found effective in some adults to treat hypoxemia and work of breathing issues. The key components of it are a gas blender, heated humidifier, heated circuit, and cannula.

== History ==
The development of heated humidified high flow started in 1999 with Vapotherm introducing the concept of high flow use with race horses.

High flow was approved by the U.S. Food and Drug Administration in the early 2000s and used as an alternative to positive airway pressure for treatment of apnea of prematurity in neonates. The term high flow is relative to the size of the patient which is why the flow rate used in children is done by weight as just a few liters can meet the inspiratory demands of a neonate unlike in adults It has since become popular for use in adults for respiratory failure

== Mechanism ==
The traditional low flow system used for medical gas delivery is the Nasal cannula which is limited to the delivery of 1–6 L/min of oxygen or up to 15 L/min in certain types. This is because even with quiet breathing, the inspiratory flow rate at the nares of an adult usually exceeds 30 L/min. Therefore, the oxygen provided is diluted with room air during inspiration. Being a high flow system means that it meets or exceeds the flow demands of the patient.

=== Oxygenation ===
Since it is a high flow system, it is able to maintain the wearers fraction of inhaled oxygen (FiO2) at the set rate because they shouldn't be entraining ambient air. However, this may not be the case in patients who are poorly compliant with the therapy and are actively breathing through their mouth.

=== Ventilation ===
The flow can wash out some of the dead space in the upper airway. This can reduce slightly the amount of carbon dioxide rebreathed.

There is a correlation of the flow rate to mean airway pressure and in some subjects there has been an increase in lung volumes and decrease in respiratory rate. However, positive end expiratory pressure has only been measured at less 3 cmH2O meaning it is not able to provide close to what a closed ventilatory system could provide. In neonates it has been found, however, with a good fit and mouth closed, it can provide end expiratory pressure comparable to nasal continuous positive airway pressure.

=== Humidification ===
The higher the flow, the more important proper humidification and heating of the flow becomes to prevent tissue irritation and mucous drying. It has been found that long term use of flows of 20-25 L/min can help reduce symptoms of chronic obstructive pulmonary disease. This is because, heat and humidity help mucociliary clearance. This is the reason why high-flow therapy is assumed to help with mucus clearance better than other less humidified methodologies.

== Medical use ==
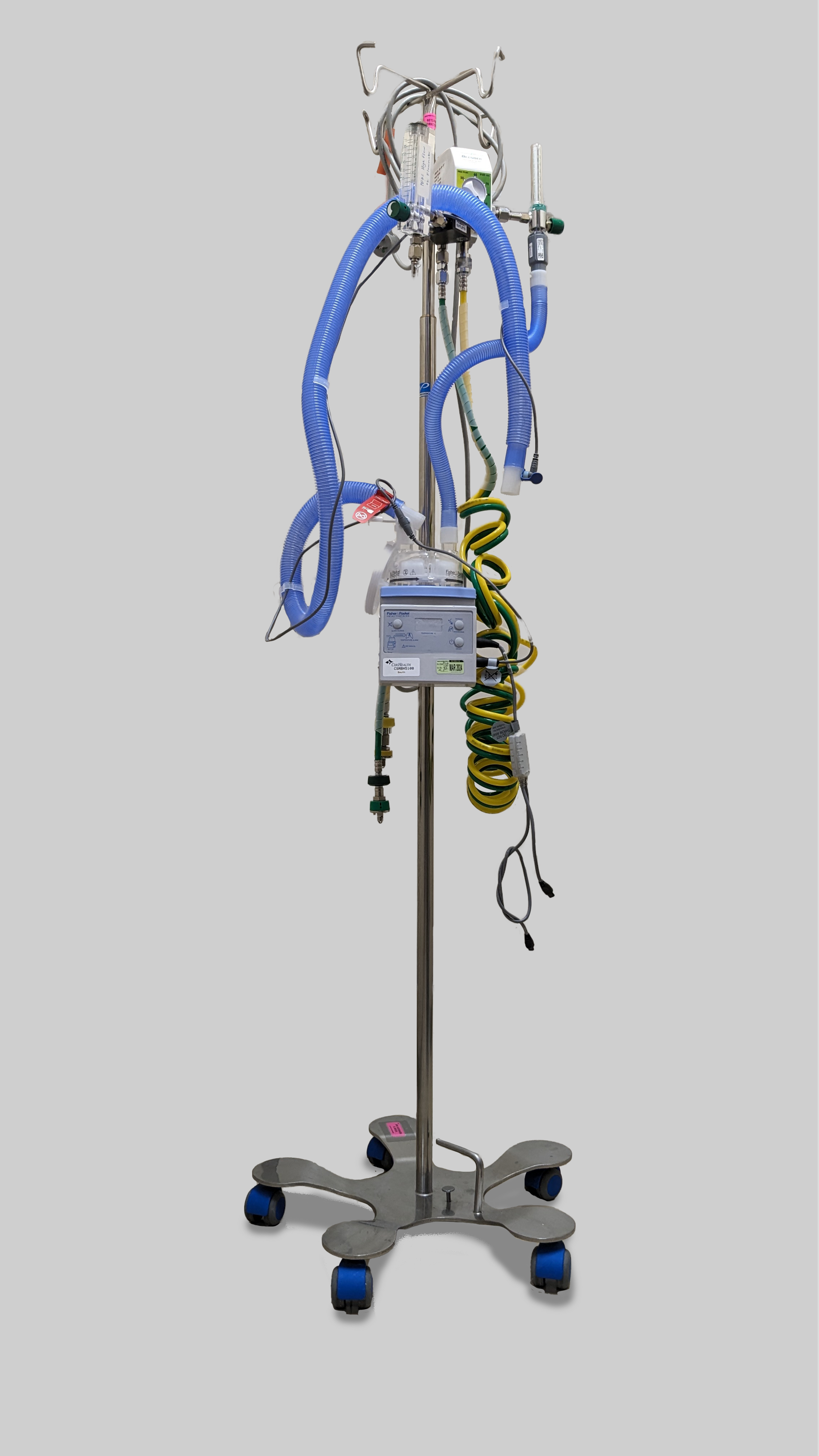

High-flow therapy is useful in patients that are spontaneously breathing but are in some type of respiratory failure. These are hypoxemic and certain cases of hypercapnic respiratory failure stemming from exacerbations of asthma and chronic obstructive pulmonary disease, bronchiolitis, pneumonia, and congestive heart failure are all possible situations where high-flow therapy may be indicated.

=== Newborn babies ===
High-flow therapy has shown to be useful in neonatal intensive care settings for premature infants with Infant respiratory distress syndrome, as it prevents many infants from needing more invasive ventilatory treatments.

Due to the decreased stress of effort needed to breathe, the neonatal body is able to spend more time utilizing metabolic efforts elsewhere, which causes decreased days on a mechanical ventilator, faster weight gain, and overall decreased hospital stay entirely.

High-flow therapy has been successfully implemented in infants and older children. The cannula improves the respiratory distress, the oxygen saturation, and the patient's comfort. Its mechanism of action is the application of mild positive airway pressure and lung volume recruitment.

=== Hypoxemic respiratory failure ===
In high-flow therapy, clinicians can deliver higher FiO_{2} than is possible with typical oxygen delivery therapy without the use of a non-rebreather mask or tracheal intubation. Some patients requiring respiratory support for bronchospasm benefit using air delivered by high-flow therapy without additional oxygen. Patients can speak during use of high-flow therapy. As this is a non-invasive therapy, it avoids the risk of ventilator-associated pneumonia.

Use of nasal high flow in acute hypoxemic respiratory failure does not affect mortality or length of stay either in hospital or in the intensive care unit. It can however reduce the need for tracheal intubation and escalation of oxygenation and respiratory support.

=== Hypercapnic respiratory failure ===
Stable patients with hypercapnia on high-flow therapy have been found to have their carbon dioxide levels decrease similar amounts to noninvasive treatment, but evidence is still limited as to its efficacy and currently the practice guideline is still to use noninvasive ventilation for those with exacerbations of chronic obstructive pulmonary disease and acidosis.

=== Other uses ===
Heated humidified high-flow therapy has been used in spontaneously breathing patients with during general anesthesia to facilitate surgery for airway obstruction.

High flow therapy is useful in the treatment of sleep apnea.
