= Ralstonia pseudosolanacearum =

Scientific classification
- Domain: Bacteria
- Kingdom: Pseudomonadati
- Phylum: Pseudomonadota
- Class: Betaproteobacteria
- Order: Burkholderiales
- Family: Burkholderiaceae
- Genus: Ralstonia
- Species: R. pseudosolanacearum

Binomial name
- Ralstonia pseudosolanacearum Safni et al. 2014

Species of bacterium

Ralstonia pseudosolanacearum is a soil-borne bacterium. It is a vascular phytopathogen that infects host plants through the root system causing wilting disease that causes loss in a wide range of crops. R. pseudosolanacearum is Gram negative and was originally identified as Ralstonia solanacearum, however, in 2014 Safni et al. proposed a taxonomic revision of the Ralstonia solanacearum species complex to reclassify phylotype strains, including R. pseudosolanacearum (R. solanacearum Phylotypes I and III).

R. pseudosolanacearum has been reported in a wide variety of crops including ornamental roses (Rosa sp.), tomatoes (Solanum lycopersicum), sweet peppers (Capsicum annum) and eggplant (Solanum melongena). Recent studies have found significant differences in disease severity influenced by higher temperatures (28°C) indicating temperature may be a virulence factor upon host colonization. The same study also reported wound inoculation resulted in higher disease severity regardless of temperatures tested (20°C -vs- 28°C) in addition to the potential implications of latent infections.

== Genetics (Strain Tg03) ==
- Median GC content: 66.9327%
- Genome size (Mp): 5.75905
- Strain Tg03 Genome size (genes): 5463
- NCBI Accession number: GCA_003725665.1

== Methods of detection ==
Diagnostic procedures using conventional PCR identification have been established due to the detrimental effects this bacterial pathogen can have. Plants infected by phylotype I have been shown to exhibit wilt, necrosis of the stem and visible internal vascular browning. Due to the severity of bacterial wilt in plants, methods of detecting R. pseudosolanacearum concentrations within drain water have been developed.

== Virulence studies ==
Studies have found that light plays an important role to the colonization of Ralstonia pseudosolanacearum in tomato plants.
