= Ralstonia syzygii =

Scientific classification
- Domain: Bacteria
- Kingdom: Pseudomonadati
- Phylum: Pseudomonadota
- Class: Betaproteobacteria
- Order: Burkholderiales
- Family: Burkholderiaceae
- Genus: Ralstonia
- Species: R. syzygii

Binomial name
- Ralstonia syzygii (Roberts et al. 1990); Vaneechoutte et al. 2004

Synonyms
- Pseudomonas syzygii Roberts et al. 1990

Species of bacterium

Ralstonia syzygii is a species of bacteria in the family Burkholderiaceae. This bacterium is the plant pathogen responsible for Sumatra disease that affects the cloves (Syzygium) in Indonesia. It is transmitted by Hemiptera insects of the spittle group (superfamily Cercopoidea).

This species is classified in the species complex Ralstonia solanacearum, which also includes certain Asian strains of R. solanacearum, a soil bacterium which infects many species of plants, and bacteria from the blood disease of banana (BDB). These three plant pathogenic bacteria are very closely related, despite significant differences biologically, and are grouped in the subgroup phylotype IV species complex Ralstonia solanacearum.
