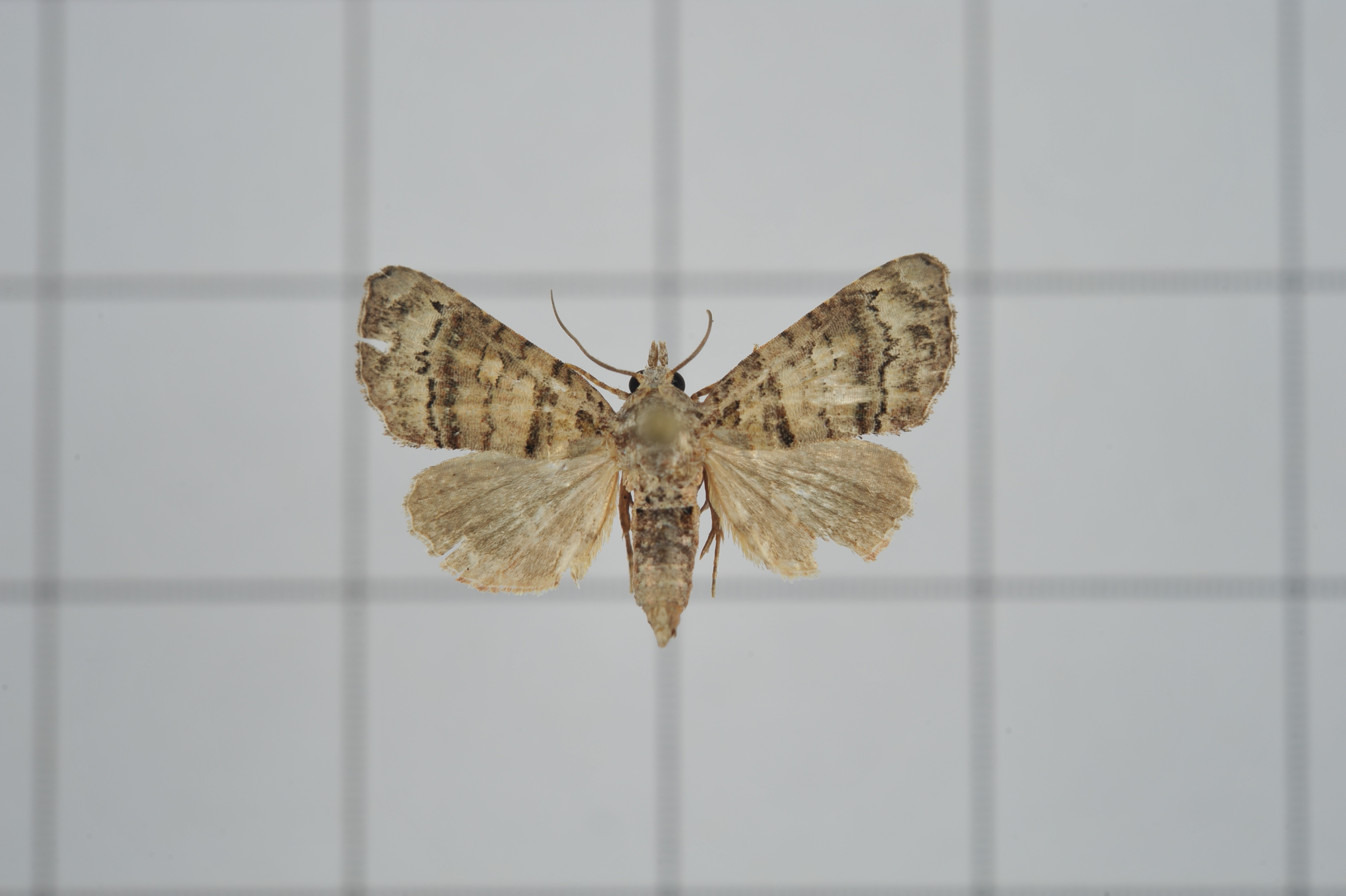

Scientific classification
- Kingdom: Animalia
- Phylum: Arthropoda
- Class: Insecta
- Order: Lepidoptera
- Superfamily: Noctuoidea
- Family: Euteliidae
- Genus: Chlumetia
- Species: C. transversa

Binomial name
- Chlumetia transversa (Walker, 1863)

Synonyms
- Nachaba transversa Walker, 1863; Chlumetia guttiventris Walker, [1866] 1865; Chlumetia guangxiensis Wu & Zhu, 1981

= Chlumetia transversa =

Species of moth

Chlumetia transversa, the mango shoot borer, is a moth of the family Euteliidae. The species was first described by Francis Walker in 1863. It is a widely distributed across Indo-Australian tropical countries far east to Solomon Islands.

== Distribution ==
It is well distributed in Indo-Australian tropical countries of India, Pakistan, Sri Lanka, Bangladesh towards China, Korea, and Indonesia, Malaysia, Thailand, Andaman Islands, Nicobar Islands and Solomon Islands.

== Description ==
Adult wingspan is 1.5 cm. Forewings shining gray, whereas hindwings light gray. Submarginal band of forewing is broken. Reniform open anteriorly. Dark grayish subbasal shading visible. Valves of male genitalia slender and curved upwards. Short uncus is broad and polygonal. Caterpillar has dull violaceous dorsum and greenish ventrum. Head brownish, which becomes testaceous in late instars. Spiracles narrow. Legs and prolegs short. Final instar is dark pink.

== Pest attack ==
The caterpillar is a serious pest of Mangifera indica. It eats young leaves and then bores into the midrib and terminal shoots. Heavy infestation results in leaf abscission and wilting of shoots. Other larval host plants include Litchi chinensis, Buchanania, Mangifera foetida and Solanum erianthum.

== Control ==
Pests can be controlled by light traps, pheromone traps, hand picking, pruning, or application of several pesticides such as carbaryl, quinalphos, monocrotophos, fenvalerate or cypermethrin.

Larvae of the parasitoid Megaselia chlumetiae is known to parasitize shoot borer caterpillars by laying eggs on the integument of the caterpillar. Emerged fly larvae then enter the caterpillar and feed on its internal tissues. Finally the pupation occurs within the dead caterpillar.

== Gallery ==
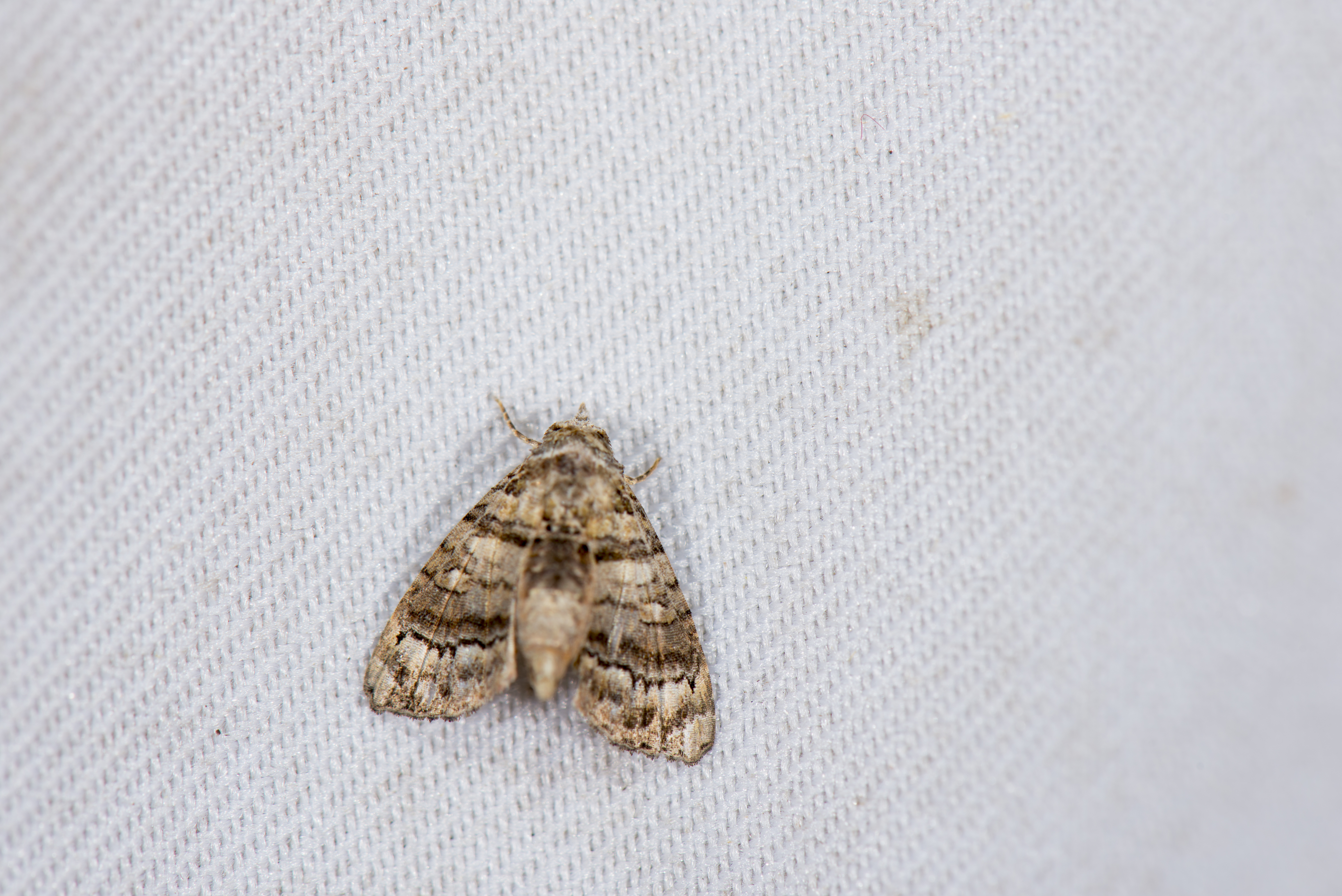

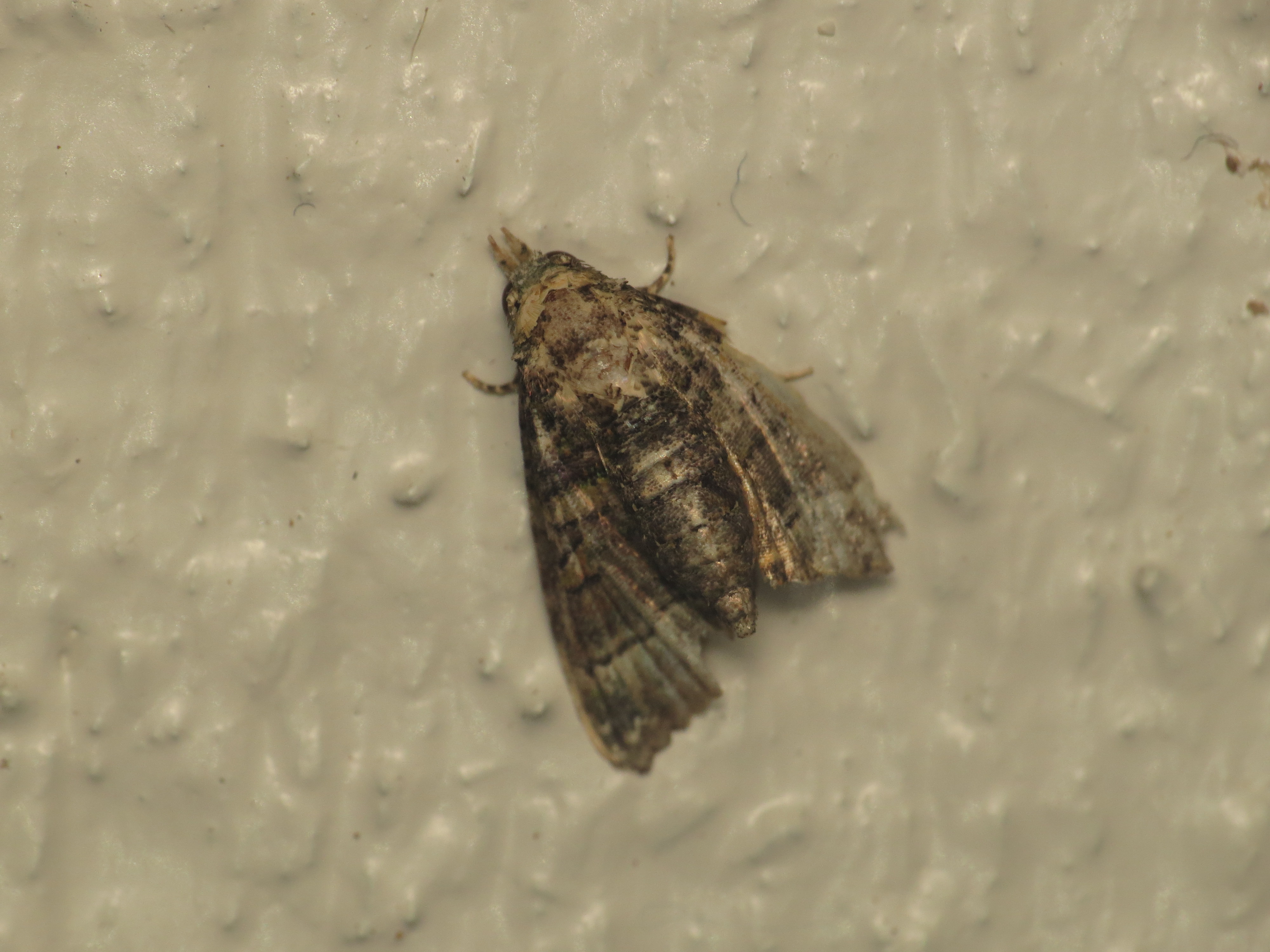

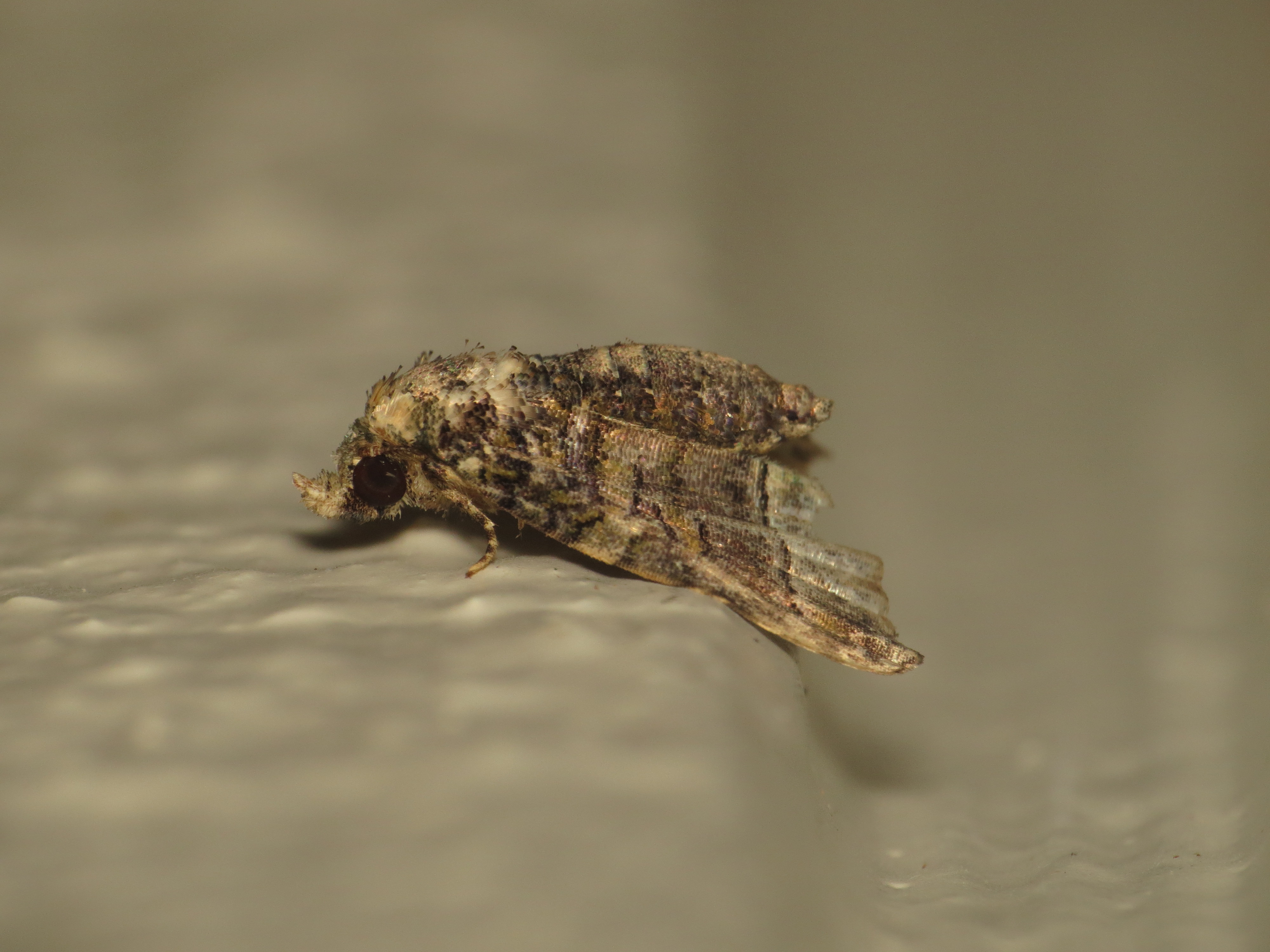
