= Ralstonia =

Scientific classification
- Domain: Bacteria
- Kingdom: Pseudomonadati
- Phylum: Pseudomonadota
- Class: Betaproteobacteria
- Order: Burkholderiales
- Family: Burkholderiaceae
- Genus: Ralstonia; Yabuuchi et al. 1996

Species
- Ralstonia insidiosa Ralstonia mannitolilytica Ralstonia pickettii Ralstonia pseudosolanacearum Ralstonia solanacearum Ralstonia syzygii

Genus of bacteria

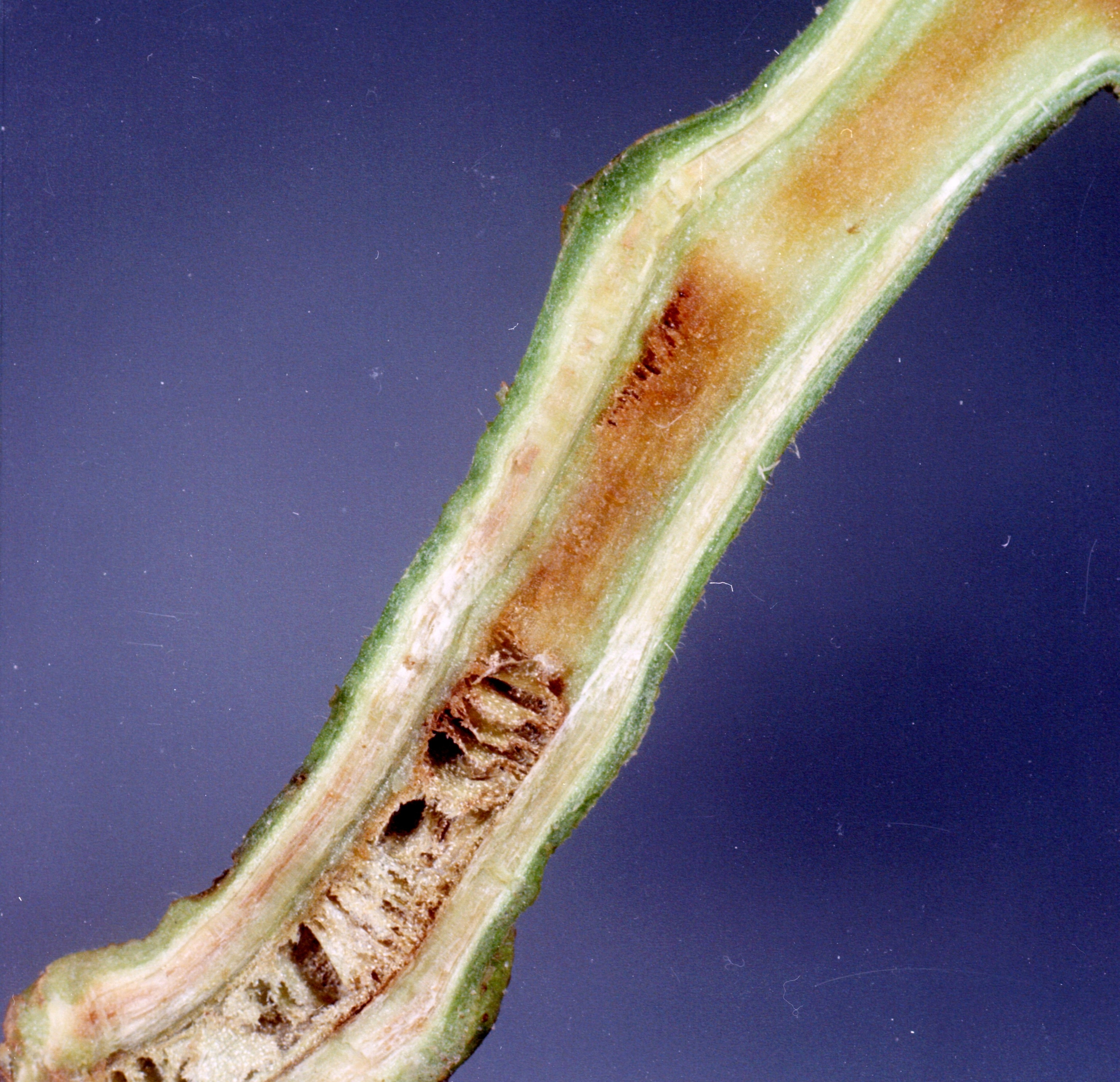
Symptoms of southern bacterial wilt in tomato caused by Ralstonia solanacearum

Ralstonia is a genus of bacteria, previously included in the genus Pseudomonas. It is named after the American bacteriologist Ericka Ralston. While in graduate school at the University of California at Berkeley, Ralston identified 20 strains of Pseudomonas which formed a phenotypical homologous group, and named them Pseudomonas pickettii, after M.J. Pickett, from whom she had received the strains. Later, P. pickettii was transferred to the new genus Ralstonia, along with several other species.

== Genomics ==
- Ralstonia Genome Projects (from Genomes OnLine Database)
- Comparative Analysis of Ralstonia Genomes (at DOE's IMG system)

Ralstonia has also been identified as a common contaminant of DNA extraction kit or PCR reagents, which may lead to its erroneous appearance in microbiota or metagenomic datasets. Ralstonia is one of the most common pathogens for causing nosocomial infections in immunocompromised patients. Those receiving mechanical ventilation are twelve times more likely of developing the infection than those not on a mechanical ventilator.

== Ecology ==
Ralstonia has been identified in the milk of water deer, reindeer and goats. Ralstonia pickettii, Ralstonia insidiosa and Ralstonia mannitolilytica have been found in many different environments including in clinical situations where they can act as pathogens. Ralstonia has been also reported as responsible for nosocomial outbreaks of bloodstream infections, linked to the contamination of medication vials.

== Outbreaks ==
On 28 November 2023 an outbreak of Ralstonia was reported in hospitals across Australia from an apparent contamination of Saline products imported from overseas. There are 43 suspected cases of infection, and one death of an elderly patient in the state of Queensland. The outbreak led the Therapeutic Goods Administration to issue an alert, and remove two saline products from Australian private and public hospitals.
