= Apnea of prematurity =

Temporary cessation of breathing in premature infants

- Specialty: Pediatrics
- Symptoms: Apnea, bradycardia, intermittent hypoxemia
- Usual onset: Prematurity, particularly before 34 weeks' gestation
- Types: Central apnea, obstructive apnea, mixed apnea
- Causes: Developmental immaturity of respiratory control and upper airway regulation
- Prognosis: Resolves with increasing age
- Frequency: Nearly all infants born at or before 28 weeks' gestation; about 20% at 34 weeks

Apnea of prematurity (AOP) is a disorder in infants who are preterm that is defined as cessation of breathing (apnea) that lasts for more than 20 seconds or is accompanied by hypoxia or bradycardia. Apnea of prematurity is often linked to earlier prematurity (younger gestational age).

Apnea is traditionally classified as either obstructive, central, or mixed:

- Obstructive apnea may occur when the infant's neck is hyperflexed or conversely, hyperextended. It may also occur due to low pharyngeal muscle tone or to inflammation of the soft tissues, which can block the flow of air though the pharynx and vocal cords.
- Central apnea occurs when there is a lack of respiratory effort. This may result from central nervous system immaturity, or from the effects of medications or illness.
- Mixed apnea involves elements of both obstructive and central apnea. Many episodes of apnea of prematurity may start as either obstructive or central, but then involve elements of both, becoming mixed in nature.

Over 50% of infants who are born preterm are estimated to be affected by apnea of prematurity. Infants who are born weighing less than 1000 g have close to a 100% risk of being affected by apnea of prematurity. Most premature infants are affected by 'central' apnea due to the developmental stage of their respiratory tract.

Apnea of prematurity can increase the risk of chronic health conditions including retinopathy and increases the risk of problems with the infant's neurological development. Apnea lasting more than 60 seconds may result in death or disability.

The main treatment for apnea of prematurity has been pharmaceutical treatment with methylxanthines that have a mechanism of action of bronchodilation and a stimulant of the respiratory system to promote spontaneous breathing. Caffeine and theophylline are the common medications used.

== Pathophysiology ==
Ventilatory drive is primarily dependent on response to increased levels of carbon dioxide (CO_{2}) and acid in the blood. A secondary stimulus is hypoxia. Responses to these stimuli are impaired in premature infants due to immaturity of specialized regions of the brain that sense these changes. In addition, premature infants have an exaggerated response to laryngeal stimulation (a normal reflex that closes the airway as a protective measure).

== Diagnosis ==
Apnea of prematurity can be readily identified from other forms of infant apnea such as obstructive apnea, hypoventilation syndromes, breathing regulation issues during feeding, and reflux associated apnea with an infant pneumogram or infant apnea/sleep study.

It has been reported that the incidence of neonatal apnea happens in almost all infants with gestational age of less than 29 weeks or the birth weight of less than 1000g.

== Treatment ==
Interventions for apnea of prematurity include positioning, medications, and respiratory support. Preventive measures include maintaining a position that keeps the airway open, such as avoiding excessive bending or extension of the neck. In some cases, prone positioning is considered. A stable room temperature may be maintained, as fluctuations in temperature can trigger episodes of apnea. Measures to keep the nasal passages open include limiting nasal suctioning, using heated humidified air to reduce crusting of secretions, and selecting nasal cannulas that are appropriately sized. Supplemental oxygen may be used to prevent hypoxia and maintain an oxygen saturation between 88% and 94%.

=== Medications ===
Methylxanthines (theophylline and caffeine) have been used for almost three decades to treat apnea of prematurity. These medications are thought to help by stimulating the preterm infant's respiratory drive, increasing activity of the diaphragm muscles, and by bronchodilation. There is some evidence that these medications can reduce to need for mechanical ventilation in preterm infants. There is no clear evidence to determine which type of methylxanthine formulation is more effective for preterm infants. The long term effects of this treatment approach has not been well studied. There is also not a lot of evidence to support the most effective way to treat very young preterm infants such as those who are born earlier than 28 weeks of gestational age.

=== Respiratory support ===
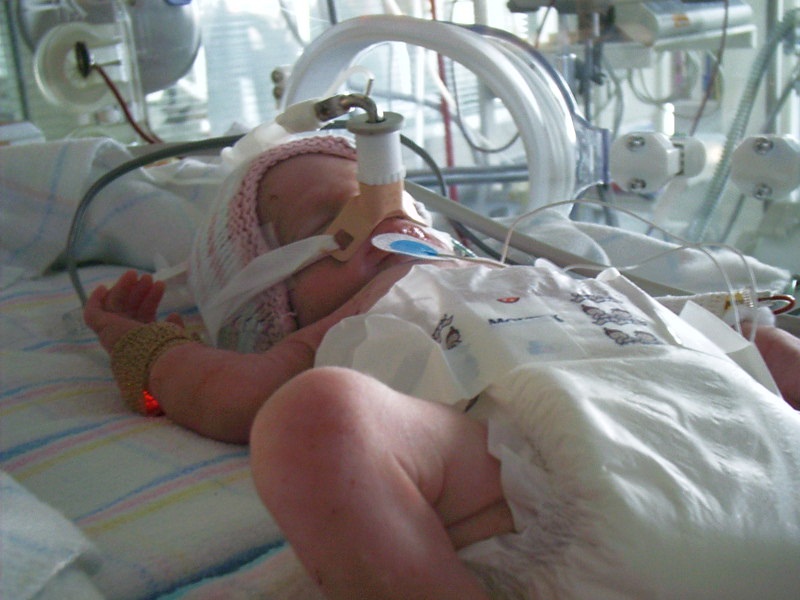
Premature infant receiving nasal continuous positive airway pressure

Noninvasive respiratory support can help reduce episodes of apnea in premature infants by using air pressure to splint the airway open during breathing. This support can reduce atelectasis, improve oxygen levels in the blood, decrease the number of apneic episodes, and increase the likelihood of successful breathing tube removal (extubation). Options for noninvasive respiratory support include nasal cannula, nasal continuous positive airway pressure (CPAP), and nasal intermittent positive pressure ventilation (NIPPV). CPAP provides a steady flow of air pressure that helps keep the airways open and improves oxygen levels. Nasal cannulas can also generate positive airway pressure, but the pressure varies. NIPPV is an enhanced version of CPAP that delivers periodic breaths at a specific pressure.

=== Monitoring ===
Because apnea of prematurity is common among preterm infants born before 35 weeks’ gestation, these newborns are typically monitored for apnea, bradycardia, and oxygen desaturation. Monitoring may involve pulse oximetry to measure oxygen saturation, continuous electrocardiography to measure heart rate, and impedance-based respiratory monitoring to detect chest movement. Because impedance monitoring alone is known to frequently miss cases of obstructive apnea, it is often paired with capnography which measures exhaled carbon dioxide. Central apnea can be detected by the absence of respiratory movements. Obstructive apnea can be detected by the absence of airflow despite continued respiratory effort.

Although discharge criteria vary, many centers observe infants for a 5-7 day period without events related to apnea of prematurity before discharging home. After such an event-free period, the risk of a subsequent clinically significant cardiorespiratory event is very low. Therefore, cardiorespiratory monitoring at home is generally unnecessary for infants who are otherwise ready for discharge.

== Epidemiology ==
Apnea of prematurity occurs primarily in premature infants and is one of the most common diagnoses in neonatal intensive care units (NICUs). It affects nearly all infants born at or before 28 weeks’ gestation and becomes less common with increasing gestational age. Even at 34 weeks’ gestation, approximately 20% of infants experience episodes consistent with apnea of prematurity. The condition may persist up to 44 weeks’ postmenstrual age (gestational age at birth plus time since birth) before resolving as respiratory control matures.

== Outcomes ==
Apnea of prematurity usually resolves as the infant’s breathing control matures with age. The intermittent hypoxia caused by episodes of apnea is associated with retinopathy of prematurity, bronchopulmonary dysplasia, and airway hyperreactivity. Frequent episodes and delayed resolution of the condition are associated with neurodevelopmental impairment in early childhood, including visual and hearing deficits. Because apnea of prematurity occurs in the setting of prematurity, which is itself independently associated with many complications, the extent to which these outcomes are directly caused by apnea remains uncertain.
