= Chlumetia =

Scientific classification
- Kingdom: Animalia
- Phylum: Arthropoda
- Class: Insecta
- Order: Lepidoptera
- Superfamily: Noctuoidea
- Family: Euteliidae
- Genus: Chlumetia; Walker, [1866]

Genus of moths

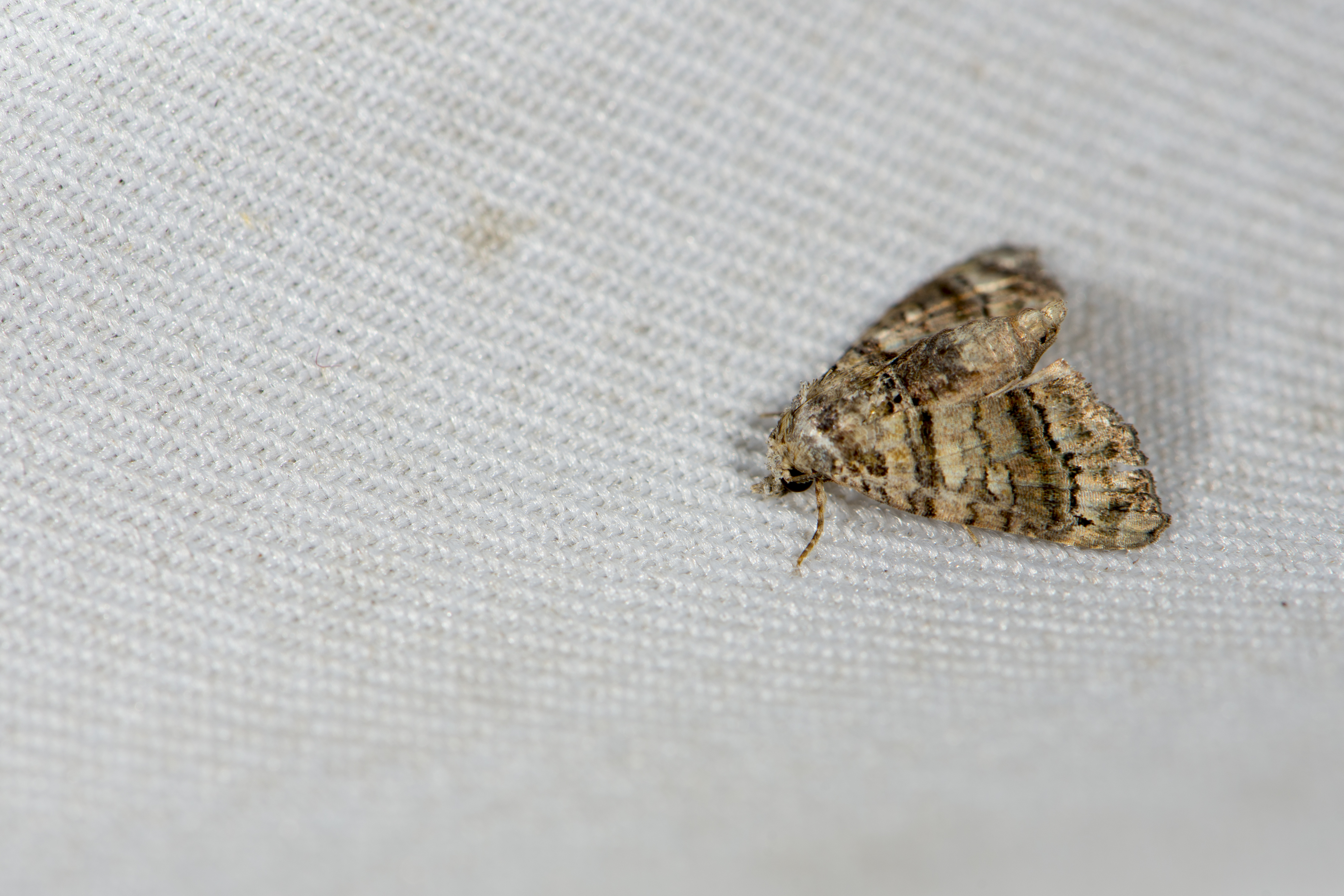
Chlumetia Transversa

Chlumetia is a genus of moths of the family Euteliidae. The genus was erected by Francis Walker in 1866.

== Description ==
Palpi with second joint reaching vertex of head and thick scales, where the third joint short. Antennae of male bipectinated. Thorax smoothly scaled. Abdomen with dorsal tufts. Tibia moderately hairy. Forewings with hardly a trace of raised buttons of scaled. Veins 8 and 9 anastomosing to for a short areole. Hindwing with veins 3,4,5 arise from lower angle of cell.

== Species ==
- Chlumetia albiapicata (Hampson, 1902) South Africa
- Chlumetia alternans Moore, 1882 Darjiling
- Chlumetia borbonica Guillermet, 1992 Reunion
- Chlumetia brevisigna Holloway, 1985 India, Sri Lanka, Singapore, Java, Philippines
- Chlumetia cana Hampson, 1912 Tanzania
- Chlumetia dulita Holloway, 1985 Borneo
- Chlumetia euryptera Hampson, 1912 New Guinea
- Chlumetia euthysticha (Turner, 1941) Borneo, Ternate, New Guinea, northern Queensland, Solomons
- Chlumetia griseapicata Laporte, 1970 Ivory Coast
- Chlumetia hampsoni (Bethune-Baker, 1906) New Guinea
- Chlumetia insularis Prout, 1927 Sao Tome
- Chlumetia kinabalua Holloway, 1985 Borneo
- Chlumetia lichenosa (Hampson, 1902) Angola, South Africa, Zimbabwe
- Chlumetia malaysiana Holloway, 1985 Peninsular Malaysia
- Chlumetia melanesiana Holloway, 1985 Solomons
- Chlumetia montalbana Holloway, 1985 Philippines
- Chlumetia multilineata Wileman & West, 1928 Philippines
- Chlumetia polymorpha Hampson, 1920 South Africa, Zimbabwe
- Chlumetia postrubra Holloway, 1985 Peninsular Malaysia, Borneo, Sulawesi
- Chlumetia transversa (Walker, 1863) Indo-Australian tropics to the Solomons
- Chlumetia trisigna Holloway, 1985 Bali
