= Chlumetia borbonica =

Scientific classification
- Domain: Eukaryota
- Kingdom: Animalia
- Phylum: Arthropoda
- Class: Insecta
- Order: Lepidoptera
- Superfamily: Noctuoidea
- Family: Euteliidae
- Genus: Chlumetia
- Species: C. borbonica

Binomial name
- Chlumetia borbonica Guillermet, 1992

Species of moth

Chlumetia borbonica is a moth of the family Euteliidae. It is known from Réunion, where it is found in low and medium altitudes and Madagascar.

It has a wingspan of approx. 22 mm.

The larvae feed on Syzgium cumini and Eucalyptus robusta of the family Myrtaceae.
