= Ralstonia insidiosa =

Scientific classification
- Domain: Bacteria
- Kingdom: Pseudomonadati
- Phylum: Pseudomonadota
- Class: Betaproteobacteria
- Order: Burkholderiales
- Family: Burkholderiaceae
- Genus: Ralstonia
- Species: R. insidiosa

Binomial name
- Ralstonia insidiosa Coenye et al.. 2003

Species of bacterium

Ralstonia insidiosa is a Gram-negative, environmental bacterium. It has been shown to be pathogenic in immunocompromised patients in hospital settings. This bacterium is closely related to Ralstonia pickettii.
