= Nasal cannula =

Medical device to deliver supplemental oxygen

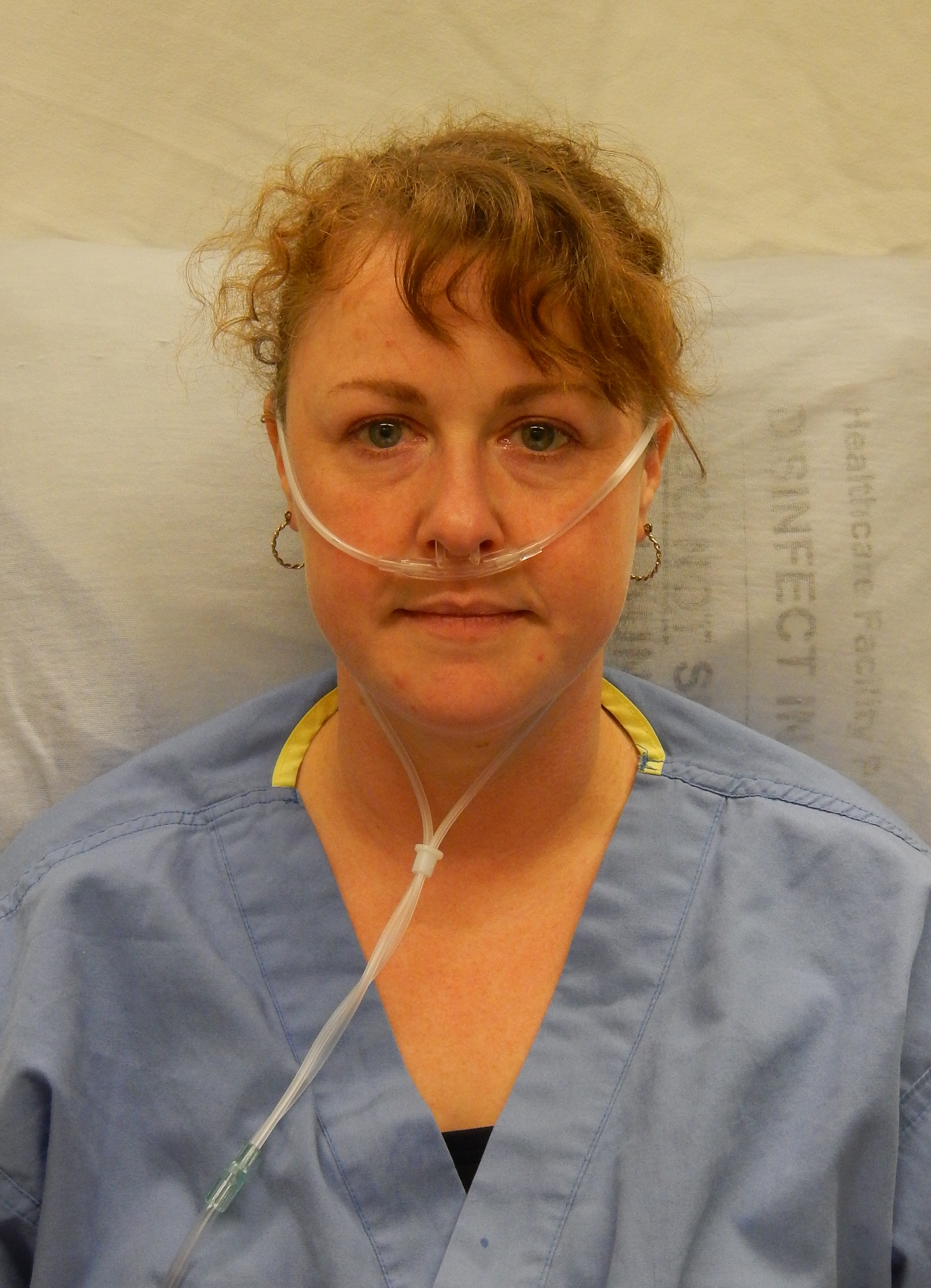
- Photograph of a patient wearing a nasal cannula
- ICD-10-PCS: A4615
- ICD-9: 93.90 93.99
- MeSH: D012121
- OPS-301 code: 8-71

The nasal cannula (NC), also known as nasoinhaler, is a device used to deliver supplemental oxygen or increased airflow to a patient or person in need of respiratory help. This device consists of a lightweight tube which on one end splits into two prongs which are placed in the nostrils curving toward the sinuses behind the nose, and from which a mixture of air and oxygen flows. The other end of the tube is connected to an oxygen supply such as a portable oxygen generator, or a wall connection in a hospital via a flowmeter. The cannula is generally attached to the patient by way of the tube hooking around the patient's ears or by an elastic headband, and the prongs curve toward the paranasal sinuses. The earliest, and most widely used form of adult nasal cannula carries 1–3 litres of oxygen per minute.

Cannulae with smaller prongs intended for infant or neonatal use can carry less than one litre per minute. Flow rates of up to 60 litres of air/oxygen per minute can be delivered through wider bore humidified nasal cannula.

The nasal cannula was invented by Wilfred Jones and patented in 1949 by his employer, BOC.

== Applications ==
=== Supplemental oxygen ===
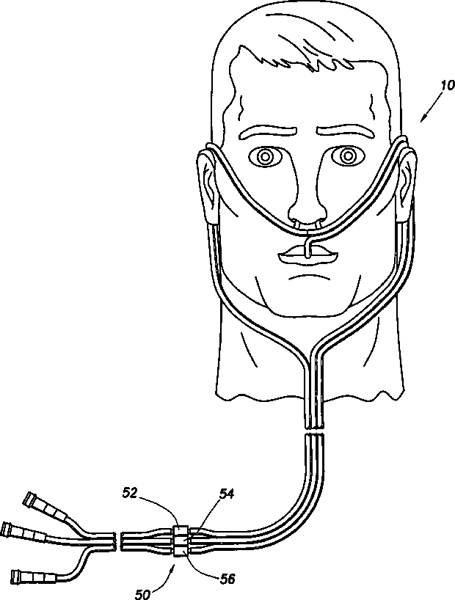
Nasal prongs

A nasal cannula is generally used wherever small amounts of supplemental oxygen are required, without rigid control of respiration, such as in oxygen therapy. Most cannulae can only provide oxygen at low flow rates—up to 5 litres per minute (L/min)—delivering an oxygen concentration of 28–44%. Rates above 5 L/min can result in discomfort to the patient, drying of the nasal passages, and possibly nose bleeds (epistaxis). Also with flow rates above 6 L/min, the laminar flow becomes turbulent and the oxygen therapy being delivered is only as effective as delivering 5–6 L/min.

The nasal cannula is often used in elderly patients or patients who can benefit from oxygen therapy but do not require it to self respirate. These patients do not need oxygen to the degree of wearing a non-rebreather mask. It is especially useful in those patients where vasoconstriction could negatively impact their condition, such as those suffering from strokes.

A nasal cannula may also be used by pilots and passengers in small, unpressurized aircraft that do not exceed certain altitudes. The cannula provides extra oxygen to compensate for the lower oxygen content available for breathing at the low ambient air pressures of high altitude, preventing hypoxia. Special aviation cannula systems are manufactured for this purpose.

Since the early 2000s, with the introduction of nasal cannula which uses heated humidification for respiratory gas humidification, flows above 6 LPM have become possible without the associated discomfort, and with the added benefit of improving mucociliary clearance.

=== Nasal high-flow therapy ===
High flows of an air/oxygen blend can be administered via a nasal cannula to accurately deliver high volume of oxygen therapy. Respiratory gas humidification allows the high flows to be delivered comfortably via the cannula. Nasal high-flow therapy can be used as an effective alternative to face mask oxygen and allows the patient to continue to talk, eat and drink while receiving the therapy. Definition: Non-invasive delivery of oxygen air mixture delivered via a nasal cannula at flows that exceed the patient's inspiratory flow demands with gas that has been optimally conditioned by warming and humidifying the gas to close to 100% relative humidity at body temperature.

== Reservoir cannula ==
A reservoir cannula is an oxygen conserving supplemental oxygen administration device which accumulates constant flow oxygen in a small reservoir below the nose during exhalation and delivers it in a bolus it at the beginning of the next inhalation, which ensures that most of it reaches the parts of the lung in which gas exchange occurs, and little is wasted in dead space.

=== Benefits ===
- Oxygen Conservation
- Improved oxygen delivery
- Potential for lower flow rates

== See also ==
- Oxygen tank – Storage vessel for oxygen
- Oxygen therapy – Use of oxygen as a medical treatment
- Oxygen mask – Interface between oxygen delivery system and human user
- Hyperbaric medicine, also known as Hyperbaric oxygen therapy – Medical treatment at raised ambient pressure
- Space suit – Garment worn to protect a human in space
- Oxygen tent – Canopy over a patient to provide supplemental oxygen
- Oxygen bar – Establishment that sells oxygen for on-site recreational use
