= Ralstonia pickettii =

Scientific classification
- Domain: Bacteria
- Kingdom: Pseudomonadati
- Phylum: Pseudomonadota
- Class: Betaproteobacteria
- Order: Burkholderiales
- Family: Burkholderiaceae
- Genus: Ralstonia
- Species: R. pickettii

Binomial name
- Ralstonia pickettii (Ralston et al. 1973); Yabuuchi et al. 1996

Synonyms
- Burkholderia pickettii (Ralston et al. 1973) Yabuuchi et al. 1993; Pseudomonas pickettii Ralston et al. 1973

Species of bacterium

Ralstonia pickettii is a Gram-negative, rod-shaped, soil bacterium. It was first isolated in 1973 and was initially classified in the Pseudomonas genus.

Ralstonia pickettii is a Betaproteobacteria species found in moist environments such as soils, rivers, and lakes. It has also been identified in biofilms in plastic water pipes. It is an oligotrophic organism, making it capable of surviving in areas with a very low concentration of nutrients. Several strains have shown an ability to survive in environments highly contaminated with metals. The ability to persist in these harsh conditions makes R. pickettii a candidate for bioremediation.

== Microbiology ==
Ralstonia pickettii is classified as a Gram negative, aerobic, nonfermentive bacillus.

R. pickettii favors temperatures of 30-37°C and grows slowly on primary isolation media such as MacConkey agar, 5% sheep blood agar and chocolate agar, and at least 72 hours of incubation may be required before colonies are visible. In general, R. pickettii is lysine decarboxylase negative, oxidase and catalase positive, however, some strains have proven to be catalase negative.

Species within the Ralstonia genus are difficult to distinguish using solely biochemical assays, however, 16S PCR has been proven to successfully distinguish between the different species.

== Clinical Relevance ==
Ralstonia pickettii and R. insidiosa are emerging pathogens in hospital settings. R. pickettii pathology does not follow an easy definition. Several hospitals have reported outbreaks—in particular, patients with cystic fibrosis and Crohn's disease have been shown to be infected with R. picketti. Of the 55 reported cases of such infection, the majority are due to contaminated solutions such as water, saline, and sterile drugs. These solutions are usually contaminated when the product is manufactured, because R. pickettii has the ability to pass through the 0.45 and 0.2 μm filters that are used to sterilize medicinal products. An outbreak of R. pickettii at a hospital in Queensland, Australia was reported in November 2023, and it is suspected to have caused the death of one patient through contaminated saline. In 2026, there were 90 deaths due to contaminated Fentanyl in Argentina related to R. pickettii.

There are currently no standard recommendations for the treatment of R. pickettii infections, although good results have been seen using a wide variety of antibiotics for treatment, including piperacillin-tazobactam, meropenem, ciprofloxacin and amikacin. The presence of two inducible beta-lactamases in the R. pickettii genome, blaOXA-60 and blaOXA-22, have been reported as a source of beta-lactam resistance, and an aminoglycoside acetyltransferase is responsible for the widespread resistance to aminoglycosides.
