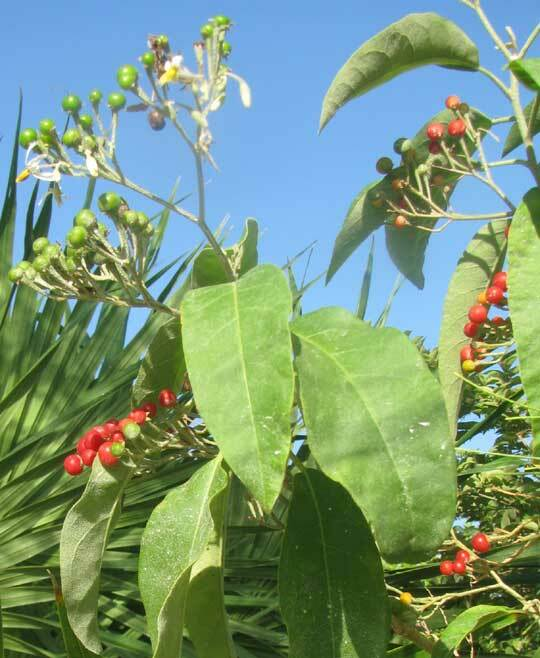

Scientific classification
- Kingdom: Plantae
- Clade: Tracheophytes
- Clade: Angiosperms
- Clade: Eudicots
- Clade: Asterids
- Order: Solanales
- Family: Solanaceae
- Genus: Solanum
- Species: S. donianum

Binomial name
- Solanum donianum Walp. 1844

Synonyms
- Solanum bahamense Mill. (1768); Solanum blodgettii Chapm (1860); Solanum verbascifolium L. (1753); Solanum verbascifolium Banks ex Dunal (1852)

= Solanum donianum =

Mullein nightshade

Species of flowering plant

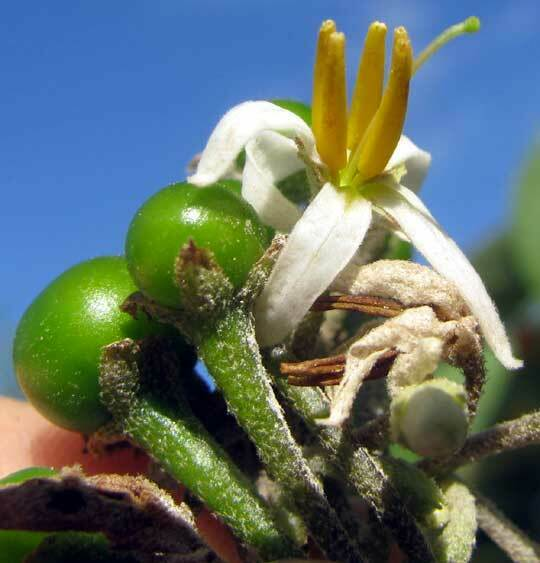
Flower and immature fruits
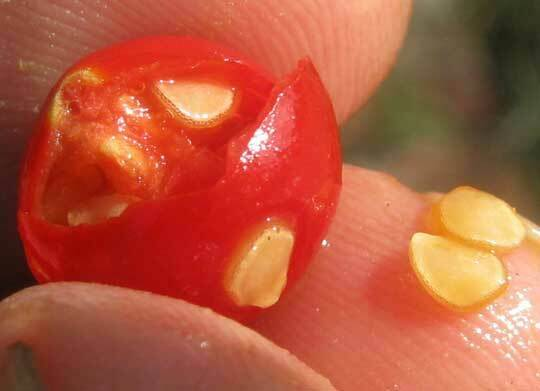
Fruit showing seeds

Solanum donianum, often known as the mullein nightshade, is a species of flowering plant in the nightshade, tomato or potato family, the Solanaceae.

== Description ==
The mullein nightshade is an erect shrub growing to 2.5 m (8 ft 2 in) tall. Young plant are sparsely armed with brownish, straight prickles up to 3 mm (0.12 in) long, but these may be absent on older plants. The plant's green parts are moderately to densely covered with branched "stellate" hairs. Leaves have petioles up to 3 cm (1.2 in) long, with the egg-shaped to elliptic blades developing no teeth or indentations along the margins; leaves are up to 5.5 cm (2.2 in) long.

Flowers are arranged in much-branched inflorescences at stem tips and arising in the angles where petioles attach to their stems. The flowers' petals are white, with the stamens' relatively large, yellow, pollen-producing anthers conspicuously occupying the corollas' centers. The berry-type fruits are red and fleshy like small tomatoes.

== Distribution ==
Solanum donianum is native to Mexico, Guatemala, southern Florida and the Bahamas.

== Habitat ==
On Mexico's Yucatan Peninsula, Solanum donianum is described as inhabiting coastal dunes, occasionally flooded low-growing forest, medium-height partly deciduous forest, and disturbed areas. Pictures on this page are of an individual in white sand on a beach along the Yucatan Peninsula's Caribbean coast.

== Human uses ==
In warmer areas, mullein nightshade is grown in butterfly gardens, used in natural landscaping, and for restoring habitats. It's regarded as fast growing, and spreading from rhizomes to form small patches broader than tall.

Along Mexico's Yucatan coast among the Maya people, Solanum donianum has been reported as used for treating diabetes; the fruit is blended, strained and drunk on an empty stomach.

Laboratory analysis of 12 plant species known among the Yucatan's Maya people having medicinal value determined that Solanum donianum was potentially useful as:

- an ACE inhibitor (for high blood pressure and hearth failure
- an antimicrobial for human use
- an antifungal for use with plants

== Conservation status ==
In the US state of Florida, where Solanum donianum occurs in the extreme southern part of the pensula, it is listed as a native plant threatened by habitat loss and low population levels.

== Taxonomy ==
Genetic analysis has confirmed earlier concepts that Solanum donianum is a member of the Leptostemon clade, the "prickly clade", which is the largest major clade in the genus, along with about 570 other prickly species. Within that clade, it belongs to the smaller "Torva" clade, often considered Section Torva Nees.

The oldest binomial for Solanum donianum is the 1753 name Solanum verbascifoium by Linnaeus. However, that name has been so widely misapplied to S. erianthum that now it is rejected.

== Etymology ==
The derivation of the genus name Solanum is uncertain, though it's interesting to reflect that the New Latin solis means "of the sun", possibly alluding to the sunny habitats in which various species grows. Or maybe Solanum is based on the Latin solor, among the meanings of which are "to soothe", with the -anum from the Latin anus, meaning "anus", so it could refer to the soothing narcotic effect (maybe on a sore anus) produced by certain Solanum species.

The species name, donianum most likely is meant to honor the Scottish botanist George Don. On page 54 of the volume in which the formal description of Solanum donianum was published in 1842 by Wilhelm Gerhard Walpers, a specimen collected by "G. Don" was listed as S. Bahamense Mill., which Walpers treated as a synonym of S. donianum. George Don is known to have collected plants in Cuba and Cayman Islands in 1822, and well could have collected a plant named S. Bahamense.
