= Non-rebreather mask =

Device used for emergency oxygen therapy

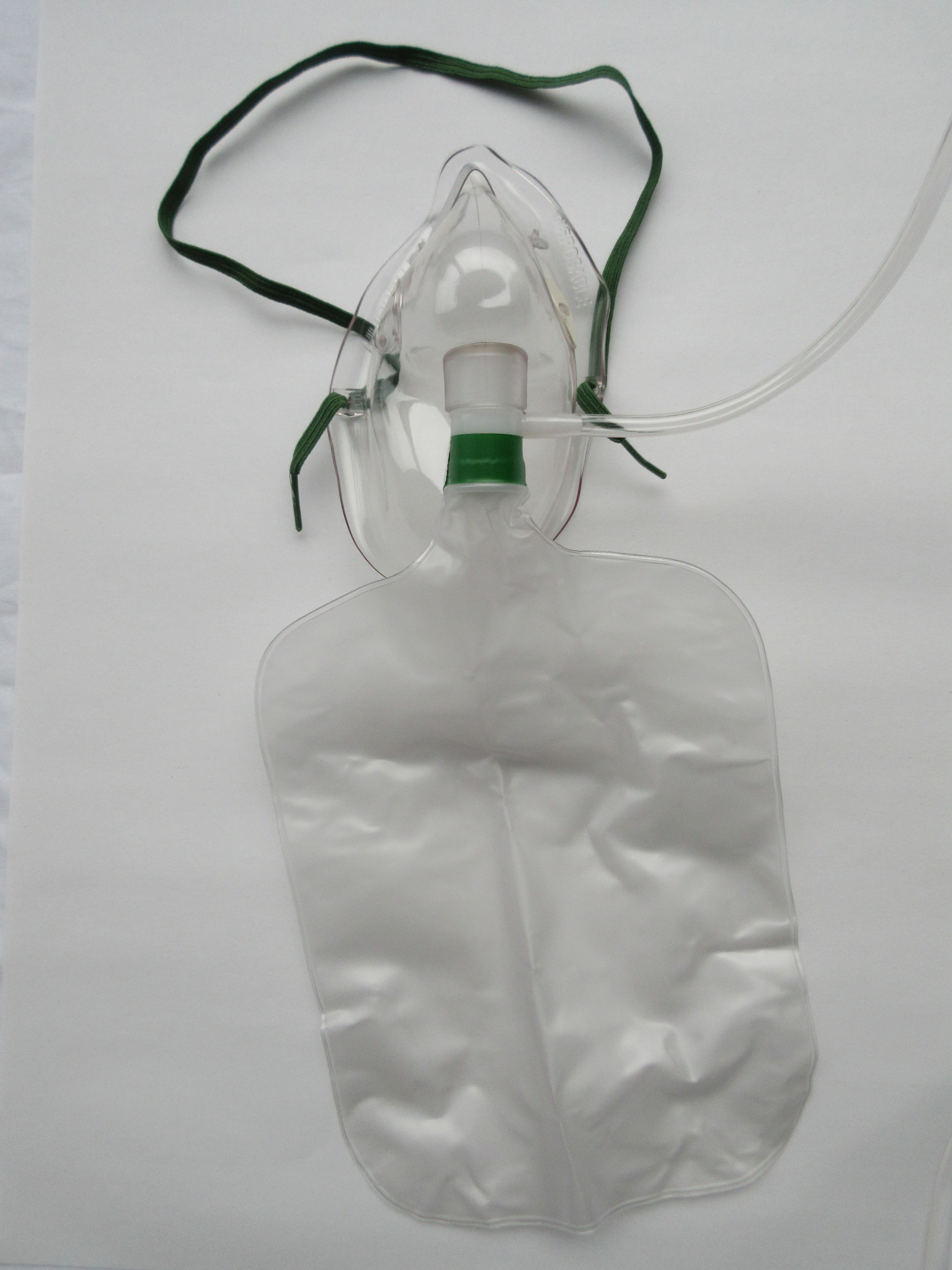
- Non-rebreather mask
- Acronym: NRB
- Synonyms: non-rebreather, non-rebreather facemask
- Specialty: emergency medicine, anaesthesiology, pulmonology
- Intervention: Oxygen therapy
- Related items: Nasal cannula
- [edit on Wikidata]

A non-rebreather mask (NRB, non-rebreather, non-rebreather facemask, etc.) is a device used in medicine to assist in the delivery of oxygen therapy. A NRB requires that the patient can breathe unassisted, but unlike a low-flow nasal cannula, the NRB allows for the delivery of higher concentrations of oxygen. An ideal non-rebreather mask does not permit air from the surrounding environment to be inhaled, hence an event of a source gas failure (e.g., the oxygen tank being drained completely) is life-threatening.

== Design ==
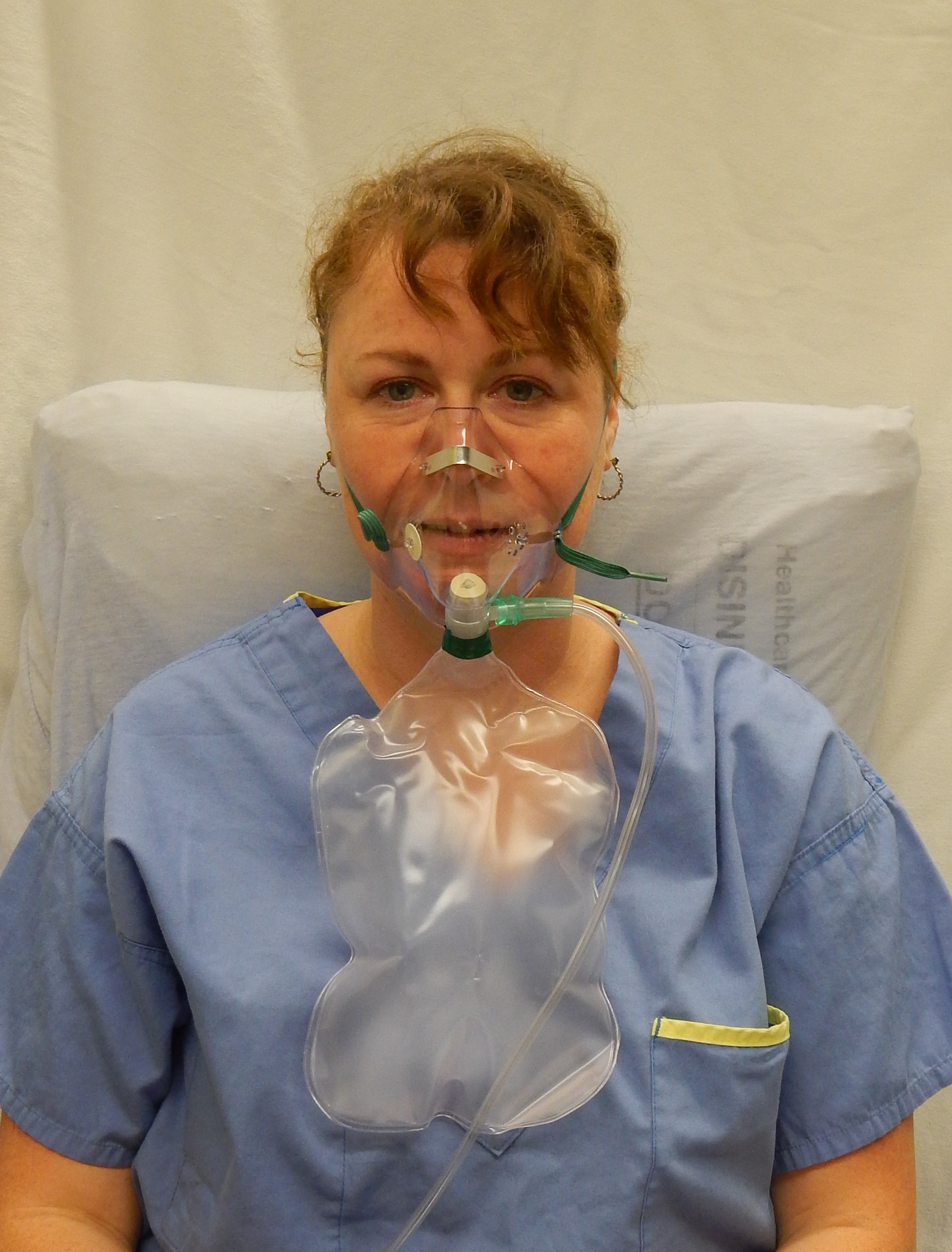
Non-rebreather mask covering a woman's nose and mouth

The non-rebreather mask covers both the nose and mouth of the patient and attaches with the use of an elastic cord around the patient's head. The NRB has an attached reservoir bag, typically one liter, that connects to an external oxygen tank or bulk oxygen supply system. Before an NRB is placed on the patient, the reservoir bag is inflated to greater than two-thirds full of oxygen, at a rate of 15 liters per minute (lpm). Approximately ¹/₃ of the oxygen from the reservoir is depleted as the patient inhales, and it is then replaced by the flow from the O_{2} supply. If the bag becomes completely deflated, the patient will no longer have a supplemental source of oxygen to breathe.

Exhaled gas is directed through a one-way valve in the mask, which prevents the inhalation of room air and the re-inhalation of exhaled air. The valve, along with a sufficient seal around the patient's nose and mouth, allows for the administration of high concentrations of oxygen, approximately 60% - 90% O_{2}. Many textbooks report higher oxygen concentrations, however formal studies reporting these levels are not referenced to research. The patient must partially deflate the reservoir bag during inspiration or the high oxygen concentration will not be achieved, and the mask will provide only the flow rate setting on the flowmeter.

Ideally, a non-rebreather mask would not permit air from the surrounding environment to be inhaled. However, due to safety concerns regarding anti-suffocation protection in the event of a source gas failure (i.e. the oxygen cylinder being drained completely), one of the two one-way valves is normally removed, allowing inhalation of outside air to a significant degree. However, as almost all non-rebreathing masks are disposable, and manufactured in one adult size, most (from decades of clinical observation) do not provide a good seal with an individual patient's face, thus permitting the inflow of large amounts of ambient air (most air follows the path of least resistance), and diluting the oxygen provided. Hence, very few patients receive anything close to 100% oxygen. Very high flows (> = 30 LPM) from the oxygen flowmeter are required to partially overcome room air dilution. Further, the larger the patient's inspiratory flow rate, the greater the dilution from air. Very little effort is required by most patients, to inspire at flow rates in excess of 50 LPM (easily seen in the pulmonary function lab with routine spirometric testing).

Partial rebreather masks are designed to capture the first 150ml of the exhaled breath into the reservoir bag for inhalation during the subsequent breath. This portion of the breath was initially delivered at the end of inhalation and was therefore delivered to the "deadspace" anatomy where gas exchange did not occur. Therefore, there would be no depletion of oxygen nor gain of carbon dioxide during the rebreathing component.

== Usage ==
The non-rebreather mask is utilized for patients with physical trauma, chronic airway limitation, cluster headache, smoke inhalation, and carbon monoxide poisoning, or any other patients who require high-concentration oxygen, but do not require breathing assistance. Patients uncomfortable with having a mask on their face, such as those with claustrophobia, or patients with injuries to the mouth are more likely to benefit from a nasal cannula, or passive ("blow-by") oxygen. Patients who are unable to breathe on their own would require invasive or noninvasive mechanical ventilation.

== See also ==
- Oxygen therapy – Use of oxygen as a medical treatment
- Nasal cannula – Medical device to deliver supplemental oxygen
- Bag valve mask – Hand-held device to provide positive pressure ventilation
