= Respiratory gas humidification =

Method of conditioning respiratory gas

Respiratory gas humidification is a method of artificially conditioning respiratory gas for the patient during therapy, and involves humidification, warming, and occasionally filtration of the gas being delivered. If these three measures are not performed to compensate for the natural conditioning of air by the respiratory system, lung infections and lung tissue damage may occur. This is particularly problematic in high gas-flow therapies such as mechanical ventilation, in patient populations with highly sensitive respiratory tracts (i.e. asthmatics), or among those requiring ventilation for longer periods of time. The two methods currently available for this purpose are active or passive respiratory gas humidification.

== Active respiratory gas humidifiers ==
An active respiratory gas humidifier ensures that patients on mechanical ventilation are supplied with optimally conditioned respiratory gas. In active humidifying processes, moisture and heat is input to respiratory gas by an electrically powered humidifier. Performance data and safety-related requirements for active respiratory gas humidifiers are specified by the standard ISO 8185. According to that standard, the minimum water content of inspired respiratory gas is ca. 33 mg/dm³ and the maximum respiratory gas temperature is ca. 42 °C.

The aggregation of water in the gas produced by an active respiratory gas humidifier may be a suspension, or aerosol, which is produced by a nebulizer; or particulate water, output from an evaporator or bubble humidifier.

=== Nebulizers ===
Nebulizers generate aerosols consisting of droplets of various sizes that are admixed to the inspired respiratory gas. Types of nebulizers currently on the market include

1. Small volume nebulizers, which are used to administer medications such as salbuterol or albuterol.
2. Large volume nebulizers, which are similar to bubble humidifiers except for the addition of an air entrainment port, and
3. Ultrasonic nebulizers, which may carry a risk of overwatering the patient.

The high density mist produced by nebulizers is useful in decreasing the viscosity of respiratory secretions in those suffering from conditions such as cystic fibrosis, croup, epiglottitis, and bronchiectasis.

=== Evaporators ===
Evaporators enrich the inspired respiratory gas with water vapor. In a throughflow evaporator, the inspiration flow is led through a warmed up water bath, in case of a surface evaporator however the inspiration flow is guided along the surface of the water level. Consequently, a surface evaporator transports only water vapor and no water droplets into the patient. Therefore, the risk of passing on germs by surface evaporators is minimal.

=== Bubble humidifiers ===
In a bubble humidifier, or bubble bottle as they are affectionately known by respiratory therapists, the inspiration flow is guided through a capillary system. In this capillary system warmed up water is circulating. Although the humidifying capacity of a bubble respiratory gas humidifier is rather low, it may be improved by increasing the water temperature. A bubble bottle is mostly used in oxygen therapy with high flow rates via a mask, nasopharyngeal catheter, or nasal cannula in order to prevent drying of the mucous membranes in the nose and mouth.

== Passive respiratory gas humidifiers ==
Passive respiratory gas humidifiers are independent from any external energy source or external water supply. They function as heat and moisture exchangers (HMEs) and are placed like an artificial nose between a tube and Y piece. Here they withdraw heat and moisture from expirations, which they resupply to the inspired gas during the following inspiration. As there are significant functional differences among the various HMEs on the market, respiratory therapists should test the efficacy of each individual model. The ideal HME has high reversible water retention capacity, small internal volume, and low flow resistance.

To enable the absorption of sufficient amounts of water and heat, the expiratory stream of respiratory gas must be fully filtered through the HME. Leakages in the system, such as may be caused by bronchial fistulae, will render this system less effective. Other negative effects of this technology include increased secretions (i.e. mucus) and nosebleeds, either or which may clog an HME. In such cases, the application of active respiratory gas humidifiers is recommended.
