= EAB =

EAB may refer to:

- Abbs Airport, in Yemen
- American School of Brasília (Portuguese: Escola Americana de Brasília)
- Eagle Atlantic Airlines, a defunct Ghanaian airline
- East African Breweries, a Kenyan holding company
- Emerald ash borer, a beetle
- Emergency Air Breather, used onboard U.S. submarines
- European Association for Biometrics, non-profit organization
- Esperanto Association of Britain, an educational charity
- European American Bank, now part of Citigroup
- Expert Action Badge, in the United States Army
- External Assessments Bureau, now the National Assessments Bureau, a New Zealand intelligence agency
- Hellenic Aerospace Industry, a Greek aerospace company
- EAB (company) formerly Education Advisory Board, a former division of The Advisory Board Company, an American consulting firm
- Ethyl acetoxy butanoate, a GHB derivative.
