= Breathing apparatus =

Equipment allowing or assisting the user to breathe in a hostile environment

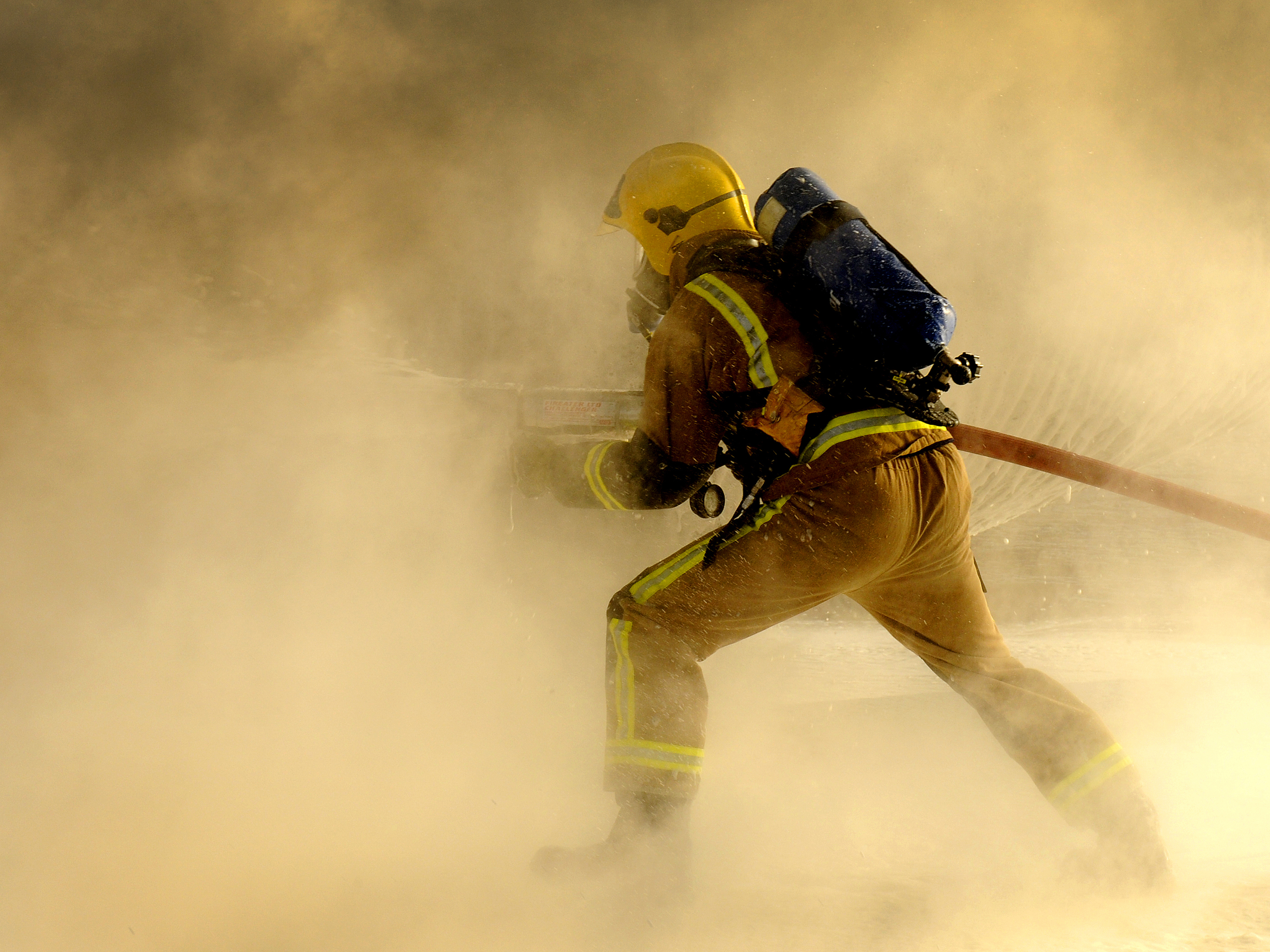
In an atmosphere that may be oxygen-deficient, or toxic, an air supply can be carried on the back.

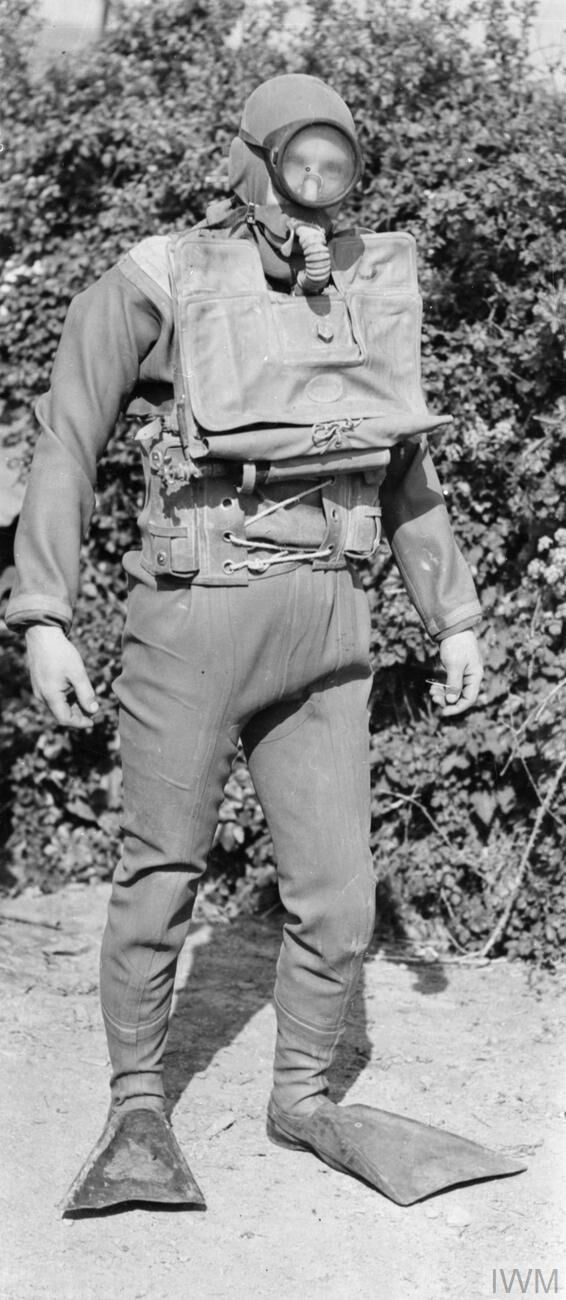
Royal Navy commando in 1945

A breathing apparatus or breathing set is equipment which allows a person to breathe in a hostile environment where breathing would otherwise be impossible, difficult, harmful, or hazardous, or assists a person to breathe. A respirator, medical ventilator, or resuscitator may also be considered to be breathing apparatus. Equipment that supplies or recycles breathing gas other than ambient air in a space used by several people is usually referred to as being part of a life-support system, and a life-support system for one person may include breathing apparatus, when the breathing gas is specifically supplied to the user rather than to the enclosure in which the user is the occupant.

Breathing apparatus may be classified by type in several ways:

- By breathing gas source: self-contained gas supply, remotely supplied gas, or purified ambient air
- By environment: underwater/hyperbaric, terrestrial/normobaric, or high altitude/hypobaric
- By breathing circuit type: open, semi-closed, or closed circuit
- By gas supply type: constant flow, supply on demand, or supplemental
- By ventilatory driving force: the breathing effort of the user, or mechanical work from an external source
- By operational pressure regime: at ambient pressure or in isolation from ambient pressure
- By gas mixture: air, oxygen enriched air, pure oxygen or mixed gases
- By purpose: underwater diving, mountaineering, aeronautical, industrial, emergency and escape, and medical

The user respiratory interface is the delivery system by which the breathing apparatus guides the breathing gas flow to and from the user. Some form of facepiece, hood or helmet is usual, but for some medical interventions an invasive method may be necessary.

Any given unit is a member of several types. The well-known recreational scuba set is a self-contained, open circuit, demand supplied, high pressure stored air, ambient pressure, underwater diving type, delivered through a bite-grip secured mouthpiece.

== Definition and scope ==
Semantically, the term breathing apparatus implies any set of equipment and materials specifically intended to enable or facilitate breathing, which could include equipment as basic as a snorkel or artificial airway, or as complex as an anaesthetic machine or a space suit. Actual usage varies, and breathing apparatus, breathing set, ventilator and respirator have similar and overlapping meanings which vary depending on the sources chosen. Breathing set appears to be a secondary synonym for breathing apparatus, as internet searches appear to all be redirected to breathing apparatus. According to Merriam-Webster, a ventilator can be a medical device to provide artificially assisted respiration, or equipment to circulate fresh air through a space, while a respirator is usually a mask worn to protect the user from particulate contaminants in the air, but can also mean a device for providing artificial respiration. The usage in the sense of a filtering mask dates to the early 19th century and the artificial respiration sense dates to the second half of the 19th century, so both are well established.

The UK Health and Safety Executive (HSE) distinguishes between respirators and breathing apparatus. Respirators are described as filtering devices, which may be powered, using a motor to pass ambient air through the filter, or unpowered, relying on the wearer's breathing to draw ambient air through the filter. The distinguishing features of a respirator in this context appear to be that the air is not significantly compressed at any stage, is filtered, and is at approximately ambient pressure. The HSE definition for breathing apparatus is that they use a supply of breathing quality gas from an independent source, such as air compressors or compressed gas cylinders. In this case compression of the supply gas at some stage is implied. Both respirators and breathing apparatus are classed as respiratory protective equipment by the HSE.

Vocabulary.com describes a breathing apparatus as "a device that facilitates breathing in cases of respiratory failure", which is a functional description of a medical ventilator, or a resuscitator.

McGraw-Hill Dictionary of Scientific & Technical Terms defines breathing apparatus as "An appliance that enables a person to function in irrespirable or poisonous gases or fluids; contains a supply of oxygen and a regenerator which removes the carbon dioxide exhaled", which is the description of any type or application of rebreather.

=== Breathing gas source ===
The US Occupational Safety and Health Administration (OSHA) uses the source of the breathing gas to distinguish between types of breathing apparatus, and considers respirators to be a type or class of breathing apparatus:

An atmosphere-supplying respirator is a breathing apparatus that supplies the user with breathing gas from a source independent of the ambient atmosphere, such as supplied-air respirators (SARs) and self-contained breathing apparatus (SCBA).

A self-contained breathing apparatus (SCBA) is a type of atmosphere-supplying breathing apparatus in which the breathing gas source is carried by the user.

A supplied-air respirator (SAR), or airline respirator, is a type of atmosphere-supplying breathing apparatus which uses a hose to supply breathing gas from a source which is not carried by the user.

An air-purifying respirator is a breathing apparatus which uses a filter, cartridge, or canister, to remove specific air contaminants by passing ambient air through the air-purifying component. No distinction is made based on the mechanism of passing the air through the purifying component – it may be the lungs of the user or a mechanical device.

The breathing gas source may be the ambient atmosphere, compressed air supplied from a low pressure compressor in real time, oxygen enriched air supplied from an oxygen concentrator, high-pressure stored compressed air, supercritical compressed air, oxygen or blended gas mixtures, liquid oxygen, chemically generated oxygen, or a combination of ambient atmosphere and another of these sources.

=== Breathing gas regulator ===
When using a pressurised gas supply, the breathing gas must be supplied to the respiratory interface at a suitable pressure for inhalation, which is close to ambient pressure. This is generally done by a breathing gas regulator, a pressure reduction regulator, which reduces the gas supply pressure from the supply line. Exhalation is usually to the surroundings at ambient pressure, but in special cases such as built-in breathing systems and gas reclaim systems, it may be exhausted to a significantly lower pressure, sometimes at a remote location, and may require a back-pressure regulator to do this safely.

== Breathing circuit type ==
Supplied gas breathing apparatus can be categorised by how the gas is supplied to the user. There are several combinations of options

=== Constant flow ===
The gas can be supplied continuously, in what is known as a constant flow, continuous flow, or free-flow system. The user inhales from the stream of fresh gas passing the face, and exhales back into the same stream. Supply rate must be sufficient that at reasonably foreseeable work rates, the inhaled gas does not include too much of the previously exhaled gas. This is simple, but wasteful of supplied gas.

=== Demand ===
The gas is supplied on demand when the user inhales, using the pressure drop at the start of inhalation to control the opening of a demand valve and automatic stops when there is no demand. This is more conservative in gas usage but has a higher work of breathing. It requires a facepiece that seals moderately well to the user with a small internal volume to limit dead space. Some demand supplied breathing apparatus can be switched to continuous flow mode.

=== Open circuit ===
Open circuit breathing apparatus is any breathing apparatus that does not recycle any of the breathing gas, and discharges it all to the surroundings.

Supply can be further classified as positive and negative pressure systems, based on the pressure maintained when flow has stopped, and whether the breathing gas pressure in the apparatus ever drops below ambient pressure. Open circuit systems without mixing during delivery are simple and the gas supplied is consistent and reliable.

=== Enriched gas ===
Both constant flow and demand supply can also provide gas from two sources, one of them being the ambient atmosphere, in what is generally referred to as supplemental oxygen provision, frequently used for medical purposes where the user is at risk for medical hypoxia, and at high altitudes where the oxygen partial pressure is naturally low.

=== Closed and semi-closed circuit ===
Closed and semi-closed circuit breathing sets, also known as rebreathers and gas extenders, are breathing apparatus that absorb the carbon dioxide from, and add oxygen to, a user's exhaled breath, allowing unused oxygen and diluent (if present) to be recycled. A rebreather system may be used for any application of a supplied gas breathing set. It may be more complex than open circuit if the mixture must be controlled, and for short endurance applications may be heavier. There may be a greater fire hazard due to high oxygen concentration. In other applications, when long endurance and reasonably light weight is required, it may allow a large saving of gas and be much simpler or lighter than the equivalent open circuit option. Rebreather systems can be closed or semi-closed circuit, have a pendulum or loop flow path configuration, and the gas can be circulated by the breathing of the user through non-return valves, (almost all self-contained units), by the energy of the injected fresh gas, (Dräger Modell 1915 "Bubikopf", DM20 and DM40, and US Navy Mk V helium helmet gas extenders,), or by an external power input (the oxygen in a space suit is circulated by an electric fan). When powered by breathing effort, rebreather units will have an elevated work of breathing, particularly with high gas densities at great depth, which is a limiting factor for diving rebreathers, even when the diluent is helium.

=== Self-contained or remotely supplied ===
Breathing apparatus can also be categorised as self-contained, where everything is carried by the user, or remotely supplied, with a hose to supply gas from the supply panel and in some cases a return hose for the exhaled gas.

Remotely supplied applications include:

- Surface-supplied diving equipment (SSDE) is diving equipment supplied with breathing gas using a diver's umbilical or airline from the surface, such as from a boat or offshore platform.
- Supplied-air respirators (SAR). or airline respirators, use a hose to supply breathing gas from a source which is not carried by the user.
- Built-in breathing systems in submarines or hyperbaric chambers.
- Some space suits and pressure suits,
- Some diving rebreathers. When remotely supplied they are likely to be semi-closed circuit, and called gas extenders, and their main function is likely to be to save expensive helium diluent gas. In helium reclaim systems, exhaled gas is returned to the surface to be recycled.
- Flight crew breathing apparatus
- Aircraft emergency oxygen systems for passengers in commercial airliners.

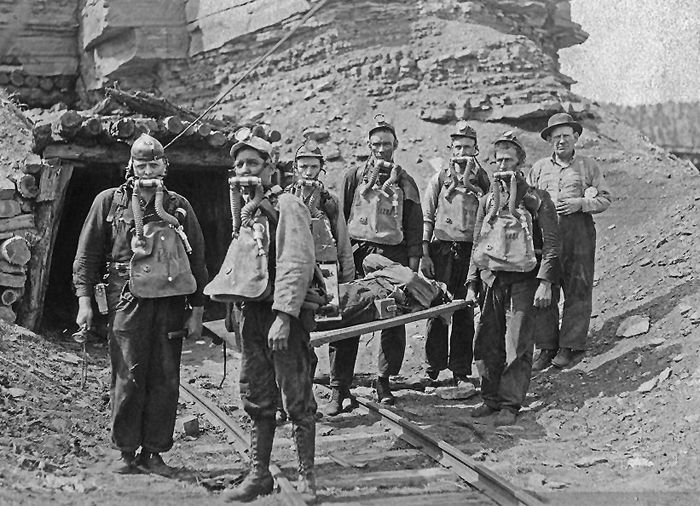
Recovery of casualties after the explosion at the Primero coal mine in Colorado, 1910

Self-contained applications include:

- Self-contained breathing apparatus (SCBA), used out of water, worn by rescue workers, firefighters and others in contaminated, toxic or hypoxic atmospheres
- Self-contained underwater breathing apparatus (scuba), used underwater for recreational and occupational diving
- Escape sets, including underwater diving bailout sets
- Most rebreather sets,
- Mountaineering breathing apparatus, which provides supplementary oxygen from a supply carried by the user,
- Air-purifying respirators, which filter contaminants from ambient air.

== User respiratory interface ==
The user respiratory interface, also commonly referred to as the facepiece, is the delivery system by which the breathing apparatus controls breathing gas flow to and from the user. The choice of interface type and the fit can significantly influence convenience, effectiveness, comfort, and sometimes safety. Several types are in use:

=== Nasal cannula ===
A nasal cannula is relatively unobtrusive and is widely used for supplemental oxygen. The basic version is used to deliver continuous flow supplemental oxygen at rates from 1 to 6 litres per minute. It has two short prongs that fit into the nostrils for delivery, that are connected to a common tube, which is usually hooked over the ears for support. The more complex reservoir cannula is an oxygen conserving supplemental oxygen administration device which accumulates constant flow oxygen in a small reservoir below the nose during exhalation and delivers it in a bolus at the beginning of the next inhalation, which ensures that most of it reaches the parts of the lung in which gas exchange occurs, and little is wasted in dead space.

=== Nasal mask ===
A nasal mask covers the nose and seals against the upper lip, the sides of the nose, and the bridge of the nose.

=== Nasal pillow mask ===
A nasal pillow mask seals on the rim of the nostrils. It is used in stable patients with sleep-disordered breathing.

=== Artificial airway ===
An artificial airway uses a medical device to provide a patent airway. This requires intervention by a competent person, and may be supraglottic, infraglottic, or surgically placed. These applications are mostly used in emergency medicine and surgery. Devices in this class include laryngeal mask airways, esophageal-tracheal combitubes, endotracheal tubes, and tracheostomy tubes.

=== Mouthpiece ===
A mouthpiece, usually held in place by a bite-grip, and sealed by the lips, is common in scuba equipment, snorkels, and some types of escape breathing apparatus. A mouthpiece is simple and effective, with minimal dead space, and reliably seals without need for adjustment, but must be actively held in place by the user, and can cause jaw fatigue over long periods. A mouthpiece retaining strap may be used to reduce jaw fatigue and the risk of losing grip on the mouthpiece in an emergency. A mouthpiece only allows mouth breathing of the delivered gas, and it may be necessary to block the nose to prevent bypass. A mouthpiece makes intelligible speech difficult or impossible, and eating or drinking require temporary removal.

=== Oral mask ===
An oral mask fits inside the mouth between the teeth and lips, with a guide to prevent the tongue from obstructing the airway. They are not often used.

=== Breathing mask ===
A breathing mask, also called a facepiece, is a component which covers the mouth and nose, sometimes also the eyes and other parts of the face, and may seal against the face. A breathing mask is usually effective, allows mouth and nose breathing, and can usually be sealed adequately without effort by the user. A wide range of designs are available depending on the application. The disadvantages are that the user cannot eat or drink while the mask is in place, and some models may interfere with speech, while others may have relatively large dead space. Three basic configurations are distinguished by the area they cover.

The orinasal mask, also called oro-nasal, oral-nasal, or quarter mask, covers the mouth and nostrils and seals to the front of the face on the bridge and sides of the nose and mouth and the chin with little dead space.

The half-mask extends below the chin, and the full-face mask covers the eyes as well as the nose and mouth, and can have a dead space so large that an inner orinasal mask is provided to reduce the dead space. A diving half-mask used in scuba and freediving covers the eyes and nose, and is not breathing apparatus.

A full-face mask is generally only used when including the eyes in the protected space is necessary, and often includes an inner orinasal mask to reduce dead space.

=== Breathing hood ===
A breathing hood is a type of respiratory interface that completely covers the head and neck, and optionally the shoulders or upper torso, with a loose-fitting bag, which may have a neck seal or be relatively close fitting at the neck or shoulders. They are used in escape breathing apparatus of several kinds (escape hoods), and as a route for supplementary oxygen (oxygen hoods). Breathing hoods with full length visors are commonly used with free-flow supplied air respirators for industrial work like in spray painting, boatbuilding, and woodworking workshops.

=== Breathing helmet ===
A breathing helmet is usually defined as a rigid respiratory user interface covering the head that also provides head protection against impact and penetration. In medical terminology, a breathing helmet is synonymous with a breathing hood, and need not have any rigid protective structure.

== Ambient pressure regimes ==
Breathing apparatus may be used in various pressure regimes: hyperbaric for diving, tunneling, and caisson work, normobaric where the ambient atmosphere is unbreathable, or supplemental oxygen is needed for medical reasons, and hypobaric at high altitudes and in space.

=== Hypobaric systems ===
High altitude breathing apparatus is used for unpressurised (ambient pressure) aeronautical and mountaineering activities where the oxygen content of the natural atmosphere is insufficient for maintaining physical activity, consciousness, or life, but the atmospheric pressure is sufficient that a pressure suit is not needed.

Both rebreather and open circuit equipment have been used in this application, where either pure oxygen or supplemental oxygen is provided by the equipment. Minor leakage in either direction usually only affects efficiency and gas endurance, as the ambient air is usually only hypoxic due to low ambient pressure.

=== Normobaric systems ===
Breathing apparatus are used for mine escape and rescue, firefighting, or working in hypoxic or toxic atmospheres at pressures near to normal atmospheric pressure. These may supply breathing gas at a slight overpressure, also known as positive pressure, to prevent contamination by ambient gas, as leakage from the breathing set is generally less harmful than breathing the ambient gas.

This subclass includes both self-contained and airline supplied units, and self-contained units may use rebreather technology to extend gas endurance.

=== Hyperbaric systems ===
A breathing set intended for use in hyperbaric environments must not supply gas with a toxic concentration of oxygen. Most breathing sets for hyperbaric use are ambient pressure underwater breathing apparatus, but breathing apparatus may be necessary in a pressurised tunnel or caisson due to contamination by hazardous materials. Minor leakage to the environment is usually of little importance.

Open and closed circuit, self-contained, and remotely supplied systems are all in common use, but gas composition choice is complicated by the possibility of oxygen toxicity and decompression requirements. The possibilities of nitrogen narcosis and excessive gas density causing unacceptably high work of breathing make the use of helium as a diluent necessary for use at greater depths. The large range of pressures possible complicate decompression necessary to avoid decompression sickness, and the use of special gas mixtures to accelerate decompression is fairly common. This either requires the diver to use several mixtures at different depths which could be toxic if used at the wrong depth, or for closed circuit apparatus which provides reliable control and monitoring of the gas mixture. As a malfunction which cuts off breathing gas supply to a diver at depth could be rapidly fatal, bailout breathing apparatus may be carried in addition to the primary gas supply.

== Isolation from ambient pressure ==
At extremes of ambient pressure, the user must be isolated from the environment to survive, as in single atmosphere diving suits, where the occupant is kept at surface atmospheric pressure, isolated from the high ambient pressure of the deep underwater environment, and pressure suits and space suits where the interior of the suit is pressurised above the external environmental pressure. In these applications it is usual to use oxygen rebreather systems, as they are relatively safe, simple and efficient compared to open circuit, and do not inherently affect suit internal pressure. Liquid air has also been used for space suits, which implies an internal suit pressure close to normal atmospheric pressure, and open circuit. Leakage to or from the outside environment generally indicates a system failure and an emergency.

== Positive and negative pressure systems ==
Positive and negative pressure systems can have slightly different meanings in the context of breathing apparatus depending on whether the context is medical or non-medical applications.

=== Occupational health and safety ===
In this context these terms refer to the protection of the breathing circuit against leakage of contaminants.

Positive pressure means that the area around the mouth or nose inside the facepiece remains slightly higher than the ambient pressure outside the breathing apparatus facepiece at all times while in use, so that ambient gas or liquid cannot leak into the breathing space. This also has the physiological effect of assisting inhalation and resisting exhalation, but should not affect the total work of breathing.

Negative pressure means that the pressure inside the facepiece is lower than the ambient pressure outside the facepiece at some point during inhalation, and a good seal on the facepiece is required to prevent leakage of the ambient gas or liquid into the breathing space. This pressure offset is usually constant over all or several breaths, depending on the cause, and has the opposite effect of assisting exhalation and resisting inhalation, also with no net effect on the total work of breathing.

=== Underwater diving ===
The ambient pressure underwater varies with the depth, and diver attitude in the water can affect the variation in pressure between the lungs and the delivered gas in the mouthpiece by up to about 250 mm water (25 mb), but usually less, which can be positive or negative depending on the relative position of the lungs to the demand valve, exhaust valve of a free-flow helmet, or counterlung of a rebreather. Also called positive static lung load and negative static lung load

=== Medical ventilation ===
In this context the terms refer to the mechanism of inducing inhalation in a person who is not spontaneously breathing.

Positive pressure ventilation occurs when the breathing gas is delivered at a pressure higher than ambient, and gas is blown into the respiratory passages, inflating the lungs. This system is used by most mechanical ventilators and resuscitators.

Negative pressure ventilation occurs when the torso of the patient is subjected to an external pressure below ambient pressure, and ambient pressure air is drawn unto the lungs by the pressure difference induced by expansion of the chest. The equipment is traditionally known as an iron lung.

== Applications ==
Breathing apparatus may be used to providing gas suitable for breathing in a range of applications where the ambient environment does not provide suitable breathing gas:

=== Underwater breathing apparatus ===
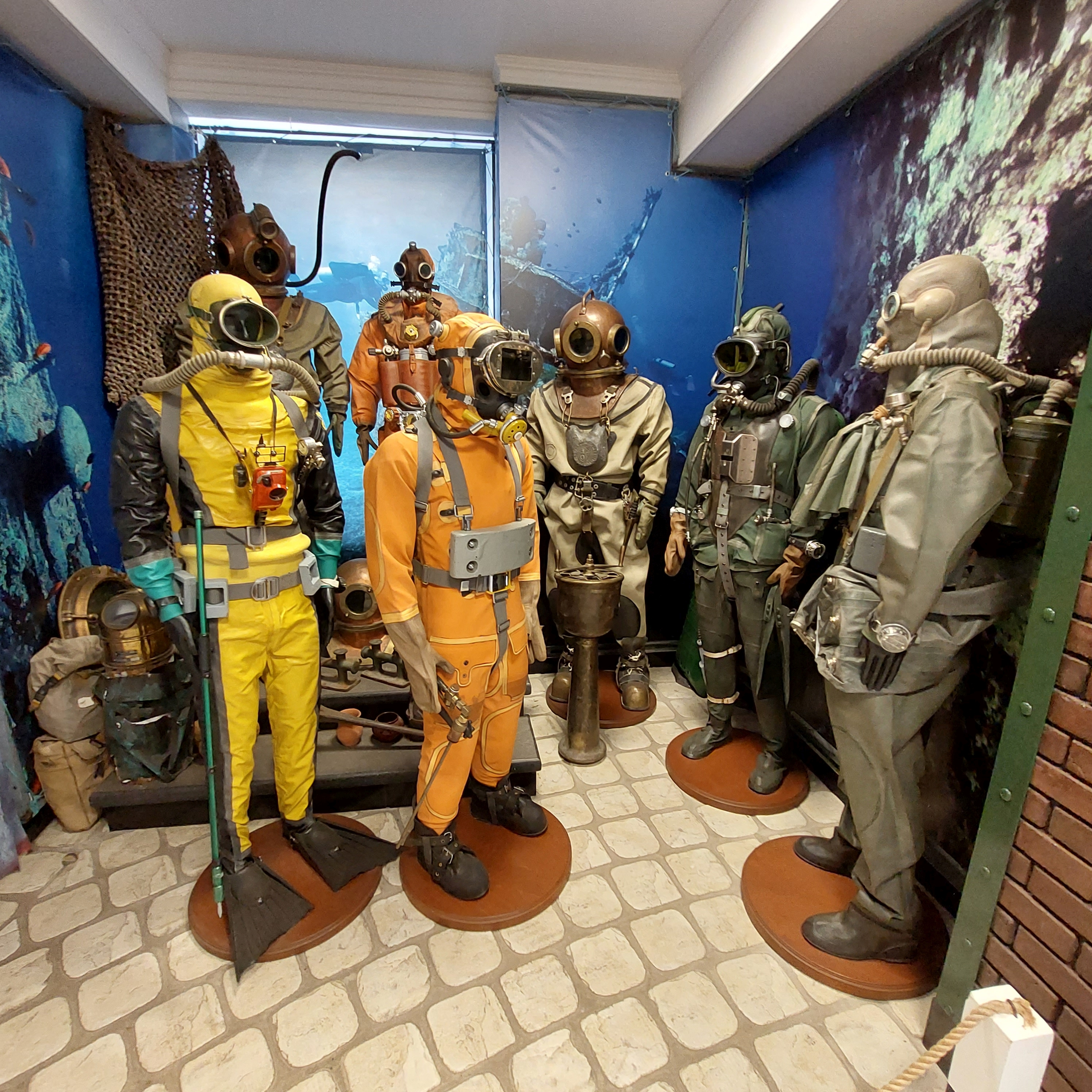
A museum display of diving dry suits with different breathing apparatus configurations

Underwater breathing apparatus is any breathing apparatus intended to allow the user to breathe underwater, and includes open circuit scuba, diving rebreathers and surface supplied diving equipment, and both ambient pressure and controlled pressure single atmosphere systems.

The major categories of ambient pressure underwater breathing apparatus are:

- Scuba set, any breathing set that is carried entirely by an underwater diver and provides the diver with breathing gas at the ambient pressure:
  - Open circuit scuba, where the diver carries the gas supply, and exhaled gas is exhausted to the environment
  - Diving rebreathers, where the diver carries the gas supply, and exhaled gas is partly or entirely recycled for further use, and
- Surface supplied diving equipment, where the gas supply is provided from the surface through a hose in a diver's umbilical This may be free-flow open circuit, demand open circuit, semi-closed circuit gas extenders, or closed circuit helium reclaim.

Two other types may also be identified:

- Escape sets provide a limited amount of breathing gas to allow the user to reach the surface from a disabled vessel or vehicle, such as a disabled submarine, a sunken armoured vehicle, or a ditched helicopter. These may also be open or closed circuit.
- Atmospheric pressure underwater breathing apparatus is also used, in the form of armoured atmospheric diving suits, which maintain an internal pressure approximating surface pressure. Their breathing apparatus tend to be closed circuit rebreathers.

=== Industrial breathing apparatus ===
Breathing gas must be supplied for work in unbreathable normobaric atmospheres, which may be toxic, irritant, narcotic or hypoxic, and may include firefighting, damage control, exploration, and rescue work, and in normobaric environments where contamination of the person (hazmat environments) must be avoided. Open circuit and rebreather systems can be used, and self-contained (SCBA) and remotely supplied systems are used depending on the requirement for mobility. Positive or negative pressure equipment may be appropriate, depending on what is to be protected from contamination.

A supplied-air respirator (SAR), also called an airline respirator, is a type of respiratory protection equipment used where the ambient atmosphere is unsuitable to breathe directly or after filtering at the user. The equipment may provide air on demand, at positive pressure, or may supply a constant flow at a rate greater than the user's peak demand rate.

Depending on the nature of the hazardous atmosphere, the user may need to wear personal protective equipment to isolate the entire body from the environment (hazmat suit).

=== Emergency and escape breathing sets ===
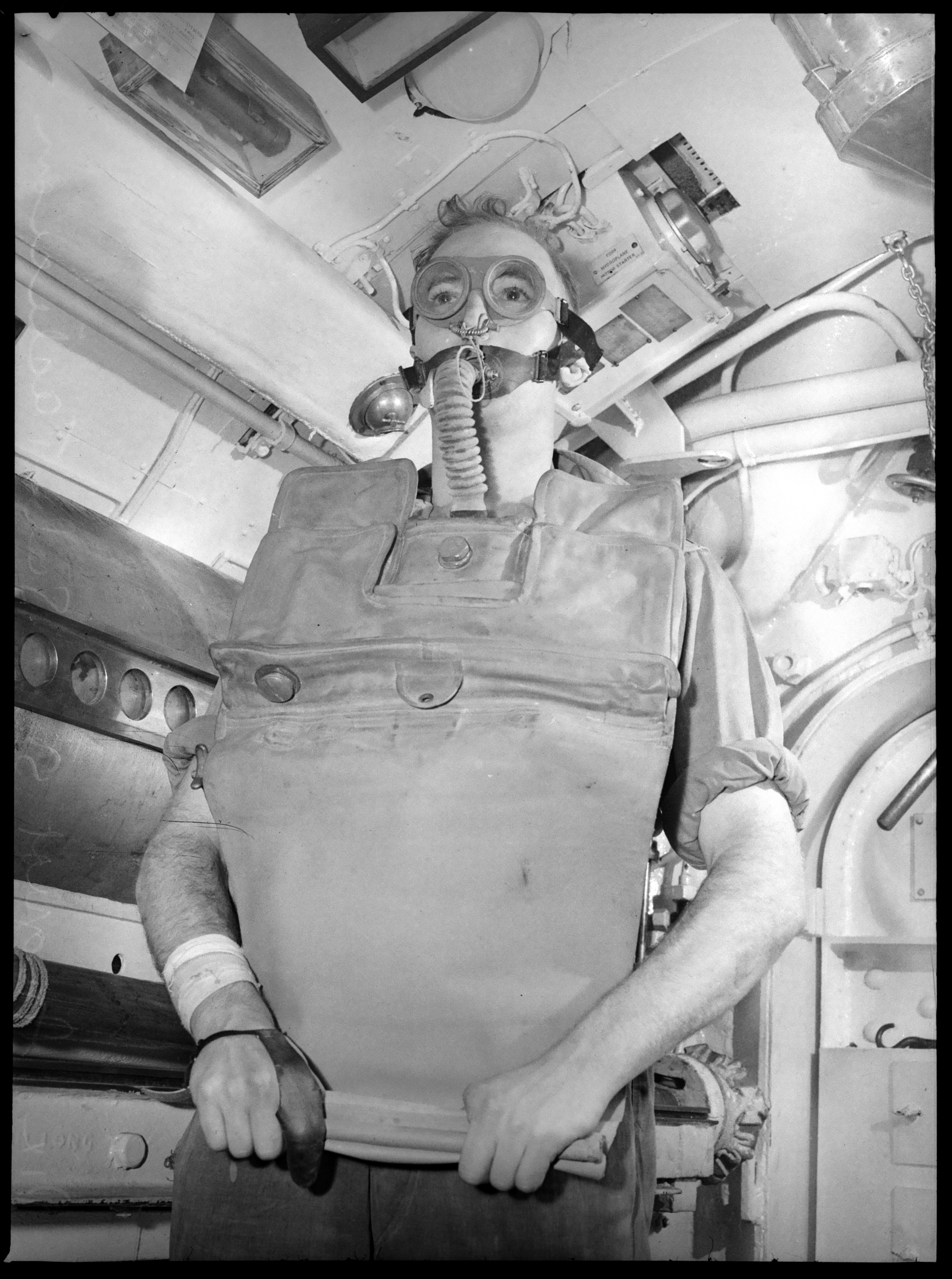
Sailor with Davis Submerged Escape Apparatus on submarine 'Tactician', 1950

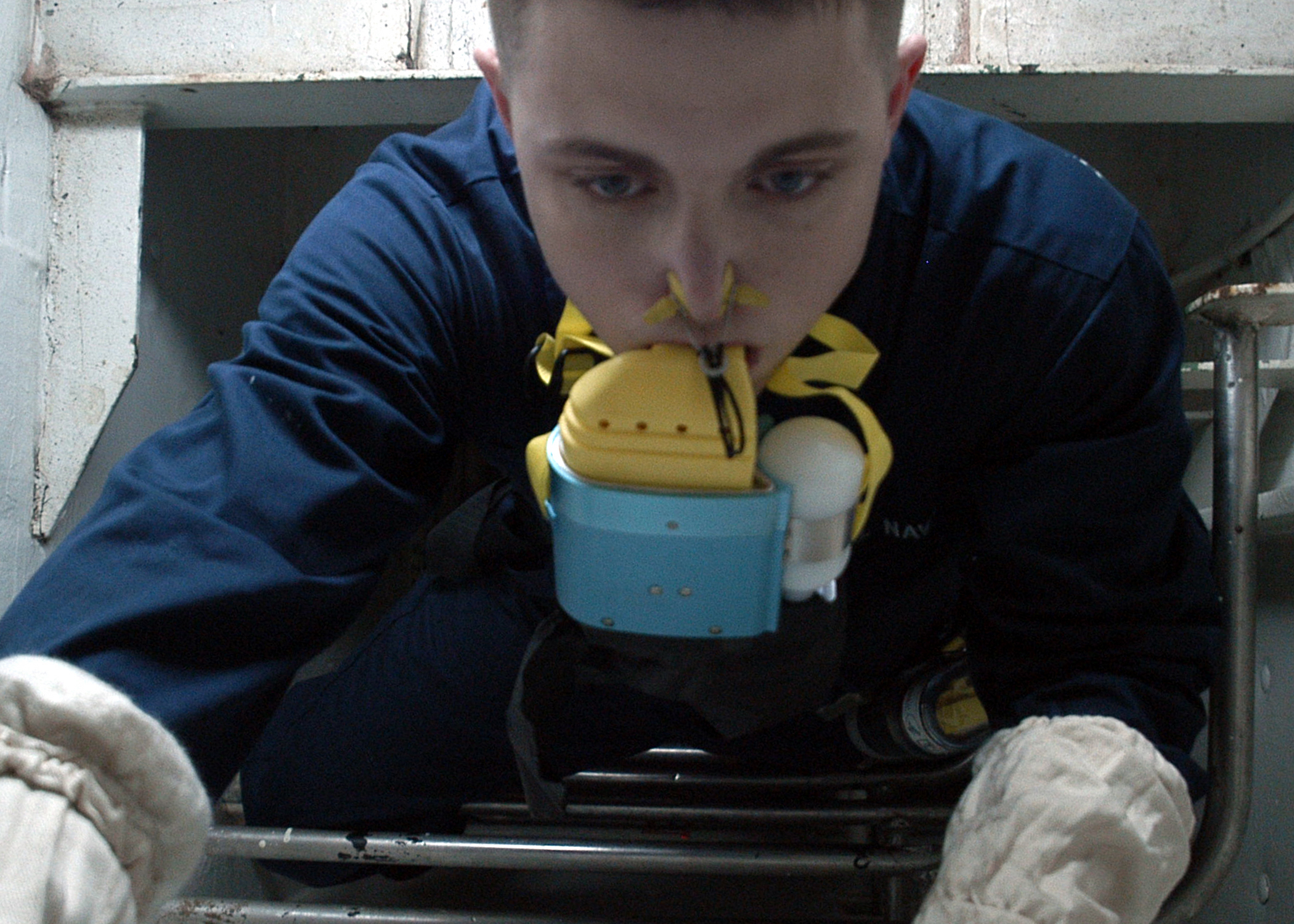
US Navy Emergency Escape Breathing Device (EEBD)

Escape breathing apparatus are a class of self contained atmosphere supplying or air purifying breathing apparatus for use in emergencies, intended to allow the user to pass through areas without a breathable atmosphere to a place of relative safety where the ambient air is safe to breathe. These are ambient pressure systems, and include:

- Helicopter escape set
- Mine escape set
- Submarine escape set
- Amphibious Tank Escape Apparatus
- Smoke hood

Early escape sets were often rebreathers and were typically used to escape from submarines that were unable to surface. Escape sets are also used ashore, in the mining industry, and by the military for escape from tanks.

The small open-circuit scuba Helicopter Aircrew Breathing Device has the similar purpose of providing breathing gas to escape from a ditched helicopter.

Another type of emergency breathing set, which is remotely supplied, is built-in breathing systems in submarines and hyperbaric chambers.

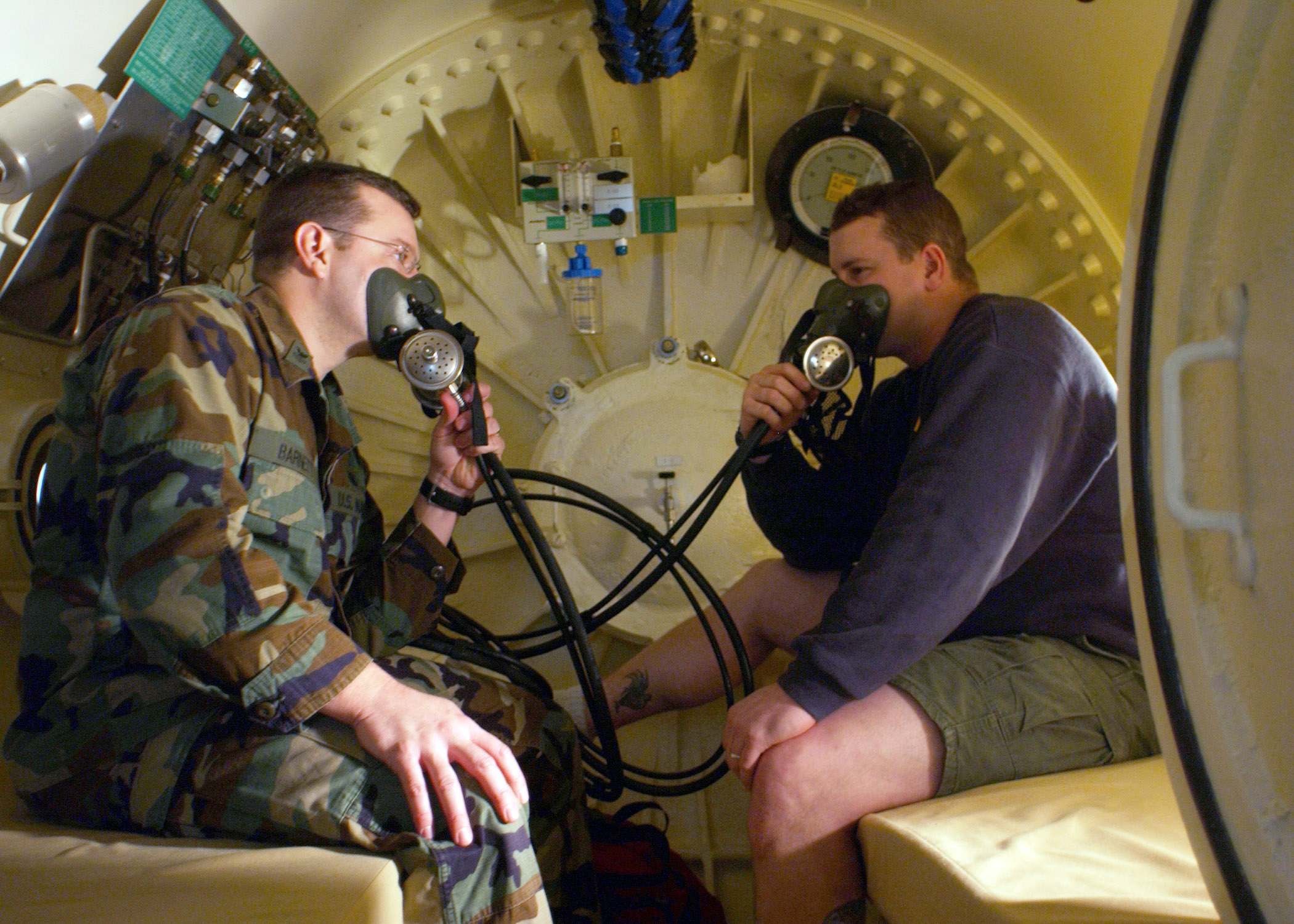
Navy divers testing the built-in breathing masks inside a recompression chamber

A built-in breathing system is a source of breathing gas installed in a confined space where an alternative to the ambient gas may be required for medical treatment, emergency use, or to minimise a hazard. They are found in diving chambers, hyperbaric treatment chambers, and submarines.

The use in hyperbaric treatment chambers is usually to supply an oxygen rich treatment gas which if used as the chamber atmosphere, would constitute an unacceptable fire hazard. In this application the exhaust gas is vented outside of the chamber. In saturation diving chambers and surface decompression chambers the application is similar, but a further function is a supply of breathable gas in case of toxic contamination of the chamber atmosphere. This function does not require external venting, but the same equipment is typically used for supply of oxygen enriched gases, so they are generally vented to the exterior by default.

In submarines the function is to supply a breathable gas in an emergency, which may be contamination of the ambient internal atmosphere, or flooding. In this application venting to the interior is both acceptable and generally the only feasible option, as the exterior is typically at a higher pressure than the interior, and external venting is not possible by passive means.

The emergency oxygen supplied to passengers in commercial airliners that have lost cabin pressure is also a basic form of built-in breathing system, where the oxygen is generated and supplied as a constant flow for a limited period, which should be sufficient to allow the aircraft to safely descend to an altitude where the ambient air oxygen content is sufficient to support consciousness. These systems vent to the interior.

Smoke hoods and other escape respirators are used in many industrial environments where they may be needed to evacuate a building in a fire or other incident which may compromise the ambient air quality but there is likely to be sufficient oxygen remaining to sustain the necessary activity.

Emergency and escape breathing apparatus may provide purified ambient air where it has sufficient oxygen and it is reasonably practicable to purify it, or may supply stored breathing gas that is known to be respirable.

=== Supplemental oxygen provision ===
Supplemental oxygen is oxygen additional to that available from atmospheric air at the ambient pressure. This may be necessary or desirable in hypobaric environments, or for medical purposes in any pressure regime. With supplemental oxygen the flow rate is often stipulated, but it is the partial pressure in the alveoli that is important to achieve the desired result, and that is strongly dependent on the delivery system of the breathing apparatus and the ambient pressure. Systems providing a constant flow rate of open circuit oxygen at the nose or mouth will waste a lot of the gas to dead space and during exhalation.

==== Oxygen conserving devices ====
A closed circuit rebreather is highly effective at conserving stored oxygen, but it makes no use of ambient oxygen, so its effectiveness at minimising use of stored oxygen depends on where it is used. It is most applicable where it is not possible to use enriched ambient gas, either because there is none (underwater and in space), because its pressure is too low (extreme altitude), because it does not contain a useful partial pressure of oxygen, or because the contaminants make the risk unacceptable.

The delivery of open circuit supplemental oxygen is most effective if it is made at a point in the breathing cycle when it will be inhaled to the alveoli, where gas transfer occurs. This is during the first part of inhalation. Oxygen delivered later in the cycle will be inhaled into physiological dead space, where it serves no useful purpose as it cannot diffuse into the blood. Oxygen delivered during stages of the breathing cycle in which it is not inhaled is also wasted, unless it is stored temporarily.

A continuous constant flow rate delivered to the mouth and nose uses a simple regulator, but is inefficient as a high percentage of the delivered gas does not reach the alveoli, and over half is not inhaled at all. A system which accumulates free-flow oxygen during resting and exhalation stages, (reservoir cannulas, partial rebreather masks and non-rebreather masks) makes a larger part of the oxygen available for inhalation, and it will be selectively inhaled during the initial part of inhalation, which reaches furthest into the lungs, and may also recover the volume inhaled into dead space for re-use on the next breath if it can be accommodated by the reservoir bag. The flow rate must be matched to the breathing interface storage volume and the user's breathing tidal volume and breathing rate for best efficiency, and the tidal volume and breathing rate can vary considerably over a short period with changes in exertion, so these methods are not very effective for an active user.

Delivery by demand valve avoids wastage of oxygen when the user is not actively inhaling, and when combined with a suitably calibrated dilution orifice can conserve a large proportion of the stored oxygen, but it still wastes oxygen to fill the anatomical and mechanical dead spaces, and it requires some physical effort by the user.

Since the 1980s, devices have been available which conserve stored oxygen by delivering it during the stage of the breathing cycle when it is more effectively used. This has the effect of stored oxygen lasting longer, or a smaller, and therefore lighter, portable oxygen delivery system being practicable. This class of device can also be used with portable oxygen concentrators, making them more efficient.

A pulse dose oxygen conserving device, (or demand pulse device) senses the start of inhalation and provides a metered bolus, which, if correctly matched to requirements, will be sufficient and effectively inhaled into the alveoli. Such systems can be pneumatically or electrically controlled.

Adaptive demand systems are a development in pulse demand delivery. They are devices that automatically adjust the volume of the pulsed bolus to suit the activity level of the user. This adaptive response is intended to reduce desaturation responses caused by exercise rate variation. The exhaled gas from these devices is discharged to the environment, and the oxygen is lost, so they are less gas-efficient than closed circuit rebreathers, but do not have a carbon dioxide scrubber or counterlungs, which is a saving on weight and bulk, and make use of the oxygen available in the ambient air, so their efficiency is better at lower altitudes.

==== High altitude supplemental oxygen ====
Mountaineering breathing apparatus provides oxygen at a higher concentration than available from atmospheric air in a naturally hypoxic environment. Breathing pure oxygen results in an elevated partial pressure of oxygen in the blood: a climber breathing pure oxygen at the summit of Mt. Everest has a greater arterial oxygen partial pressure than breathing air at sea level. This results in being able to exert greater physical effort at altitude. The equipment must be lightweight and reliable in severe cold, including not getting choked with deposited frost from the exhaled gas, which is saturated with water vapour at body temperature.

For mountaineering at high altitudes where the user has to carry the stored oxygen, it is desirable to maximise endurance of the set by efficient use of the gas. The theoretically available delivery systems are: a constant flow system without reservoir, which is simple and reliable, but extremely wasteful, a constant flow system with reservoir, which when matched to the user demand is more efficient than simple constant flow, and is also relatively simple and reliable, a demand valve system, which automatically follows user demand, but also wastes a significant part of inhaled gas on dead space, a pulse dose demand system, which wastes less gas on dead space, but relies on a relatively complex control system which introduces reliability issues, or a closed circuit system, which is very efficient, but requires a carbon dioxide scrubber. The exothermic carbon dioxide absorption reaction of a rebreather helps keep the scrubber contents from freezing while it is in use, and helps reduce heat loss from the user, but it is bulky and heavy, and is sensitive to freezing when not in constant use. Both chemically generated and compressed gas oxygen have been used in experimental closed-circuit oxygen mountaineering systems, but open circuit constant flow using a reservoir mask has usually been used in the field, although relatively wasteful, as the equipment is reliable.

Although there is considerable similarity in the basic conditions in which aviation and mountaineering breathing apparatus is used, there are differences sufficient to make directly transferable use of equipment generally impracticable. One of the major considerations is that, unlike the aviator, the mountaineer cannot quickly descend to a safe altitude if the equipment fails, so it must be reliable. Another is that the mountaineer must personally carry the breathing apparatus, so the advantage gained by breathing supplemental oxygen must exceed the disadvantage of carrying the extra bulk and weight of the equipment. Other requirements are that the added work of breathing must be low, the equipment must function at low temperatures, and conservation of heat and moisture are desirable. The altitude range for mountaineering is also limited, there are no requirements for pressurisation.

==== Oxygen therapy ====
Oxygen therapy is the use of supplemental oxygen as medical therapy. Acute indications for therapy include hypoxemia (low blood oxygen levels), carbon monoxide toxicity, cluster headache and decompression illness. It may also be prophylactically given to maintain blood oxygen levels during the induction of anesthesia. Oxygen therapy is often useful in chronic hypoxemia caused by conditions such as severe COPD or cystic fibrosis. Partial pressures administered range from low flow rates giving slight increases over ambient air up to 2.8 bar absolute used in hyperbaric oxygen treatment of decompression illness and some other indications. Oxygen can be delivered to spontaneously breathing patients via nasal cannula, face mask, artificial airway, or by built-in breathing system demand mask or oxygen hood in a hyperbaric chamber. Delivery may be by continuous flow, by bag reservoir mask, on demand, or on pulse demand.

Patients who are not able to breathe sufficiently for themselves are provided with breathing gas by ventilator or resuscitator.

=== Medical breathing apparatus ===
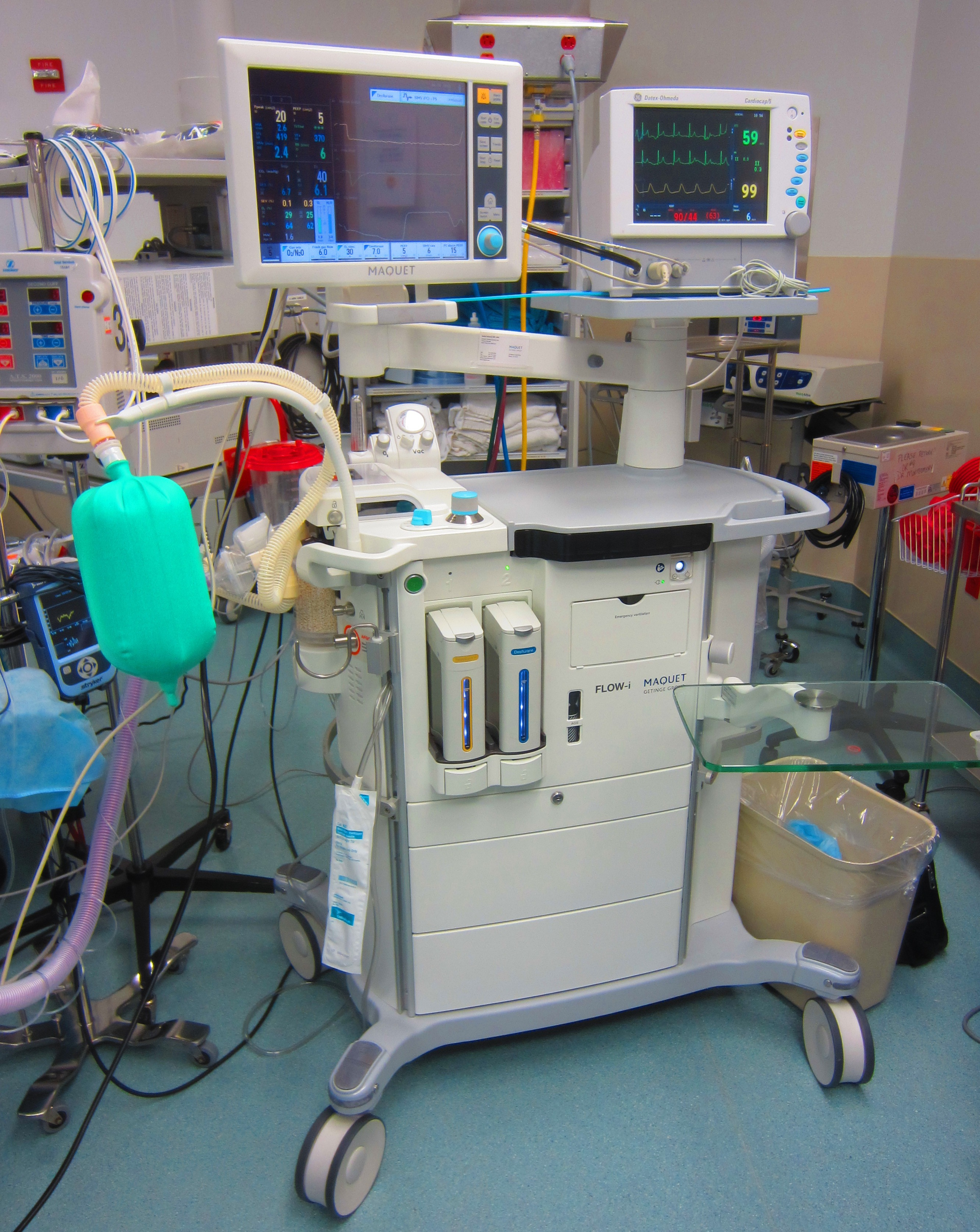
An anaesthetic machine

An anaesthetic machine (British English) or anesthesia machine (American English) is a medical device used to generate and mix a fresh gas flow of medical gases and inhalational anaesthetic agents for the purpose of inducing and maintaining anaesthesia.

==== Anaesthetic machines ====
The anaesthetic machine is commonly used together with a mechanical ventilator, breathing system, suction equipment, and patient monitoring devices; strictly speaking, the term "anaesthetic machine" refers only to the component which generates the gas flow, but modern machines usually integrate all these devices into one combined freestanding unit, which is colloquially referred to as the anaesthetic machine for the sake of simplicity. In the developed world, the most frequent type in use is the continuous-flow anaesthetic machine, which is designed to provide a supply of medical gases mixed with an accurate concentration of anaesthetic vapour, and to deliver this continuously to the patient at a safe pressure and flow. This is distinct from intermittent-flow anaesthetic machines, which provide gas flow only on demand when triggered by the patient's own inspiration.

==== Mechanical ventilators and resuscitators ====
Mechanical ventilation is the provision of breathing gas to the user by the ventilator or resuscitator, when the user is unable to provide the driving forces to induce gas flow. Such artificial ventilation is a characteristic of resuscitation and may be provided by medical ventilators when needed. Two basic types of mechanical ventilation may be distinguished by the limiting mechanism. Some are pressure controlled, in which the delivery stops when a limiting pressure is reached, and others are volume controlled, in which a set volume is delivered for each breath. Both of these methods have limitations and may work sub-optimally in some circumstances.

A ventilator is a type of equipment that provides mechanical ventilation by moving breathable air into and out of the lungs, to deliver breaths to a patient who is physically unable to breathe, or breathing insufficiently. Ventilators are computerized microprocessor-controlled machines, but patients can also be ventilated with a simple, hand-operated bag valve mask. Ventilators are chiefly used in intensive-care medicine, home care, and emergency medicine (as standalone units) and in anesthesiology (as a component of an anesthesia machine).

A resuscitator is a device using positive pressure to inflate the lungs of an unconscious person who is not breathing, in order to keep them oxygenated and alive.

There is considerable overlap between ventilator and resuscitator. The difference may mainly be in the way the equipment is used.

There are three modes of mechanical ventilation, which are the ways in which a breath is delivered by a medical ventilator: In control mode, each breath is mechanically delivered, but may be triggered by a timing mechanism or by patient effort. These breaths may be volume or pressure controlled. In supported or spontaneous mode, each breath is triggered by the patient, and supported by ventilator. In combination mode, there is a combination of controlled and supported breaths, and there may be a combination of volume controlled and pressure supported or controlled breaths.

=== High altitude breathing apparatus ===
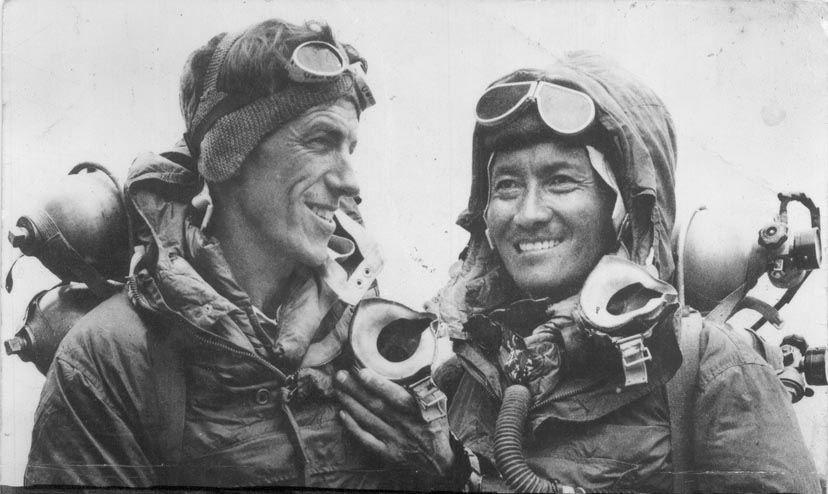
Edmund Hillary and Tenzing Norgay, 29 May 1953 after successfully completing the first ascent of Mount Everest using open circuit supplemental oxygen

High altitude breathing apparatus is used in aviation as standard equipment in unpressurised aircraft capable of high altitude flight, as emergency equipment in unpressurised aircraft, and in high altitude mountaineering.

==== Environmental influence ====
At high altitude, from 1,500 to 3,500 metres (4,900 to 11,500 ft) there are physiological effects of the reduced oxygen partial pressure which include reduced exercise performance and increased respiratory rate. Arterial oxygen saturation is generally still over 90% in healthy people, but arterial P_{O_{2}} is reduced.

At very high altitude, from 3,500 to 5,500 metres (11,500 to 18,000 ft) arterial oxygen saturation falls below 90% and arterial P_{O_{2}} is reduced to the extent that extreme hypoxemia may occur during exercise and sleep, and if high altitude pulmonary edema occurs. In this range severe altitude illness is common.

At extreme altitude, above 5,500 metres (18,000 ft), one can expect significant hypoxemia, hypocapnia and alkalosis, with progressive deterioration of physiological function, which exceeds acclimatisation. Consequently, there is no human habitation in this altitude range.

==== Physiological effects ====
In the region from sea level to around 3,000 m (10,000 ft), known as the physiological-efficient zone, oxygen levels are usually high enough for humans to function without supplemental oxygen and altitude decompression sickness is rare.

The physiological-deficient zone extends from 3,600 m (12,000 ft) to about 15,000 m (50,000 ft). In this zone there is an increased risk of hypoxia, trapped-gas dysbarism (where gas trapped in the body expands), and evolved-gas dysbarism (where dissolved gases such as nitrogen may form in the tissues, i.e. decompression sickness). Above approximately 4,300 m (14,000 ft) oxygen-rich breathing mixture is required to approximate the oxygen available in the lower atmosphere, while above 12,000 m (40,000 ft) oxygen must be provided under positive pressure. Above 15,000 m (49,000 ft), respiration is not possible because the pressure at which the lungs excrete carbon dioxide (approximately 87 mmHg) exceeds outside air pressure. Above 19,000 m (62,000 ft), known as the Armstrong limit, exposed fluids in the throat and lungs will boil away at normal body temperature, and pressure suits are needed. Generally, 100% oxygen is used to maintain an equivalent altitude of 3,000 m (10,000 ft).

==== Physiogical acclimatisation ====
People can become acclimatised to an altitude of 5,200 to 5,500 metres (17,000 to 18,000 ft) if they remain at high altitude for long enough, but for high altitude rescue work, rescue teams must be rapidly deployed, and the time necessary to acclimatise is not available, making oxygen breathing equipment necessary above approximately 3,700 metres (12,000 ft).

==== Theoretical solutions ====
An oxygen partial pressure equivalent to sea level can be maintained at an altitude of 10,000 metres (34,000 ft) with 100% oxygen. Above 12,000 metres (40,000 ft), positive pressure breathing with 100% oxygen is essential, as without positive pressure even very short exposures to altitudes above 13,000 metres (43,000 ft) lead to loss of consciousness. Oxygen conservation devices may be used with open circuit breathing apparatus to improve efficiency of gas use at lower altitudes where ambient pressure breathing is viable.

==== Management ====
At high enough altitudes the partial pressure of oxygen in the air is insufficient to support useful work and consciousness, even after acclimatisation, and at even higher altitudes it cannot support human life. At altitudes where the problem is hypoxia, breathing gas with a higher oxygen content at ambient pressure is a viable solution. Supplemental oxygen sufficient to provide an equivalent altitude of a pressurised aircraft cabin (about 8000ft) is sufficient for many purposes, but higher concentrations, such as sea level equivalent (P_{O_{2}} of about 0.21 bar), can allow a greater capacity for aerobic work. Balanced against this is the need to conserve oxygen and to minimise the weight carried by the user of breathing apparatus.

==== Practical aspects ====
Where the user must carry the supplementary oxygen supply, and also perform significant work over a fairly long period, as in mountaineering and rescue work, the efficiency of oxygen use and the reliability of the breathing apparatus are more important, and there is a trade-off of these characteristics with the weight that must be carried.

The amount of supplementary oxygen needed to bring the inhaled partial pressure to sea level equivalent, or any other fixed value greater than that of the ambient atmosphere is a function of the altitude, and increases with an increase in altitude in direct proportion to pressure drop. The amount of supplementary oxygen actually used is also proportional to respiratory minute volume, which depends on the level of exertion.

==== Oxygen concentrators ====
When there is no limitation on power use and the work is to be done at a fixed location, oxygen concentrators may be an effective solution. An oxygen concentrator is a device that concentrates the oxygen from a gas supply (typically ambient air) by selectively removing nitrogen to supply an oxygen-enriched product gas stream. They are also used industrially and as medical devices for oxygen therapy. Two methods in common use are pressure swing adsorption and membrane gas separation. They are most efficient when the supplemental oxygen does not need to be at a high percentage.

Pressure swing adsorption oxygen concentrators use a molecular sieve to adsorb gases and operate on the principle of rapid pressure swing adsorption of atmospheric nitrogen onto zeolite minerals at high pressure. This type of adsorption system is therefore functionally a nitrogen scrubber, leaving the other atmospheric gases to pass through, with oxygen as the primary gas remaining. Gas separation across a membrane is also a pressure-driven process, where the driving force is the difference in pressure between inlet of raw material and outlet of product. The membrane used in the process is a generally non-porous layer, so there will not be a severe leakage of gas through the membrane. The performance of the membrane depends on permeability and selectivity. Permeability is affected by the penetrant size. Larger gas molecules have a lower diffusion coefficient. The membrane gas separation equipment typically pumps gas into the membrane module and the targeted gases are separated based on difference in diffusivity and solubility. Product gas can be delivered directly to the user through a suitable breathing apparatus.

Pulse dose (also called intermittent-flow or on-demand) portable oxygen concentrators are the smallest units, which may weigh as little as 2.3 kilograms (5 lb) Their small size enables the user to waste less of the energy gained from the treatment on carrying them. The unit administers a set volume (bolus) of oxygen enriched air at the start of each breath, which is the part of the breath most likely to reach the gas exchange regions of the lung beyond the physiological dead space. Their ability to make efficient use of oxygen is key to keeping the units compact.

==== Closed circuit oxygen rebreathers ====
In a closed circuit system, any unused oxygen is retained and rebreathed, so the utilisation is close to 100%, with some losses possible due to expansion on increased altitude and incidental leakage from the breathing loop.

There is a risk of pulmonary oxygen toxicity if the pressure of the oxygen exceeds about 0.5 bar for extended periods, which could happen at altitudes below 5500 m, where atmospheric pressure is about half of the value at sea level.

A closed circuit oxygen rebreather is the most efficient in terms of oxygen use, but is relatively bulky and requires the use of a carbon dioxide absorbent, which must either be sufficient for the oxygen supply, or must be periodically replaced. If the oxygen supply fails, the loop gas can become more hypoxic than ambient atmosphere if the loop was not adequately purged or if it gets contaminated by ambient air. In the absence of oxygen monitoring the user may not notice the reduction in oxygen concentration.

A closed-circuit oxygen system was tested by Tom Bourdillon and Charles Evans during the 1953 British expedition to Mount Everest.

==== Open circuit dilutor demand regulator ====
The dilutor demand regulator was developed and extensively used for high altitude flying during WWII. A dilutor demand regulator draws ambient air into the mask through an orifice in the regulator, while concurrently being fed with pure oxygen through a demand valve in the regulator. For aeronautical use the size of the ambient air orifice is controlled by an aneroid valve operator and is directly proportional to atmospheric pressure. As the altitude increases, the pressure decreases and the orifice gets smaller, so the user is provided with a higher proportion of oxygen, and when correctly calibrated, the partial pressure of oxygen in the mixture remains fairly consistent at a value similar to the 0.21 bar at sea level. This system makes efficient use of a combination of ambient and stored oxygen. The function of the aneroid valve operator can be substituted for terrestrial use by a simpler, lighter, and more rugged manually operated orifice selector knob, giving a stepwise range of concentrations which is lighter, more reliable, a bit less efficient, and requires appropriate selection by the user. It also allows the user to manually adjust the mixture to match personal needs. As it is manually selected, It is less suitable for flying, and more suitable for pedestrians who will not change altitude rapidly. The flow rates through the orifice and regulator are sensitive to flow rate of inhalation, and can be designed to provide a somewhat higher oxygen partial pressure at higher inhalation flow rates, which helps compensate for higher exertion.

==== Obligatory pressurisation zone ====
This is the zone where 100% oxygen at ambient pressure is insufficient, and some form of pressurisation is required to provide a viable inhalation oxygen pressure. The options are partial pressurisation and full pressurisation.

A pressure suit is a protective suit worn by high-altitude pilots who may fly at altitudes where the air pressure is too low for an unprotected person to survive, even breathing pure oxygen at positive pressure. Such suits may be either full-pressure (e.g., a space suit) or partial-pressure (as used by aircrew). Partial-pressure suits work by providing mechanical counter-pressure to assist breathing at altitude.

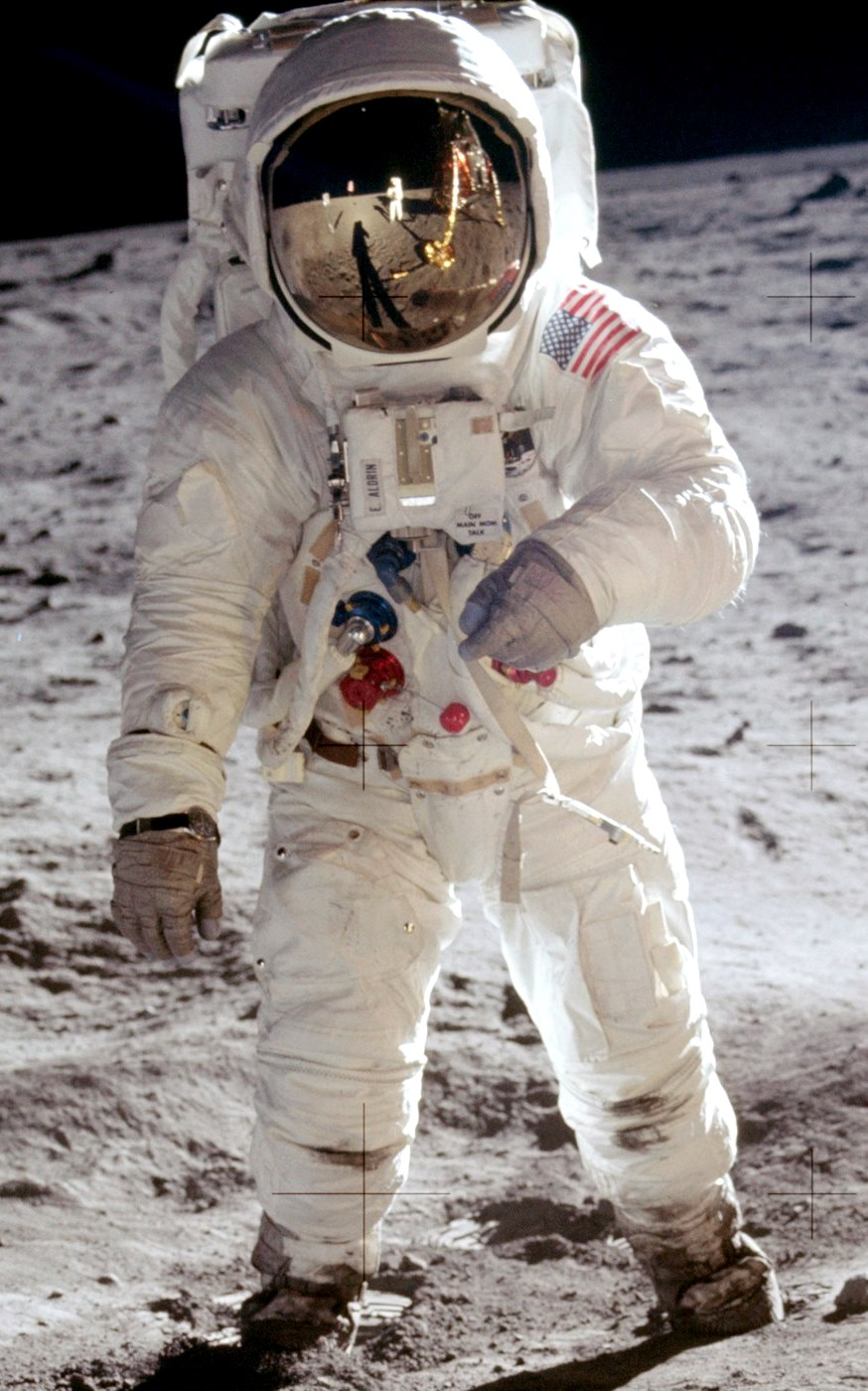
Apollo spacesuit worn by astronaut Buzz Aldrin on Apollo 11, with completely self-contained life support for lunar excursions.

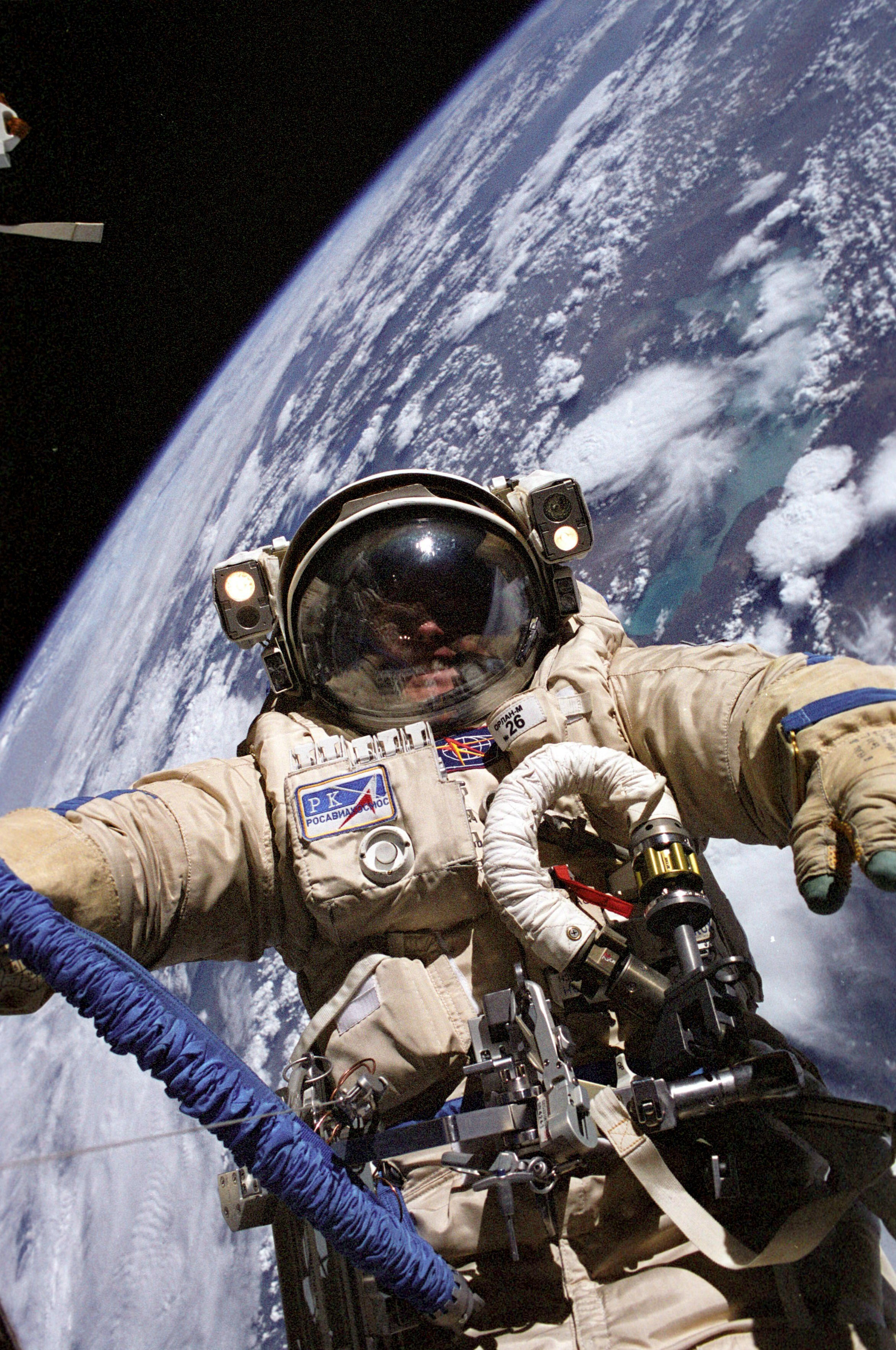
Orlan space suit worn by astronaut Michael Fincke outside the International Space Station, which has a remote supply via the umbilical.

A space suit is a garment worn to keep a human alive in the harsh environment of outer space, primarily as protection from vacuum and temperature extremes. The breathing gas is pure oxygen, which allows the lowest suit pressure. Space suits are often worn inside spacecraft as a safety precaution in case of loss of cabin pressure, and are essential for extravehicular activity (EVA). Modern space suits augment the basic pressure garment with a complex system of equipment and environmental systems designed to keep the wearer comfortable, and to minimize the effort required to bend the limbs, resisting a soft pressure garment's natural tendency to stiffen against the vacuum. A self-contained oxygen supply and environmental control system may be used to allow greater freedom of movement, independent of the spacecraft.

Three types of space suits exist for different purposes: IVA (intravehicular activity), EVA (extravehicular activity), and IEVA (intra/extravehicular activity). IVA suits are meant to be worn inside a pressurized spacecraft, and are therefore lighter and more comfortable. IEVA suits are meant for use inside and outside the spacecraft, such as the Gemini G4C suit. They include more protection from the harsh conditions of space, such as protection from micrometeoroids and extreme temperature change. EVA suits, such as the EMU, are used outside spacecraft, for either planetary exploration or spacewalks. They must protect the wearer against all conditions of space, as well as provide mobility and functionality.

== Safety ==
Breathing apparatus is usually used as personal protective equipment, and the user should be safer using it than without it in the same environment if it is needed, but there are hazards associated with its use. Some are specific to the apparatus and others are more general. The more obvious generic hazards are loss of gas supply, contamination of gas supply, and inappropriate gas supply. The consequences may include hypoxia, hyperoxia, hypercapnia, and poisoning or infection by contamination of the breathing gas due to leaks. Where high oxygen concentrations are provided, there may be a fire hazard, where high pressure gas storage is used, there are hazards associated with the high pressure equipment, and where liquid oxygen is used there are hazards of extreme cold.

The usual methods of risk management include design standards, quality control during manufacture, testing and certification of equipment, appropriate training of operators, regulation of use, as appropriate to the specific equipment and situations in which it is used, and correct selection of equipment for the situation. For some equipment, proper maintenance and pre-use inspection and testing are required.

== Physiological effects of use ==
Breathing apparatus of several types may affect the physical work capacity of the wearer if they cause additional breathing resistance or dead space ad by the weight that must be carried. The effects are changes to breathing patterns, hypoventilation, and the associated carbon dioxide retention due to increases in the work of breathing. These effects are more apparent during heavy physical work, and maximum work capacity is reduced.

== Human factors in breathing apparatus design ==
Human factors in breathing apparatus design are the influence of the interaction between the user and the equipment on the design of the equipment. The user of breathing apparatus relies on the equipment to stay alive or healthy, in reasonable comfort and to perform the tasks required during use of the equipment. The design of the equipment can strongly influence its effectiveness in performing the desired functions. It should be comfortable to wear, and not cause stress injury or allergic reactions to component materials. It must be reliable and should not require constant attention or adjustment during use, and if possible performance should degrade gradually in the event of malfunctions, allowing time for corrective action to be taken with minimum risk. It should not excessively burden the user by its weight or reduce work capacity unnecessarily by dead space, increased work of breathing or obstruction of vision.

Users vary considerably in anthropometric dimensions, physical strength, stamina, joint flexibility, etc. Breathing apparatus should allow as full a range of physical function as reasonably practicable and should be matched to the user, the environment and the task. The interface between equipment and user can strongly influence functionality. Breathing apparatus may be used by a wide range of users and must work for them all. Where correct operation and use of equipment is critical to user safety, it is desirable that different makes and models for the same application should work similarly, to facilitate rapid familiarisation with new equipment. Where this is not possible, additional training for the required skills may be necessary, and for medical interventions it may be necessary for a skilled operator to set up the apparatus and monitor its function while in use.

The user of breathing apparatus may be supported by a team who are available to assist to the extent necessary to reduce the risk associated with the use of the apparatus to a level acceptable in terms of the governing regulations and codes of practice.

Breathing apparatus is used to facilitate breathing in hazardous conditions or where the user needs assistance to respire adequately. The primary requirements are to keep the user alive and healthy during and after use. Secondary requirements include providing user comfort, and sufficient capacity to perform the intended activities. The user is an integral part of the system, which may rely on user competence as well as correct equipment function for safe operation.

Fault tolerance is the property that enables a system to continue operating properly in the event of the failure of some of its components. If its operating quality decreases at all, the decrease is proportional to the severity of the failure, as compared to a naively designed system, in which even a small failure can cause total breakdown. Fault tolerance is particularly important in high availability or safety-critical systems. The ability to maintain functionality when portions of a system break down is referred to as 'graceful degradation'. Some items of breathing apparatus, and the user, may be regarded as safety critical components of the system, and should therefore be tolerant of faults. In the case of the user, this is achieved by sufficient fitness to perform the intended task, competence, and situational awareness. Equipment must be selected which is appropriate for the specific use, and can be designed, manufactured, and maintained to provide appropriate fault tolerance. Good ergonomic design minimises the opportunity for user error.

=== Work of breathing ===
Graph of the breathing resistance of an open-circuit demand regulator. The area of the graph (green) is proportional to the net mechanical work of breathing for a single breathing cycle

Breathing apparatus must allow the user to breathe with minimum added work of breathing, and minimise additional dead space.

Work of breathing (WOB) is the energy expended to inhale and exhale a breathing gas. It is usually expressed as work per unit volume, for example, joules per litre, or as a work rate (power), such as joules per min or equivalent units, as it is not particularly useful without a reference to volume or time. It can be calculated in terms of the pulmonary pressure multiplied by the change in pulmonary volume, or in terms of the oxygen consumption attributable to breathing.

The total work of breathing when using a breathing apparatus is the sum of the physiological work of breathing and the mechanical work of breathing of the apparatus. In a normal resting state the physiological work of breathing constitutes about 5% of the total body oxygen consumption. It can increase considerably due to illness or constraints on gas flow imposed by breathing apparatus, ambient pressure, or breathing gas composition.

=== Breathing mask construction ===
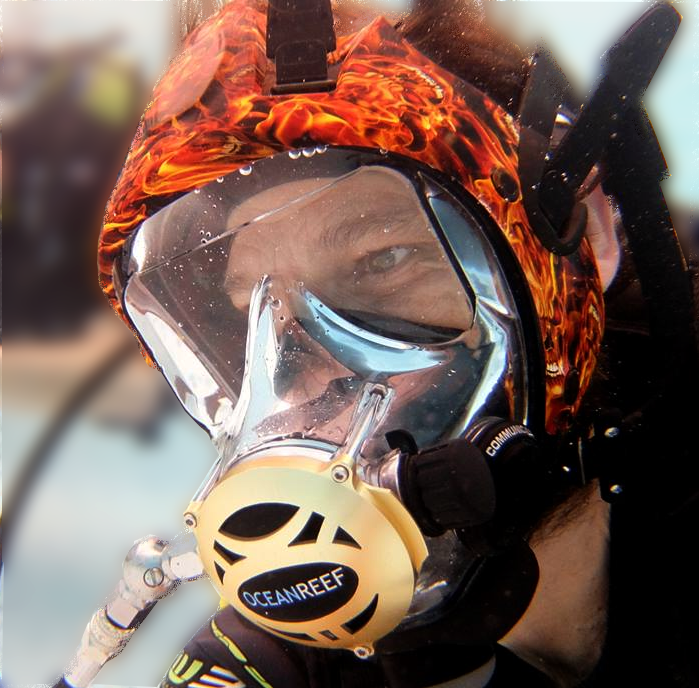
Ocean Reef Full Face Mask (IDM)

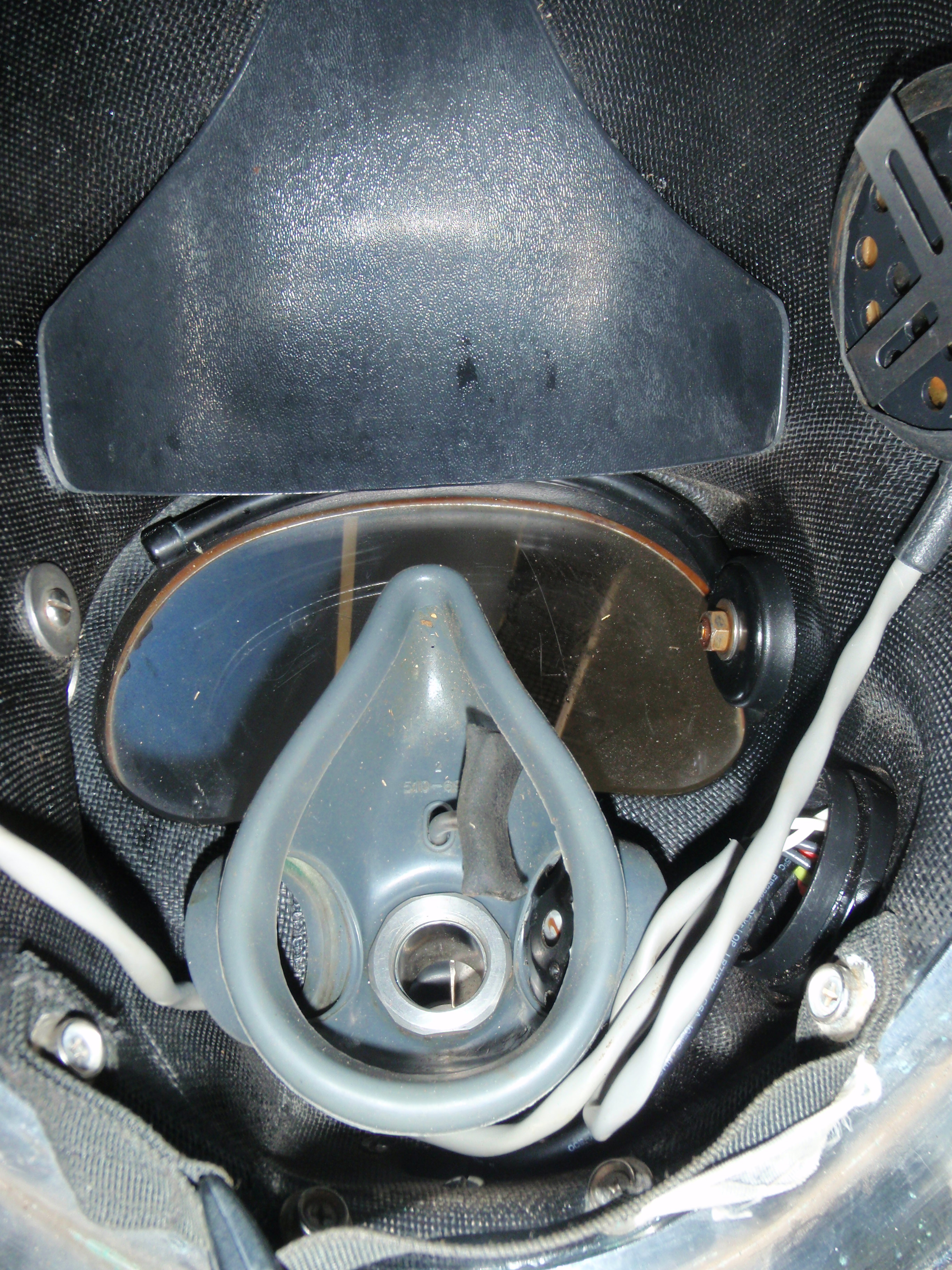
Inside view of a Kirby Morgan 37 showing the oral-nasal mask used to minimise dead space, the microphone and a loudspeaker of the communications system

Breathing masks and diving helmets both provide a supply of breathing gas to the user. Other functions may differ or partly overlap.

==== Seal ====
If the mask is intended to be used in a hostile environment and contamination of the gas supply must be prevented, the mask must form an airtight or watertight seal around the edges, regardless of the position of the user. This seal is between the elastomer skirt of the mask and the skin of the face. Fit of mask affects the seal and comfort and must account for variability of face shapes and sizes. This is less of a problem with full-face masks and less again with diving helmets, but other problems affect these, like overall head size, and neck length and circumference, so there is still a need for adjustment and a few size options.

Seals may be compromised by hair passing under the seal, and the amount of leakage will depend on the amount of hair and in some cases, the position of the compromised part of the seal.

==== Ear clearing ====
The gas space in a breathing mask is inherently self-equalising for reasonably gradual pressure changes. If the mask is to be used where the ambient pressure may change significantly, the user must be able to equalise the pressure in the middle ears, which for many people requires a method to block the nostrils.

Diving helmets and most full-face masks do not allow the user finger access to the nose, and various mechanical aids have been tried with varying levels of comfort and convenience. Masks for supplemental oxygen may be soft enough to close the nose with the mask in place, or may be temporarily removed. Masks for use in contaminated atmospheres are usually used at a constant ambient pressure, so this problem may not arise.

==== Vision ====
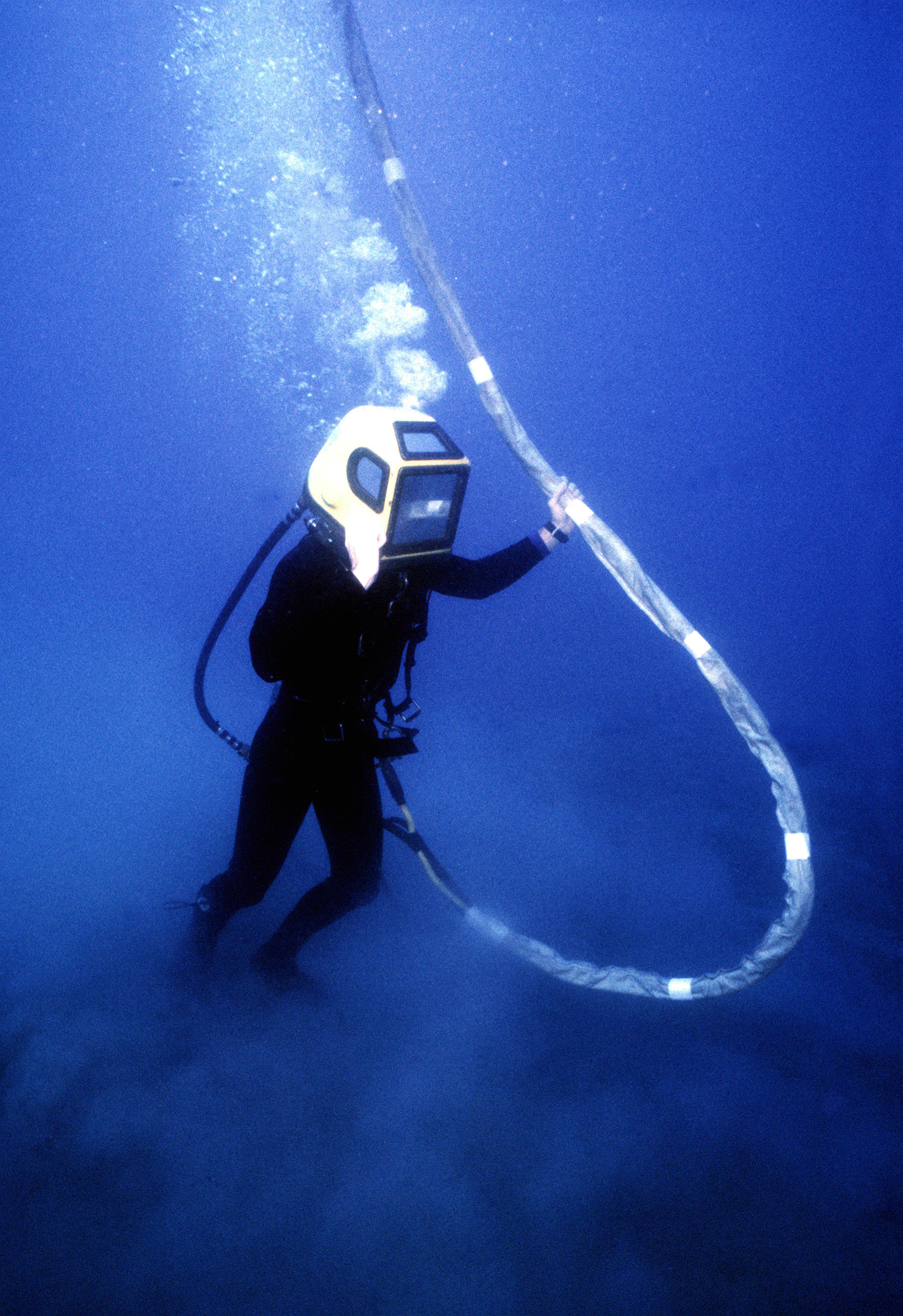
A diver using the US Navy Mark 12 freeflow helmet, which has unusually large viewports

The field of vision of the user of a full-face breathing mask or helmet is reduced by opaque parts of the helmet or mask. Peripheral vision can be particularly reduced in the lower areas due to the bulk of the demand valve. Helmet design is a compromise between low mass and inertia, with relatively small interior volume and viewports affording restricted field of vision, and large viewports with large interior volume. Siting the viewport close to the eyes helps provide a better view but is complicated by the need for sufficient clearance in front of the nose for a wide range of divers. Cylindrically curved viewports can introduce visual distortions underwater that can reduce the effectiveness of the diver at judging distance, but are common in masks used in air. Spherical viewport surfaces are generally used in recent atmospheric suits for structural reasons, and work well when the interior volume is large enough. They can be made wide enough for adequate peripheral vision. Field of vision in helmets is affected by mobility of the helmet. A helmet directly supported by the head can rotate with the head, allowing the user to aim the viewport at the target, but peripheral vision is constrained by the dimensions of the viewport. The weight in air and unbalanced buoyancy forces when immersed must be carried by the neck, and inertial and hydrodynamic loads must be carried by the neck. A helmet fixed to a breastplate or space suit is supported by the torso, which can safely support much greater loads, but it does not rotate with the head. The entire upper body must rotate to direct the field of vision. This makes it necessary to use larger viewports so the user has an acceptable field of vision at times when rotating the body is impractical. The need to rotate the head inside the non-rotatable helmet requires internal clearance, therefore a large volume.

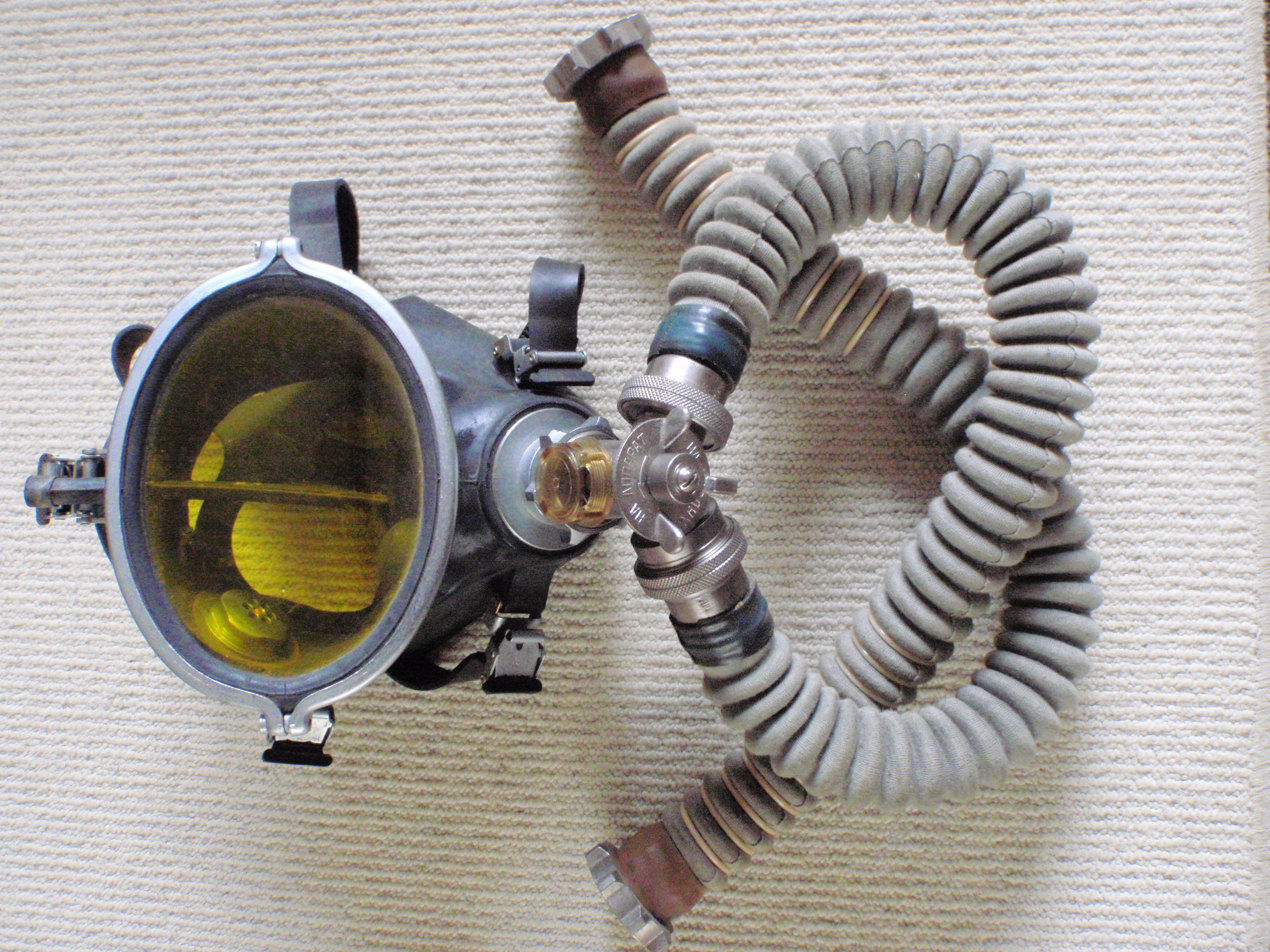
IDA-71 mask, showing the central wiper blade which is operated using the handle projecting from the top of the mask

The inside surface of the viewport of a mask or helmet tends to be prone to fogging when the external environment is colder than the dew point of the gas inside, where tiny droplets of condensed water disperse light passing through the transparent material, blurring the view. Treating the inside surface with a defogging surfactant can reduce fogging, but it may occur anyway, and it must be possible to actively defog, either by rinsing with water or by blowing dry air over it until it is clear. A spitcock may be provided on standard helmets for rinsing. Demand helmets may have a free-flow supply valve which directs dry air over the inside of the facepiece. Full-face diving masks may use either rinsing or free-flow, depending on whether they are intended primarily for scuba or surface-supply. Full-face masks and helmets may also direct the flow of fresh dry gas over the inside surface of the viewport before it is inhaled, and prevent warm, moist exhaled gas from reaching the faceplate by using an oro-nasal insert with a non-return valve in the exhaust flow path. In situations where rinsing is not an option, an anti-fogging surfactant can be applied to the viewport surface to prevent the formation of droplets. A manually operated wiper blade has also occasionally been used for removing condensation from the viewport.

Users who need optical correction have choices. Contact lenses can be worn under all types of masks and helmets. Regular spectacles can be worn in most helmets, but can not be adjusted. Corrective lenses can be fitted to the inside of some full-face masks, but the distance from the eyes to the lenses may not be optimal. Bifocal arrangements are available. Defogging of bonded lenses is the same as for plain glass.

Open circuit breathing apparatus for diving produces exhalation gas bubbles at the exhaust ports. Free-flow systems produce the largest volumes, but the outlet can be behind the viewports so it does not obscure the diver's vision. Demand systems must have the second stage diaphragm and exhaust ports at approximately the same depth as the mouth or lungs to minimise work of breathing. To get consistent breathing effort for the range of postures the diver may need to assume, this is most practicable when the exhaust ports and valves are close to the mouth, so some form of ducting is required to direct the bubbles away from the viewports of helmet or mask. This generally diverts exhaust gases round the sides of the head, where they tend to be rather noisy as the bubbles rise past the ears. Closed circuit systems vent far less gas, which can be released behind the diver, and are significantly quieter. Diffuser systems have been tried, but have not been successful for open circuit equipment, though they have been used on rebreathers, where they improve stealth characteristics.

==== Security ====
Masks held in place by adjustable straps can be knocked off or moved from the correct position, allowing ambient atmosphere or water to flood in, and the loss of breathing gas. Full-face breathing masks are more easily dislodged due to their size, and need to be more securely supported, usually by 4 or 5 adjustable straps, connected at the back of the head, but it is possible for them to be dislodged, so it must be possible for the user to refit them and purge the mask sufficiently to continue breathing. Helmets are much more securely attached, and it is considered an emergency if they come off the head.

==== Internal volume ====
The volume of dead space is important for all breathing apparatus. Internal oro-nasal masks are often used to minimise internal dead space in helmets and full-face masks, and may also reduce the tendency to fog the inner surface of the viewport.

==== Helmet buoyancy ====
A lightweight demand diving helmet is ballasted to be nearly neutrally buoyant underwater so it is not an excessive static load on the neck.

Free-flow diving helmets compensate for a potentially large dead space by a high gas flow rate, so that exhaled gas is flushed away before it can be rebreathed. They tend to have a large internal volume, and be heavier than demand helmets, and usually rest on the shoulders to prevent over-stressing the neck, so do not move with the head. Underwater, excess buoyancy is counteracted by connection to the diver's weighting system or by jocking straps.

==== SCBA harness ====
When the user must carry the gas supply, weight, balance and inertia of the apparatus and the load distribution of the harness can make a large difference to comfort and safety, particularly when the user may be required to do heavy work in difficult conditions, as in firefighting, rescue and mountain climbing. The user must have as much freedom of movement as is reasonably practicable, and at least enough to safely carry out the expected tasks' while the set must remain securely in place during the necessary maneuvers. Access to the valves and pressure gauge is important for gas management, and it is helpful when equipment is shared by a team that the fit can be easily and quickly adjusted to suit the individual. For diving the buoyancy and buoyancy distribution are important to safety.

=== Gas management ===
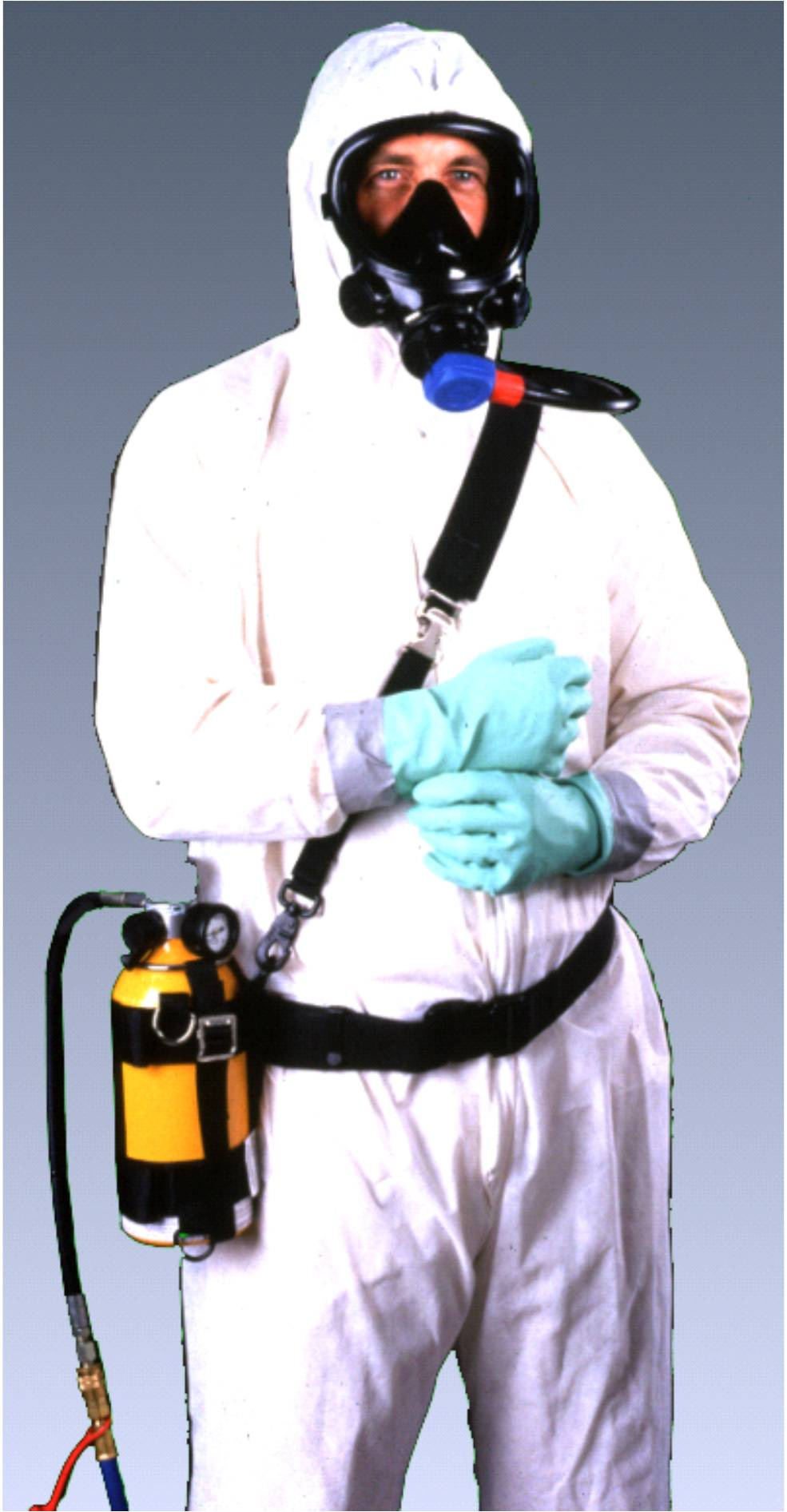
Airline supplied respirator with emergency gas supply cylinder.

For supplied gas breathing apparatus, it is usually highly undesirable, and may well be an emergency, to run out of gas unexpectedly. Monitoring remaining gas, identifying low gas levels in time to take appropriate action, and where necessary, bailing out to an available backup system are necessary items of gas management.

==== Gas endurance ====
The most fundamental aspect of gas management is to have a realistic idea of the expected endurance of the currently available gas, and how this will be affected by exertion in foreseeable circumstances. Periodical checks on the remaining gas pressure is the usual monitoring method, for which the usual equipment is a cylinder pressure gauge attached to the regulator first stage. When the user is likely to be task loaded to the extent that failing to check gas pressure is reasonably likely, a low gas alarm, a manual reserve switchover, or both are prudent. All three of these may be found on industrial breathing sets used for rescue and firefighting. For underwater diving, pressure gauges are standard, with an alternative gas supply system selected from a contextually acceptable option of scuba bailout set, gas supplied by a buddy diver, or emergency ascent to the surface. The choice depends on the risk assessment, and in some cases standard operating procedures or code of practice. Reserve valves are also occasionally still used in low visibility conditions. The buddy system and emergency ascents are frequently used by recreational divers in shallow open water with no planned decompression obligation. Occupational divers may be obliged to carry an independent bailout set, and technical divers may have several contingency plans for the reasonably foreseeable situations that could occur that would compromise their breathing gas supply.

When more than one breathing gas mixture is available, the risk of selecting a gas unsuitable for the current situation must be minimised.

In medical equipment, the user interface of the control and monitoring system can influence the probability of operator error.

=== Rebreather endurance ===
The endurance of a rebreather or life support system providing gas to a breathing apparatus is also dependent on its ability to remove carbon dioxide from the exhaled gas. This is known as scrubber endurance.

== See also ==
- Glossary of breathing apparatus terminology
- Emergency Air Breather – Built-in breathing system in US submarines
- Gas mask – Protection from inhaling airborne pollutants and toxic gases
- Iron lung – Negative-pressure mechanical respirator
- Life support in aviation – Field centered on ensuring the safety of aircrew
- Life-support system – Technology that allows survival in hostile environments
- Respirator – Device worn to protect the user from inhaling contaminants
- Resuscitator – Medical device using positive pressure to inflate the lungs
- Ventilator – Device that provides mechanical ventilation to the lungs
