= Life support in aviation =

Field centered on ensuring the safety of aircrew

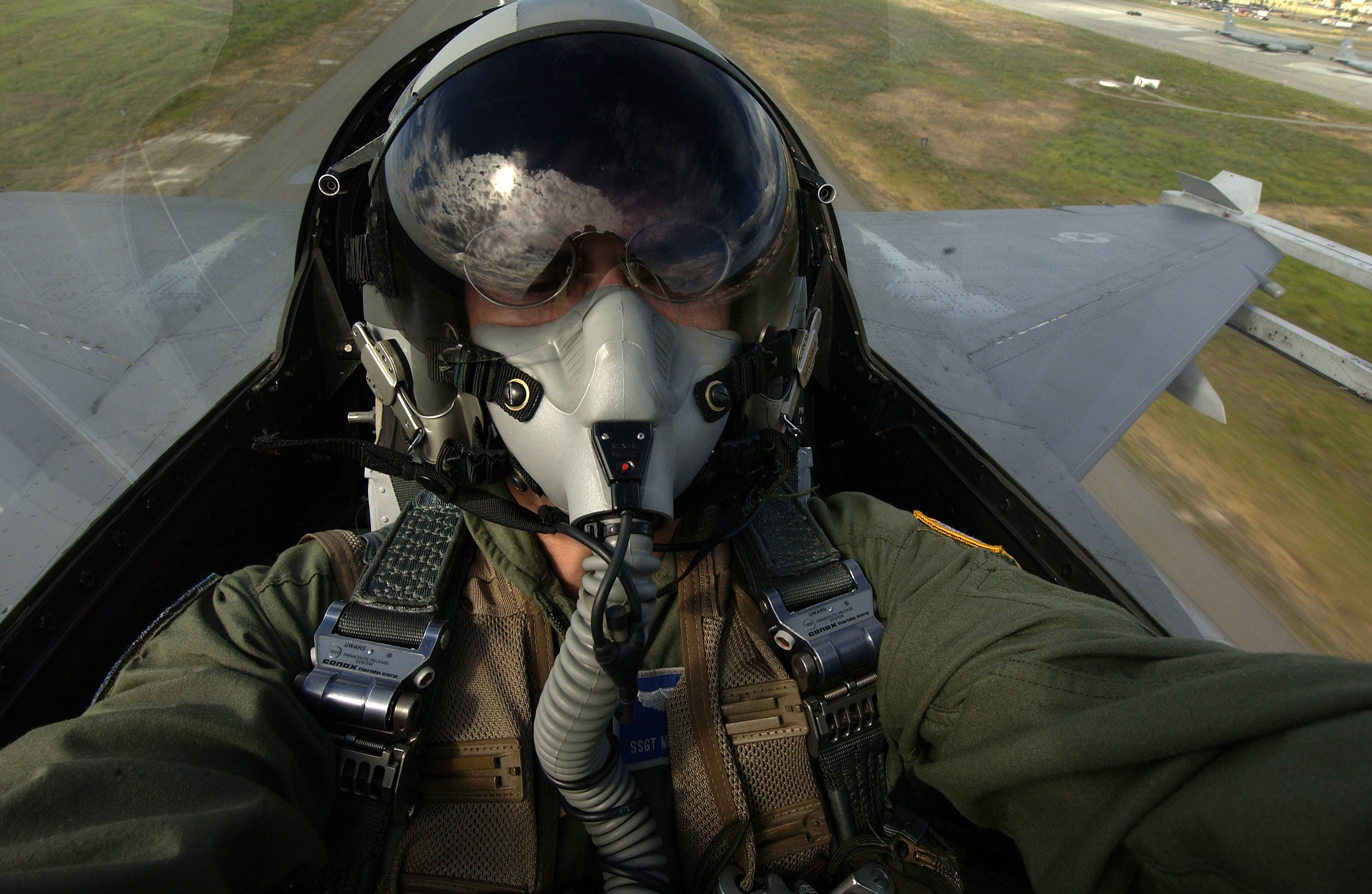
The breathing mask provides supplemental oxygen for high altitude flight for this fighter pilot

Life support, or aircrew life support, in aviation, is the field centered on, and related technologies used in, ensuring the safety of aircrew, particularly military aviation.

This includes safety equipment capable of helping them survive in the case of a crash, accident, or malfunction.

Life support functions and technology are also prominent in the field of human spaceflight.

An example of a life support system for aircraft, is systems that provide supplementary oxygen.

In the 2020s, NASA has helped developed advanced life support systems for aircraft. That same decade India also worked on life support systems for the Tejas fighter aircraft, with an integrated life support system for the aircraft tested 2025.

The U.S. Navy uses the CRU-103 regulator and MBU 23/P mask.

== See also ==
- Breathing apparatus
- Cabin pressurization
