= EAB (company) =

American education consulting firm

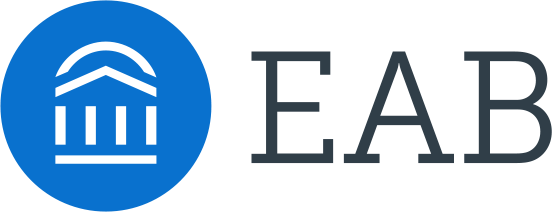
- Type: Private
- Industry: Education research, Education technology, Enrollment management, marketing
- Founded: 1979; 47 years ago
- Headquarters: Washington, DC, United States
- Area served: Worldwide
- Key people: David Felsenthal (CEO)
- Products: Navigate360, Enroll360, Adult Learner Recruitment, Strategic Advisory Services (Research), Edify, Advancement Marketing Services, and Virtual Tours
- Number of employees: 2,000
- Website: eab.com

EAB Global, Inc. is an education company headquartered in Washington, DC, with additional U.S. offices in Richmond, Virginia; Minneapolis, Minnesota; and Philadelphia, Pennsylvania, as well as international offices in the United Kingdom, Australia, Malaysia, and Nepal. The company traces its origins to The Advisory Board Company, a research and advisory organization founded in 1979, and became an independent entity in 2017. EAB provides research, technology, and services to educational institutions in areas including enrollment, recruitment, student success, advancement marketing, data and analytics, and institutional strategy. EAB serves over 2,800 institutions worldwide, including K-12 schools, colleges, universities, and Fortune 500 companies. EAB routinely produces research reports on trends in higher education, including analyses of financial and demographic pressures affecting colleges and universities.

== History ==
EAB, formerly the Education Advisory Board, originated as the education-focused division of The Advisory Board Company. The Advisory Board Company was founded in 1979 and initially developed research and advisory services for healthcare organizations before expanding into the education sector. The Advisory Board Company developed a model combining research, services, and software for institutions to implement operational improvements, which later became the structure of EAB's education-focused offerings. EAB was established as an education division of The Advisory Board Company in 2007. In January 2015, the company acquired Royall & Company, a Virginia-based firm focused on enrollment management and student recruitment services. Royall & Company, founded in 1983, had its services integrated into EAB's education offerings, eventually evolving into the company's Enroll360 and Adult Learner Recruitment offerings.

In 2015, EAB acquired GradesFirst, a student success technology company based in Birmingham, Alabama. The acquisition contributed to the development of EAB's student success technology, Navigate360. Navigate360 is an enrollment, retention, and advancement CRM platform used by higher education institutions, with AI features designed to support student communications and administrative workflows. Institutions use the system to track indicators such as course participation, academic performance, and financial activity in order to support student enrollment, retention, and advancement.

On November 17, 2017, EAB announced that it would become an independent company, separate from The Advisory Board Company, and would be acquired by Vista Equity Partners.

In 2019, EAB acquired YouVisit, a platform providing virtual campus tours and interactive web content used by colleges and universities to recruit prospective students. EAB has repeatedly been recognized by USA Today as one of the top places to work, starting in 2020.

In 2021, EAB expanded its portfolio through acquisitions in both student success technology and corporate services. In February 2021, the company announced the acquisition of Starfish, a platform used by higher education institutions to support student success initiatives, from Hobsons. In May 2021, BC Partners bought half of the company from Vista Equity Partners, becoming joint owners in the firm. Later that year, EAB acquired Seramount, from Bonnier Corp, adding a corporate-focused advisory brand offering workplace research and talent-related services. The firm’s Seramount brand serves over 650 corporations and Fortune 500 companies with talent services. The brand offers corporate clients best practice employee research, workplace assessment, employee learning and development, and talent sourcing. Also in 2021, EAB acquired Rapid Insight, a developer of data and analytics software for higher education administrators, to add to its Edify data management platform.

In 2023, EAB launched Appily, providing students with tools for exploring colleges and academic programs, including both searchable college profiles with admissions-related information and support, and a scholarship feature. The platform was developed following the company's earlier acquisition of Cappex. Also in 2023, EAB was first named to the GSV EdTech150 and has appeared on the list for several subsequent years.

In 2024, EAB acquired Forage, a company providing virtual job simulations designed to help students explore career paths and develop professional skills, expanding its offerings in tools that connect student success platforms with career preparation resources.

In 2026, EAB acquired Hybrid, a UK-based digital marketing company focused on higher education, to expand its marketing capabilities, including brand, paid media, and AI-driven tools, as well as to expand its reach outside the U.S.
