= Emergency Air Breather =

Built-in breathing system in US submarines

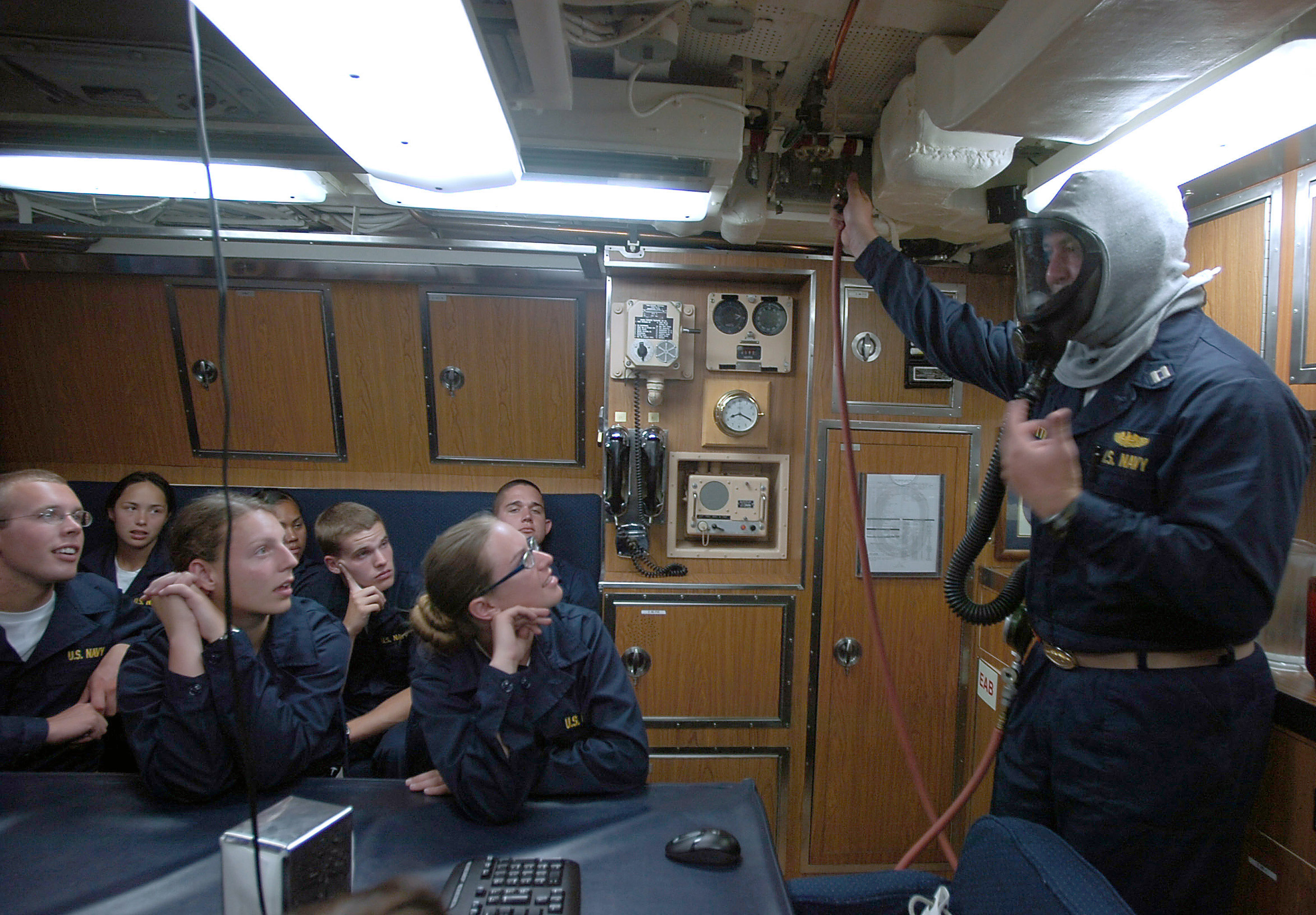
An EAB usage demonstration on board the USS Helena (SSN-725)

An Emergency Air Breather (EAB) is a device used on board U.S submarines in emergencies when the internal atmosphere is, or potentially is, unsuitable for breathing. It consists of a mask and air hose. The air hose ends with a fitting that allows quick insertion or removal from air manifolds equipped with quick-disconnect fittings. These air manifolds are located throughout the submarine.

While connected to a manifold, the wearer of the EAB can breathe and can move about within a few feet of the manifold. To move any further, the wearer must disconnect from the manifold, at which time the wearer cannot breathe, locate another manifold and connect to it.

Since the submarine may not be able to ventilate its atmosphere with fresh air for a long time, during which the submarine personnel must continue operating the submarine, all personnel undergo training to ensure they know locations of EAB manifolds and can find them even if there is no lighting. One training exercise, known as "EAB races", has personnel assemble at one end of the submarine where they don EABs and are blindfolded. They must then make their way to the other end of the submarine without removing their EAB masks or their blindfolds. Other training exercises require the personnel to don EABs while operating the submarine and its nuclear reactor, and continue the operations without removing their EABs.
